= Communauté de communes du Canton d'Hucqueliers et environs =

Coordinates: 50.5685°N 1.9051°E

Canton d'Hucqueliers et environs
- Former communauté de communes
- Interactive map of Canton d'Hucqueliers et environs
- Country: France
- Region: Hauts-de-France
- Department: Pas-de-Calais
- No. of communes: {{{nbcomm}}}
- Established: 1997
- Disbanded: 2017
- Population (1999): 6,546

The Communauté de communes du Canton d'Hucqueliers et environs was located in the Pas-de-Calais département, in northern France. It was created in January 1997. It was merged into the new Communauté de communes du Haut Pays du Montreuillois in January 2017.

== Composition ==
It comprised the following 24 communes:

1. Aix-en-Ergny
2. Alette
3. Avesnes
4. Bécourt
5. Beussent
6. Bezinghem
7. Bimont
8. Bourthes
9. Campagne-lès-Boulonnais
10. Clenleu
11. Enquin-sur-Baillons
12. Ergny
13. Herly
14. Hucqueliers
15. Humbert
16. Maninghem
17. Parenty
18. Preures
19. Quilen
20. Rumilly
21. Saint-Michel-sous-Bois
22. Verchocq
23. Wicquinghem
24. Zoteux
