= Communauté de communes du Canton de Fruges et environs =

Coordinates: 50.5146°N 2.1334°E

Canton de Fruges et environs
- Former communauté de communes
- Interactive map of Canton de Fruges et environs
- Country: France
- Region: Hauts-de-France
- Department: Pas-de-Calais
- No. of communes: {{{nbcomm}}}
- Established: 1995
- Disbanded: 2017
- Area: 191 km^{2} (74 sq mi)
- Population (1999): 7,050
  - Density: 36.9/km^{2} (95.6/sq mi)

The Communauté de communes du Canton de Fruges et environs was located in the Pas-de-Calais département, in northern France. It was created in January 1995. It was merged into the new Communauté de communes du Haut Pays du Montreuillois in January 2017.

== Composition ==
It comprised the following 25 communes:

1. Ambricourt
2. Avondance
3. Canlers
4. Coupelle-Neuve
5. Coupelle-Vieille
6. Crépy
7. Créquy
8. Embry
9. Fressin
10. Fruges
11. Hézecques
12. Lebiez
13. Lugy
14. Matringhem
15. Mencas
16. Planques
17. Radinghem
18. Rimboval
19. Royon
20. Ruisseauville
21. Sains-lès-Fressin
22. Senlis
23. Torcy
24. Verchin
25. Vincly
