= Herly =

Herly is the name of two communes in France:

- Herly, Pas-de-Calais
- Herly, Somme

Herly is also the nickname for Olympic rowing coxswain Doug Herland.
