= Communauté de communes du Haut Pays du Montreuillois =

Federation of municipalities in France

Haut Pays du Montreuillois
- Communauté de communes
- Interactive map of Haut Pays du Montreuillois
- Coordinates: 50°31′N 02°08′E
- Country: France
- Region: Hauts-de-France
- Department: Pas-de-Calais
- No. of communes: {{{nbcomm}}}
- Established: 2017
- Area: 420.8 km^{2} (162.5 sq mi)
- Population (2018): 15,747
  - Density: 37.42/km^{2} (96.92/sq mi)

In dark red, Haut Pays du Montreuillois.

The Communauté de communes du Haut Pays du Montreuillois is a communauté de communes, an intercommunal structure, in the Pas-de-Calais department, in the Hauts-de-France region, northern France. It was created in January 2017 by the merger of the former communautés de communes Canton de Fruges et environs and Canton d'Hucqueliers et environs. Its area is 420.8 km^{2}, and its population was 15,747 in 2018. Its seat is in Fruges.

== Composition ==
The communauté de communes consists of the following 49 communes:

1. Aix-en-Ergny
2. Alette
3. Ambricourt
4. Avesnes
5. Avondance
6. Bécourt
7. Beussent
8. Bezinghem
9. Bimont
10. Bourthes
11. Campagne-lès-Boulonnais
12. Canlers
13. Clenleu
14. Coupelle-Neuve
15. Coupelle-Vieille
16. Crépy
17. Créquy
18. Embry
19. Enquin-sur-Baillons
20. Ergny
21. Fressin
22. Fruges
23. Herly
24. Hézecques
25. Hucqueliers
26. Humbert
27. Lebiez
28. Lugy
29. Maninghem
30. Matringhem
31. Mencas
32. Parenty
33. Planques
34. Preures
35. Quilen
36. Radinghem
37. Rimboval
38. Royon
39. Ruisseauville
40. Rumilly
41. Sains-lès-Fressin
42. Saint-Michel-sous-Bois
43. Senlis
44. Torcy
45. Verchin
46. Verchocq
47. Vincly
48. Wicquinghem
49. Zoteux
