= Wicquinghem =

- Commune
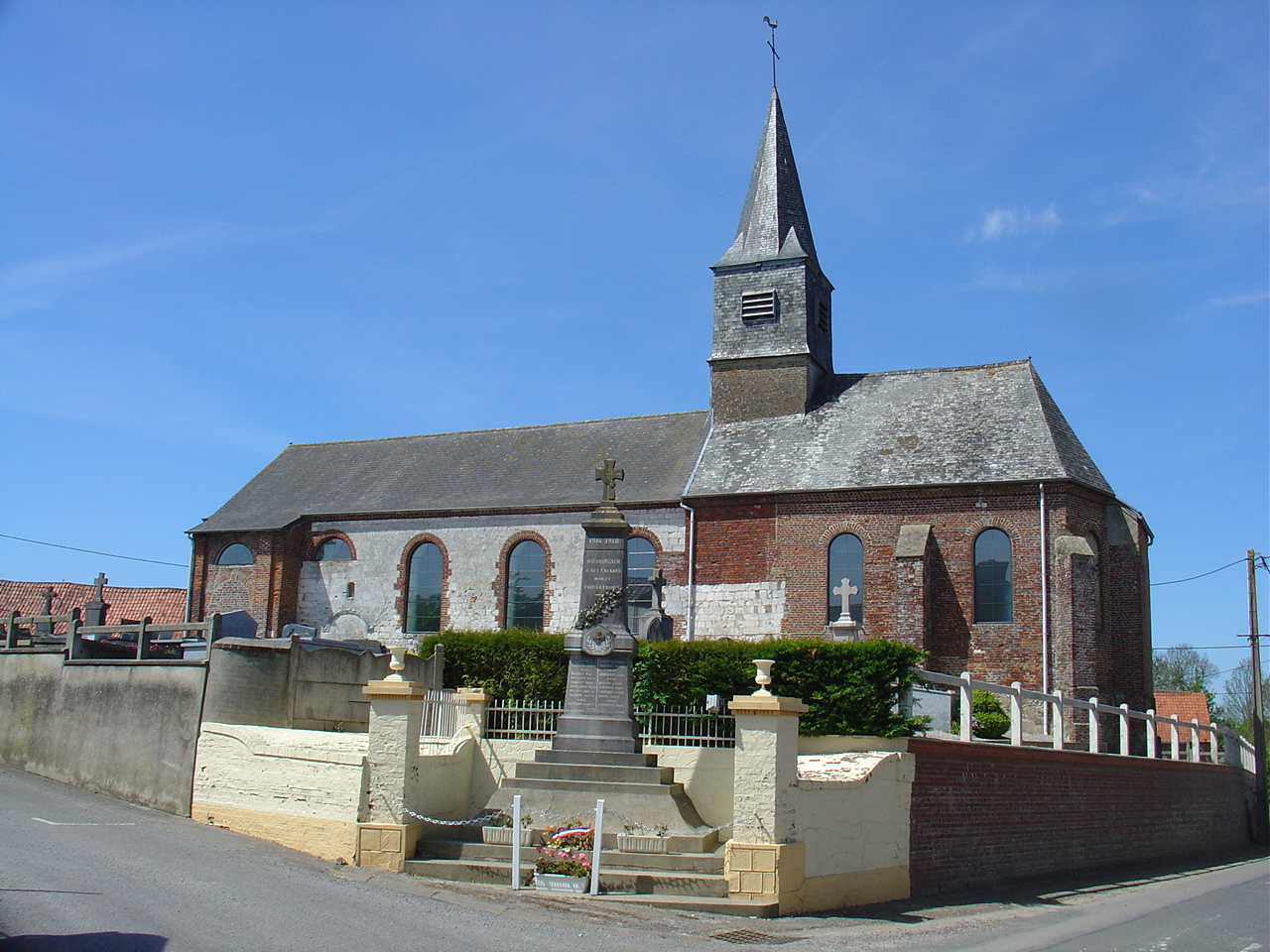
- The church of Wicquinghem
- Location of Wicquinghem
- Location within France Location within Hauts-de-France
- Coordinates: 50°34′35″N 1°57′44″E
- Country: France
- Region: Hauts-de-France
- Department: Pas-de-Calais
- Arrondissement: Montreuil
- Canton: Lumbres
- Intercommunality: Haut Pays du Montreuillois

Government
  - Mayor (2020–2026): Guy Delplanque
- Area^{1}: 6.8 km^{2} (2.6 sq mi)
- Elevation: 117 m (384 ft)
- Highest elevation: 175 m (574 ft)
- Lowest elevation: 106 m (348 ft)
- Population (2023): 267
  - Density: 39/km^{2} (100/sq mi)
- Time zone: UTC+01:00 (CET)
  - Summer (DST): UTC+02:00 (CEST)
- INSEE/Postal code: 62886 /62650
- ^{1} French Land Register data, which excludes lakes, ponds, glaciers > 1 km^{2} (0.386 sq mi or 247 acres) and river estuaries.

Wicquinghem (French pronunciation: [wikɛ̃ɡɑ̃]) is a commune in the Pas-de-Calais department in the Hauts-de-France region of France 19 km (12 mi) northeast of Montreuil-sur-Mer and 3 km (2 mi) east of Hucqueliers.

== Population ==
Historical population
Year	Pop.	±% p.a.
1968	257	—
1975	227	−1.76%
1982	232	+0.31%
1990	192	−2.34%
1999	179	−0.78%
2007	183	+0.28%
2012	234	+5.04%
2017	252	+1.49%
2023	267	+0.97%
Source: INSEE

== See also ==
- Communes of the Pas-de-Calais department
