= Maninghem =

- Commune
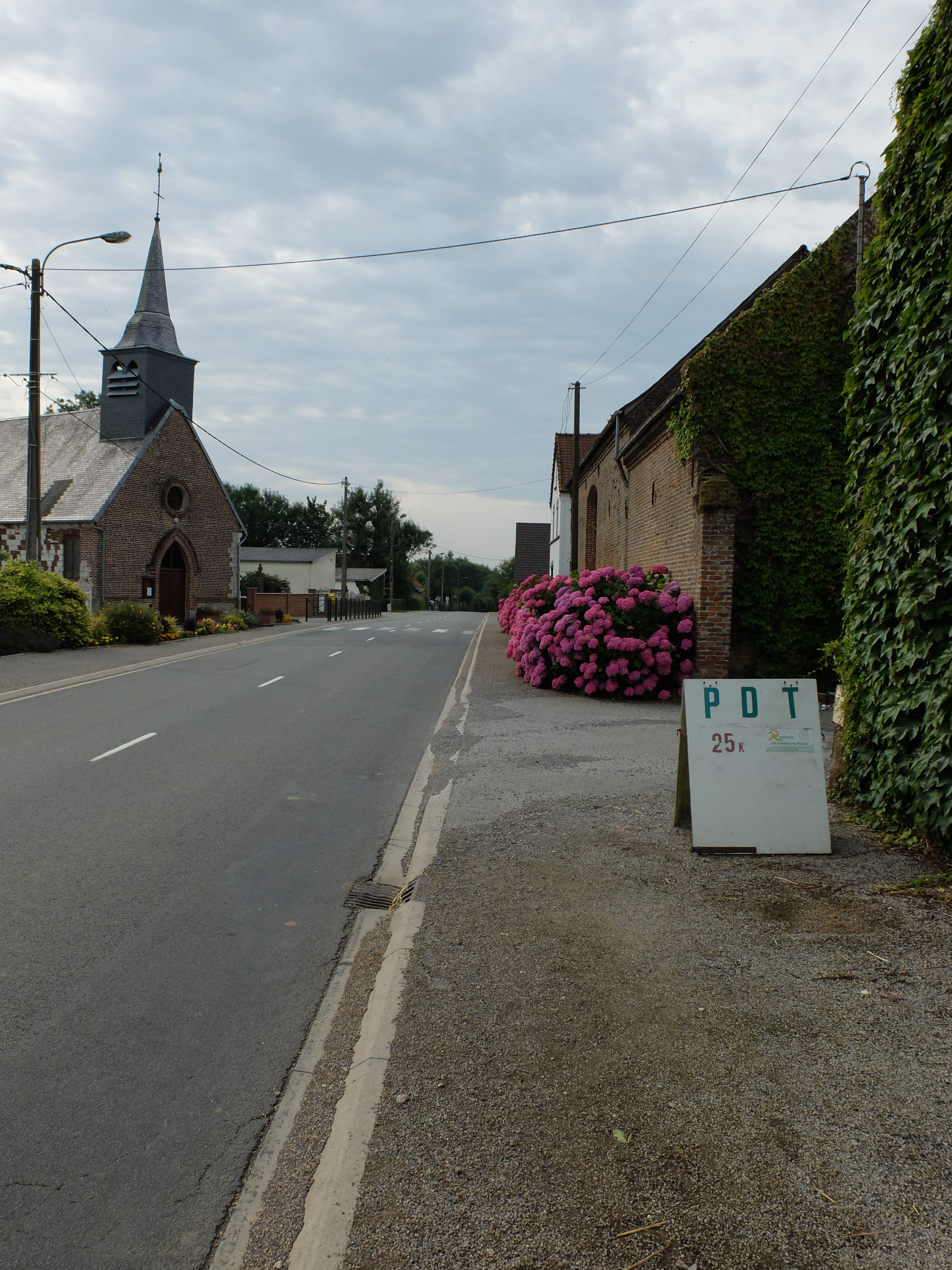
- The main road of Maninghem

- Coat of arms
- Location of Maninghem
- Location within France Location within Hauts-de-France
- Coordinates: 50°32′38″N 1°56′25″E
- Country: France
- Region: Hauts-de-France
- Department: Pas-de-Calais
- Arrondissement: Montreuil
- Canton: Lumbres
- Intercommunality: CC Haut Pays du Montreuillois

Government
  - Mayor (2020–2026): Philippe Leduc
- Area^{1}: 3.93 km^{2} (1.52 sq mi)
- Elevation: 190 m (620 ft)
- Highest elevation: 197 m (646 ft)
- Lowest elevation: 150 m (490 ft)
- Population (2023): 152
  - Density: 38.7/km^{2} (100/sq mi)
- Time zone: UTC+01:00 (CET)
  - Summer (DST): UTC+02:00 (CEST)
- INSEE/Postal code: 62545 /62650
- ^{1} French Land Register data, which excludes lakes, ponds, glaciers > 1 km^{2} (0.386 sq mi or 247 acres) and river estuaries.

Maninghem (French pronunciation: [manɛ̃ɡɑ̃]; Picard: Maninghin) is a commune in the Pas-de-Calais department in the Hauts-de-France region of France.

== Geography ==
Maninghem is situated 10 miles (16 km) northeast of Montreuil-sur-Mer, on the D343 road.

== Population ==
Historical population
| Year | Pop. | ±% p.a. |
|---|---|---|
| 1968 | 112 | — |
| 1975 | 121 | +1.11% |
| 1982 | 127 | +0.69% |
| 1990 | 161 | +3.01% |
| 1999 | 137 | −1.78% |
| 2007 | 144 | +0.62% |
| 2012 | 152 | +1.09% |
| 2017 | 151 | −0.13% |
| 2023 | 152 | +0.11% |
Source: INSEE

== See also ==
- Communes of the Pas-de-Calais department
