= Preures =

- Commune
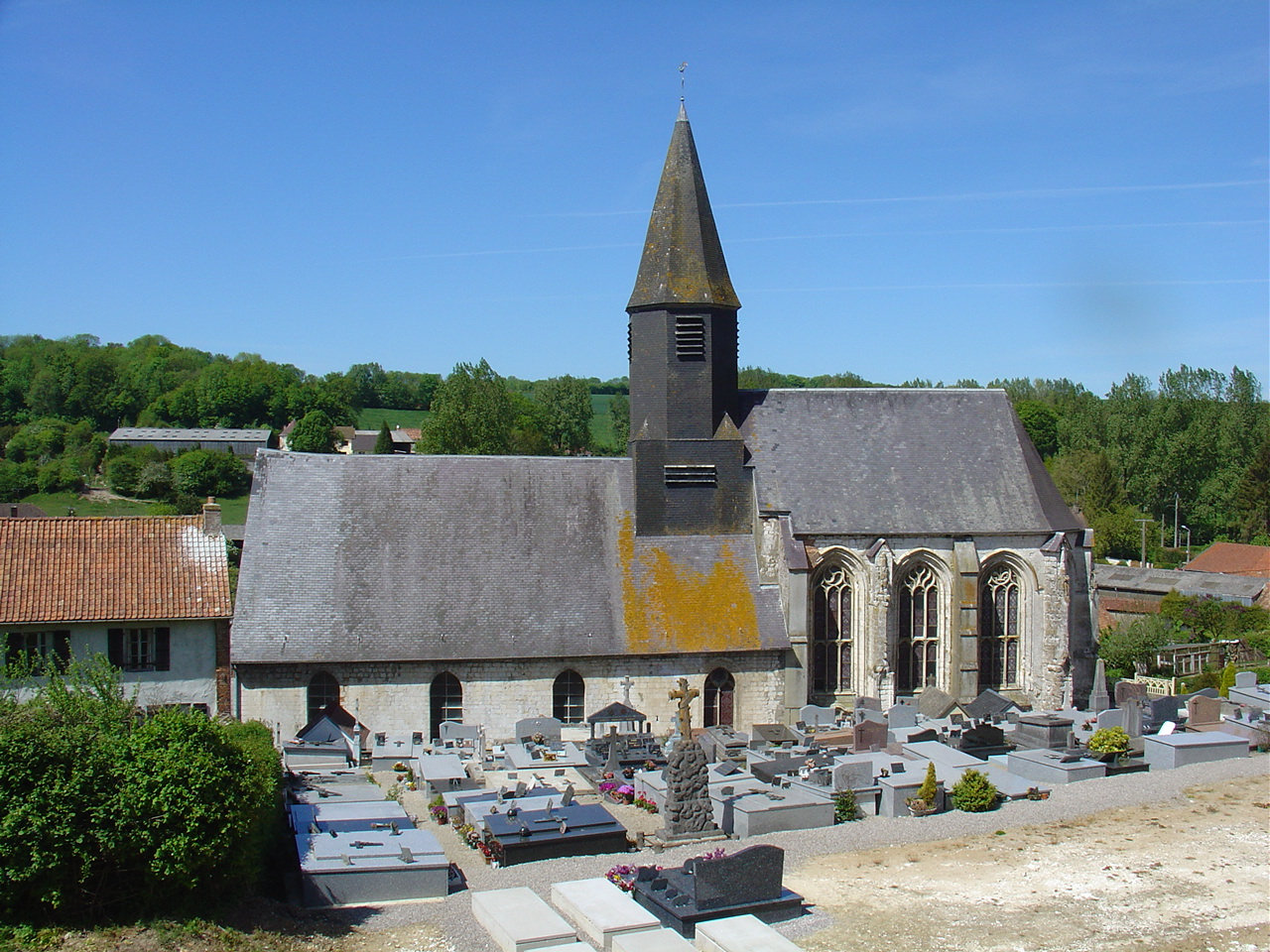
- The church of Preures

- Coat of arms
- Location of Preures
- Location within France Location within Hauts-de-France
- Coordinates: 50°34′21″N 1°52′44″E
- Country: France
- Region: Hauts-de-France
- Department: Pas-de-Calais
- Arrondissement: Montreuil
- Canton: Lumbres
- Intercommunality: CC Haut Pays du Montreuillois

Government
  - Mayor (2020–2026): Christophe Coffre
- Area^{1}: 15.87 km^{2} (6.13 sq mi)
- Elevation: 84 m (276 ft)
- Highest elevation: 167 m (548 ft)
- Lowest elevation: 61 m (200 ft)
- Population (2023): 642
  - Density: 40.5/km^{2} (105/sq mi)
- Time zone: UTC+01:00 (CET)
  - Summer (DST): UTC+02:00 (CEST)
- INSEE/Postal code: 62670 /62650
- ^{1} French Land Register data, which excludes lakes, ponds, glaciers > 1 km^{2} (0.386 sq mi or 247 acres) and river estuaries.

Preures (French pronunciation: [pʁœʁ]) is a commune in the Pas-de-Calais department in the Hauts-de-France region of France, crossed by the Baillons, a tributary of the Canche river, 15 km northeast of Montreuil-sur-Mer and 25 km south-east of Boulogne-sur-Mer.

== Population ==
The inhabitants are called Preurois or Preuroises in French.

Historical population
| Year | Pop. | ±% p.a. |
|---|---|---|
| 1968 | 514 | — |
| 1975 | 472 | −1.21% |
| 1982 | 509 | +1.08% |
| 1990 | 426 | −2.20% |
| 1999 | 448 | +0.56% |
| 2007 | 524 | +1.98% |
| 2012 | 577 | +1.95% |
| 2017 | 605 | +0.95% |
| 2023 | 642 | +0.99% |
Source: INSEE

== See also ==
- Communes of the Pas-de-Calais department
