= Coupelle-Neuve =

- Commune
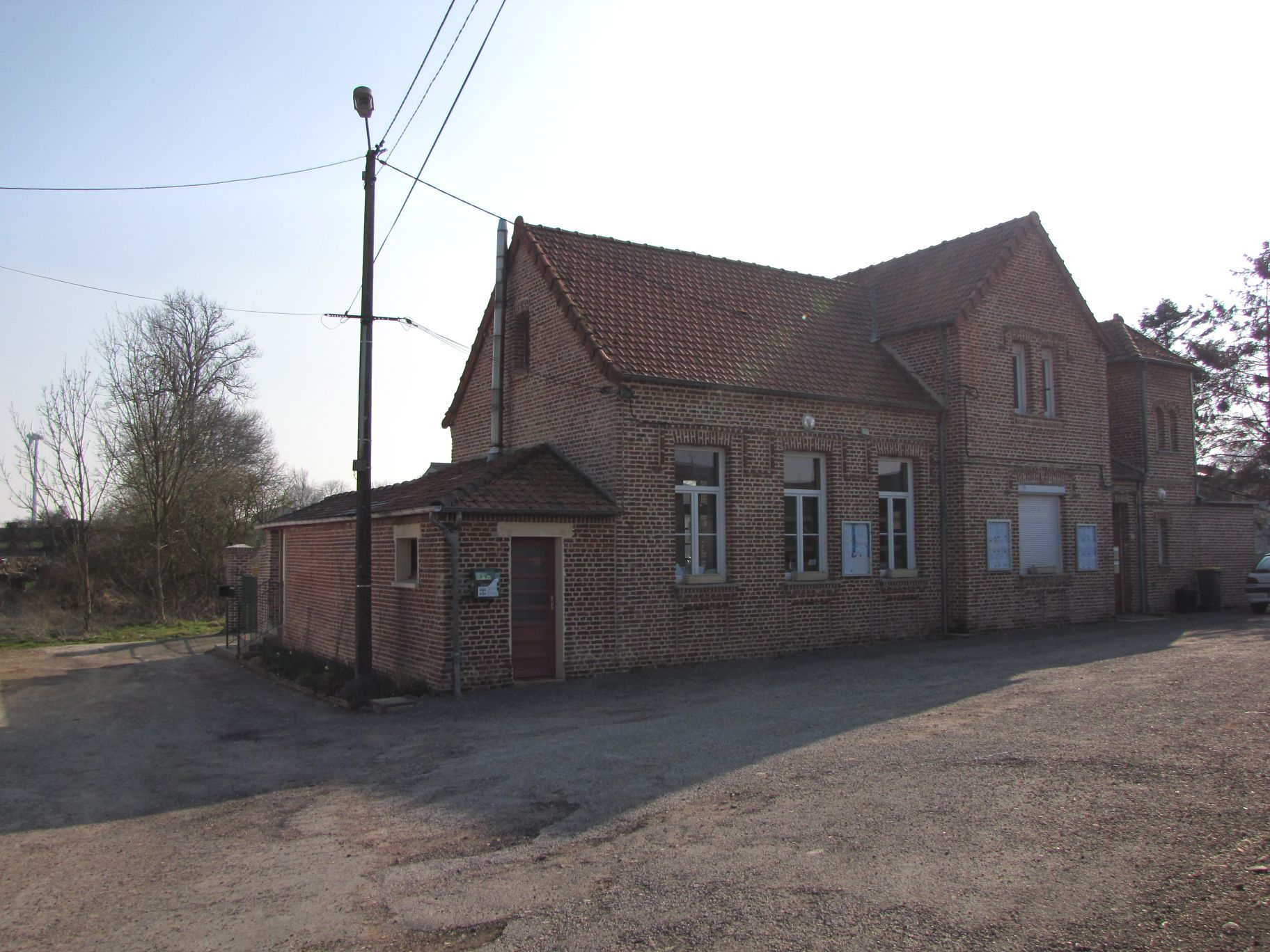
- The town hall and school of Coupelle-Neuve

- Coat of arms
- Location of Coupelle-Neuve
- Location within France Location within Hauts-de-France
- Coordinates: 50°30′03″N 2°07′15″E
- Country: France
- Region: Hauts-de-France
- Department: Pas-de-Calais
- Arrondissement: Montreuil
- Canton: Fruges
- Intercommunality: CC Haut Pays du Montreuillois

Government
  - Mayor (2020–2026): Emmanuel Marguet
- Area^{1}: 4.54 km^{2} (1.75 sq mi)
- Elevation: 130 m (430 ft)
- Highest elevation: 157 m (515 ft)
- Lowest elevation: 113 m (371 ft)
- Population (2023): 146
  - Density: 32.2/km^{2} (83.3/sq mi)
- Time zone: UTC+01:00 (CET)
  - Summer (DST): UTC+02:00 (CEST)
- INSEE/Postal code: 62246 /62310
- ^{1} French Land Register data, which excludes lakes, ponds, glaciers > 1 km^{2} (0.386 sq mi or 247 acres) and river estuaries.

Coupelle-Neuve (French pronunciation: [kupɛl nœv]) is a commune in the Pas-de-Calais department in the Hauts-de-France region of France.

== Geography ==
A village situated some 16 miles (26 km) east of Montreuil-sur-Mer on the D104 road.

== Population ==
Historical population
Year	Pop.	±% p.a.
1968	144	—
1975	128	−1.67%
1982	160	+3.24%
1990	139	−1.74%
1999	161	+1.65%
2007	197	+2.55%
2012	188	−0.93%
2017	161	−3.05%
2023	146	−1.62%
Source: INSEE

== See also ==
- Communes of the Pas-de-Calais department
