= Aix-en-Ergny =

- Commune
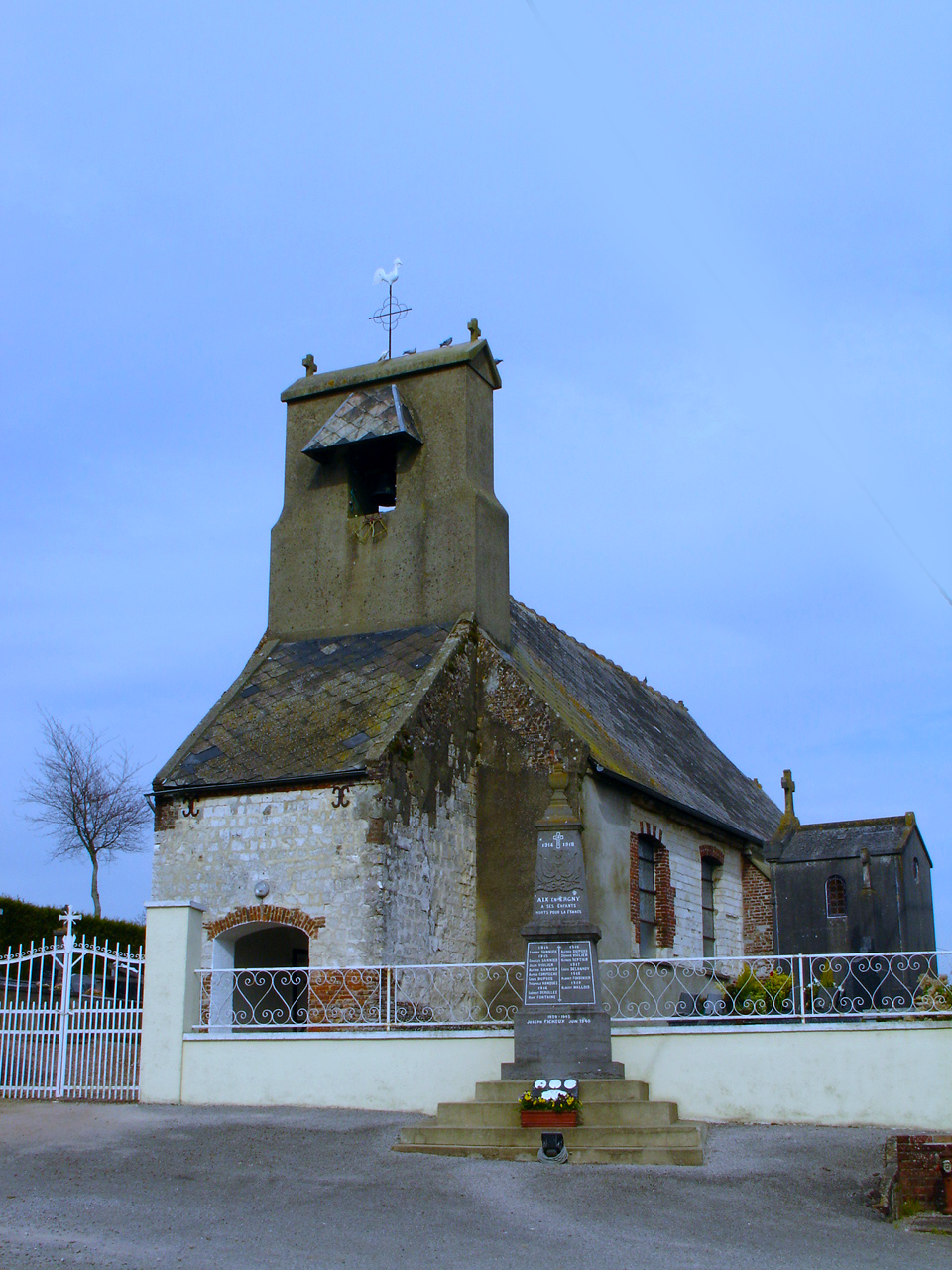
- The church of Aix-en-Ergny

- Coat of arms
- Location of Aix-en-Ergny
- Location within France Location within Hauts-de-France
- Coordinates: 50°34′59″N 1°59′53″E
- Country: France
- Region: Hauts-de-France
- Department: Pas-de-Calais
- Arrondissement: Montreuil
- Canton: Lumbres
- Intercommunality: Haut Pays du Montreuillois

Government
  - Mayor (2020–2026): David Gillet
- Area^{1}: 4.83 km^{2} (1.86 sq mi)
- Elevation: 107 m (351 ft)
- Highest elevation: 167 m (548 ft)
- Lowest elevation: 97 m (318 ft)
- Population (2023): 194
  - Density: 40.2/km^{2} (104/sq mi)
- Time zone: UTC+01:00 (CET)
  - Summer (DST): UTC+02:00 (CEST)
- INSEE/Postal code: 62017 /62650
- ^{1} French Land Register data, which excludes lakes, ponds, glaciers > 1 km^{2} (0.386 sq mi or 247 acres) and river estuaries.

Aix-en-Ergny (French pronunciation: [ɛks ɑ̃n‿ɛʁɲi]) is a commune in the Pas-de-Calais department in northern France.

== Geography ==
A small village situated some 20 miles (32 km) southeast of Boulogne-sur-Mer, on the D148E road.

== Population ==
Historical population
| Year | Pop. | ±% p.a. |
|---|---|---|
| 1968 | 159 | — |
| 1975 | 147 | −1.11% |
| 1982 | 128 | −1.96% |
| 1990 | 120 | −0.80% |
| 1999 | 104 | −1.58% |
| 2007 | 148 | +4.51% |
| 2012 | 180 | +3.99% |
| 2017 | 189 | +0.98% |
| 2023 | 194 | +0.44% |
Source: INSEE

== See also ==
- Communes of the Pas-de-Calais department
