= Crépy, Pas-de-Calais =

Crépy
- Commune
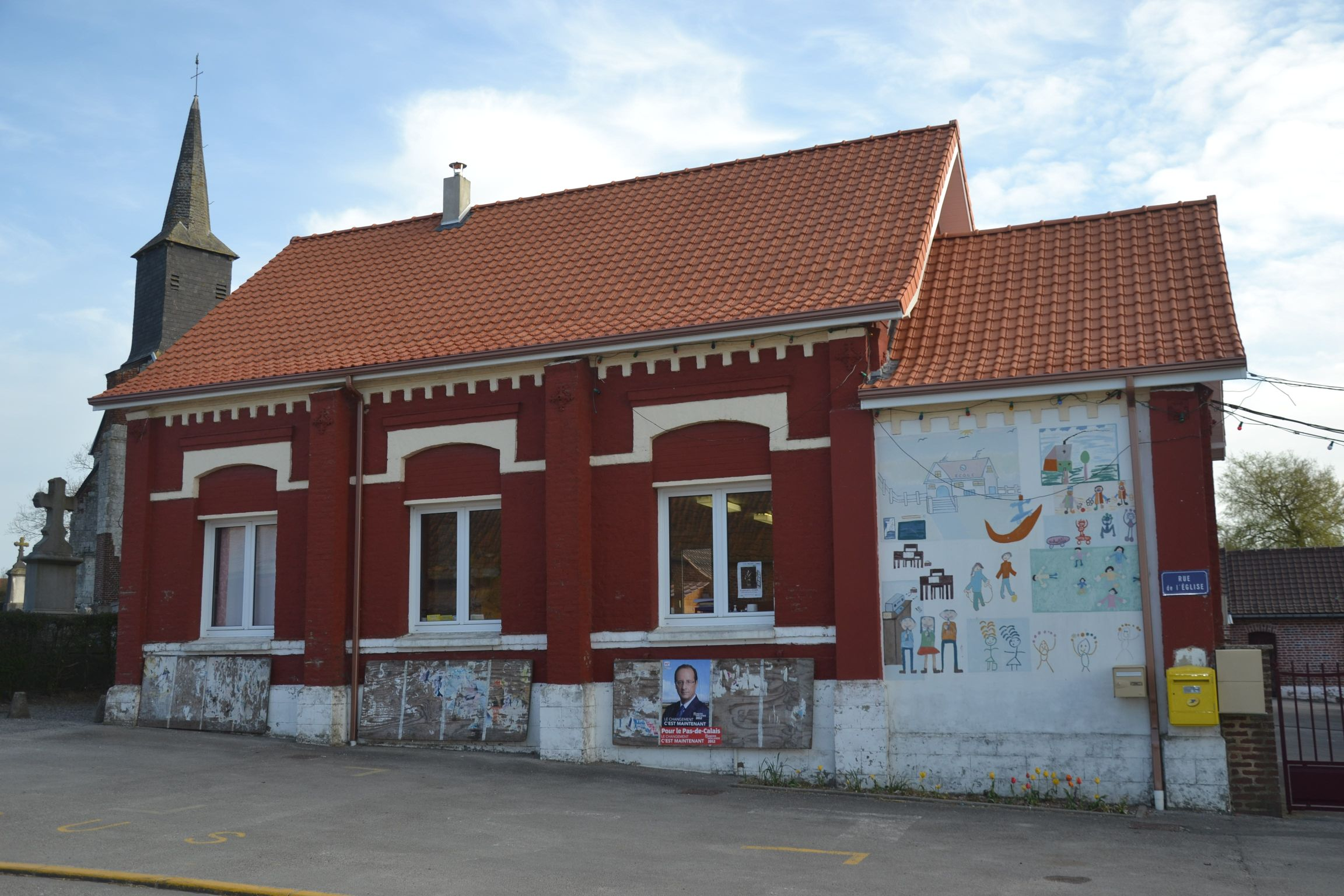
- The town hall and school of Crépy

- Coat of arms
- Location of Crépy
- Location within France Location within Hauts-de-France
- Coordinates: 50°28′32″N 2°12′13″E
- Country: France
- Region: Hauts-de-France
- Department: Pas-de-Calais
- Arrondissement: Montreuil
- Canton: Fruges
- Intercommunality: CC Haut Pays du Montreuillois

Government
  - Mayor (2024–2026): Yolande Debruyne
- Area^{1}: 6.91 km^{2} (2.67 sq mi)
- Elevation: 124 m (407 ft)
- Highest elevation: 142 m (466 ft)
- Lowest elevation: 72 m (236 ft)
- Population (2023): 159
  - Density: 23.0/km^{2} (59.6/sq mi)
- Time zone: UTC+01:00 (CET)
  - Summer (DST): UTC+02:00 (CEST)
- INSEE/Postal code: 62256 /62310
- ^{1} French Land Register data, which excludes lakes, ponds, glaciers > 1 km^{2} (0.386 sq mi or 247 acres) and river estuaries.

Crépy (French pronunciation: [kʁepi]) is a commune in the Pas-de-Calais department in the Hauts-de-France region of France about 20 miles (32 km) east of Montreuil-sur-Mer.

== Population ==
Historical population
Year	Pop.	±% p.a.
1968	189	—
1975	183	−0.46%
1982	176	−0.56%
1990	176	+0.00%
1999	170	−0.38%
2007	149	−1.63%
2012	150	+0.13%
2017	149	−0.13%
2023	159	+1.09%
Source: INSEE

== See also ==
- Communes of the Pas-de-Calais department
