= Avondance =

- Commune
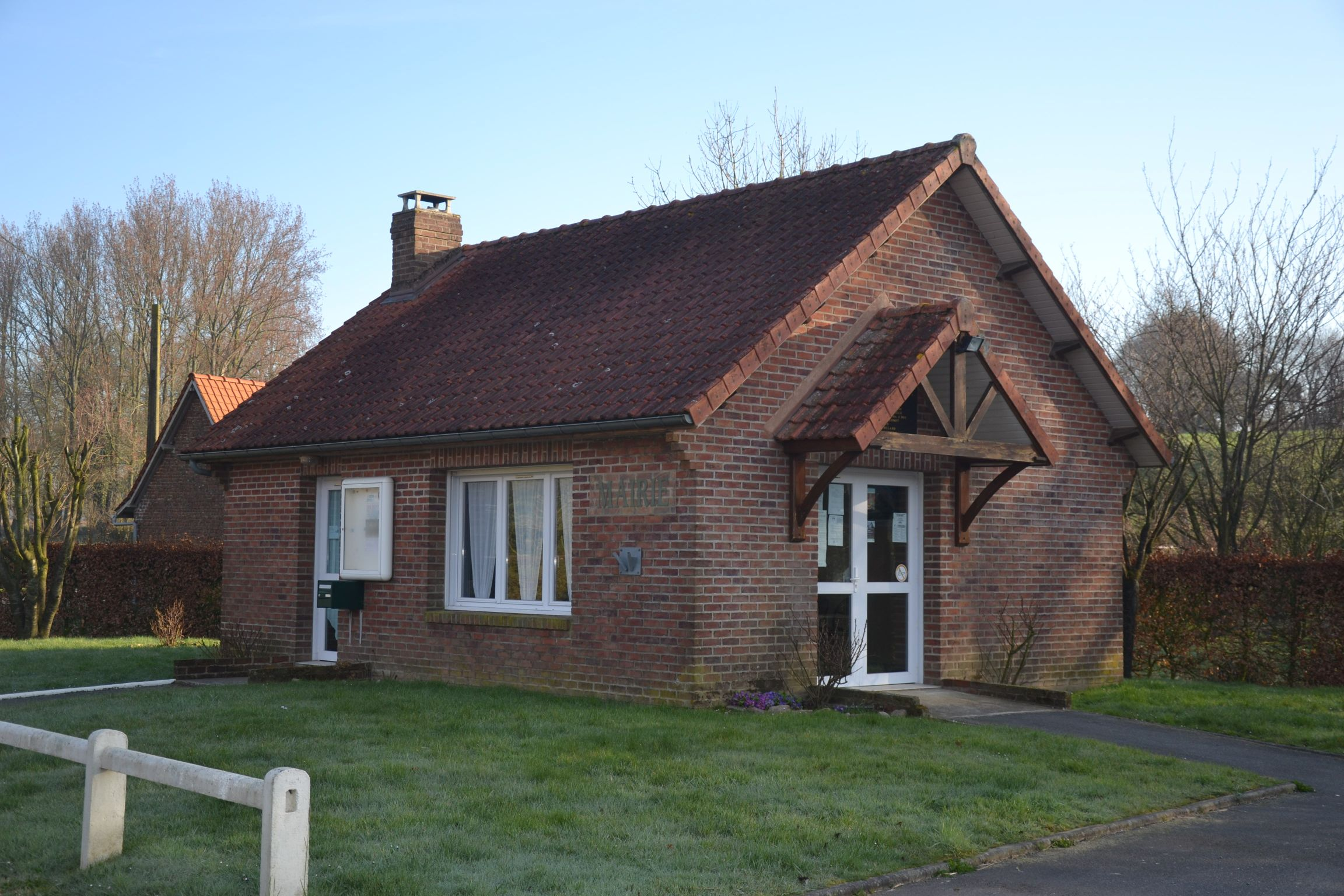
- The town hall of Avondance

- Coat of arms
- Location of Avondance
- Location within France Location within Hauts-de-France
- Coordinates: 50°28′38″N 2°05′55″E
- Country: France
- Region: Hauts-de-France
- Department: Pas-de-Calais
- Arrondissement: Montreuil
- Canton: Fruges
- Intercommunality: CC Haut Pays du Montreuillois

Government
  - Mayor (2020–2026): Pierre Desmons
- Area^{1}: 2.19 km^{2} (0.85 sq mi)
- Elevation: 129 m (423 ft)
- Highest elevation: 144 m (472 ft)
- Lowest elevation: 100 m (330 ft)
- Population (2023): 33
  - Density: 15/km^{2} (39/sq mi)
- Time zone: UTC+01:00 (CET)
  - Summer (DST): UTC+02:00 (CEST)
- INSEE/Postal code: 62066 /62310
- ^{1} French Land Register data, which excludes lakes, ponds, glaciers > 1 km^{2} (0.386 sq mi or 247 acres) and river estuaries.

Avondance (French pronunciation: [avɔ̃dɑ̃s]) is a commune in the Pas-de-Calais department in northern France.

== Geography ==
A tiny village situated some 15 miles (24 km) east of Montreuil-sur-Mer, on the D154 road, the source of the small river Planquette.

== Population ==
Historical population
Year	Pop.	±% p.a.
1968	44	—
1975	42	−0.66%
1982	36	−2.18%
1990	32	−1.46%
1999	32	+0.00%
2007	38	+2.17%
2012	44	+2.98%
2017	38	−2.89%
2023	33	−2.32%
Source: INSEE

== See also ==
- Communes of the Pas-de-Calais department
