= Matringhem =

- Commune
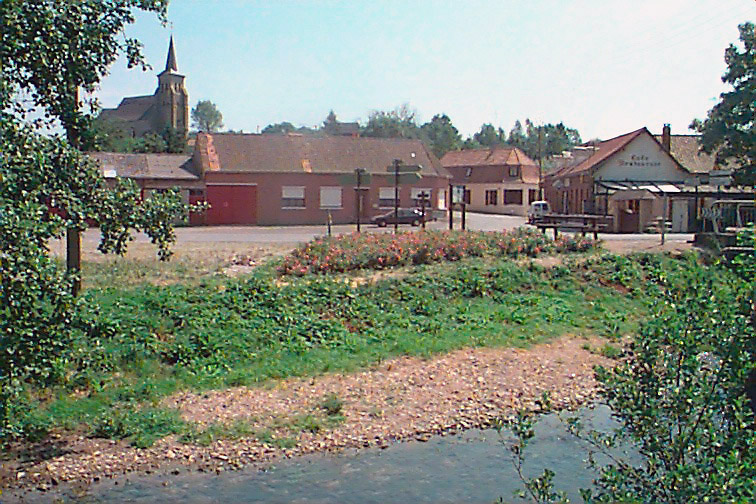
- Matringhem with the Lys in the foreground

- Coat of arms
- Location of Matringhem
- Location within France Location within Hauts-de-France
- Coordinates: 50°32′44″N 2°09′57″E
- Country: France
- Region: Hauts-de-France
- Department: Pas-de-Calais
- Arrondissement: Montreuil
- Canton: Fruges
- Intercommunality: CC Haut Pays du Montreuillois

Government
  - Mayor (2020–2026): Michel Doutriaux
- Area^{1}: 4.47 km^{2} (1.73 sq mi)
- Elevation: 89 m (292 ft)
- Highest elevation: 186 m (610 ft)
- Lowest elevation: 75 m (246 ft)
- Population (2023): 177
  - Density: 39.6/km^{2} (103/sq mi)
- Time zone: UTC+01:00 (CET)
  - Summer (DST): UTC+02:00 (CEST)
- INSEE/Postal code: 62562 /62310
- ^{1} French Land Register data, which excludes lakes, ponds, glaciers > 1 km^{2} (0.386 sq mi or 247 acres) and river estuaries.

Matringhem is a commune in the Pas-de-Calais department in the Hauts-de-France region of France.

== Geography ==
Matringhem is situated in the valley of the Lys river, 20 miles (32 km) northeast of Montreuil-sur-Mer, at the D131 and D104 crossroads.

== Population ==
Historical population
Year	Pop.	±% p.a.
1968	210	—
1975	206	−0.27%
1982	204	−0.14%
1990	192	−0.75%
1999	174	−1.09%
2007	177	+0.21%
2012	191	+1.53%
2017	185	−0.64%
2023	177	−0.73%
Source: INSEE

== Places of interest ==
- The church of St.Omer

== See also ==
- Communes of the Pas-de-Calais department
