= Enquin-sur-Baillons =

- Commune
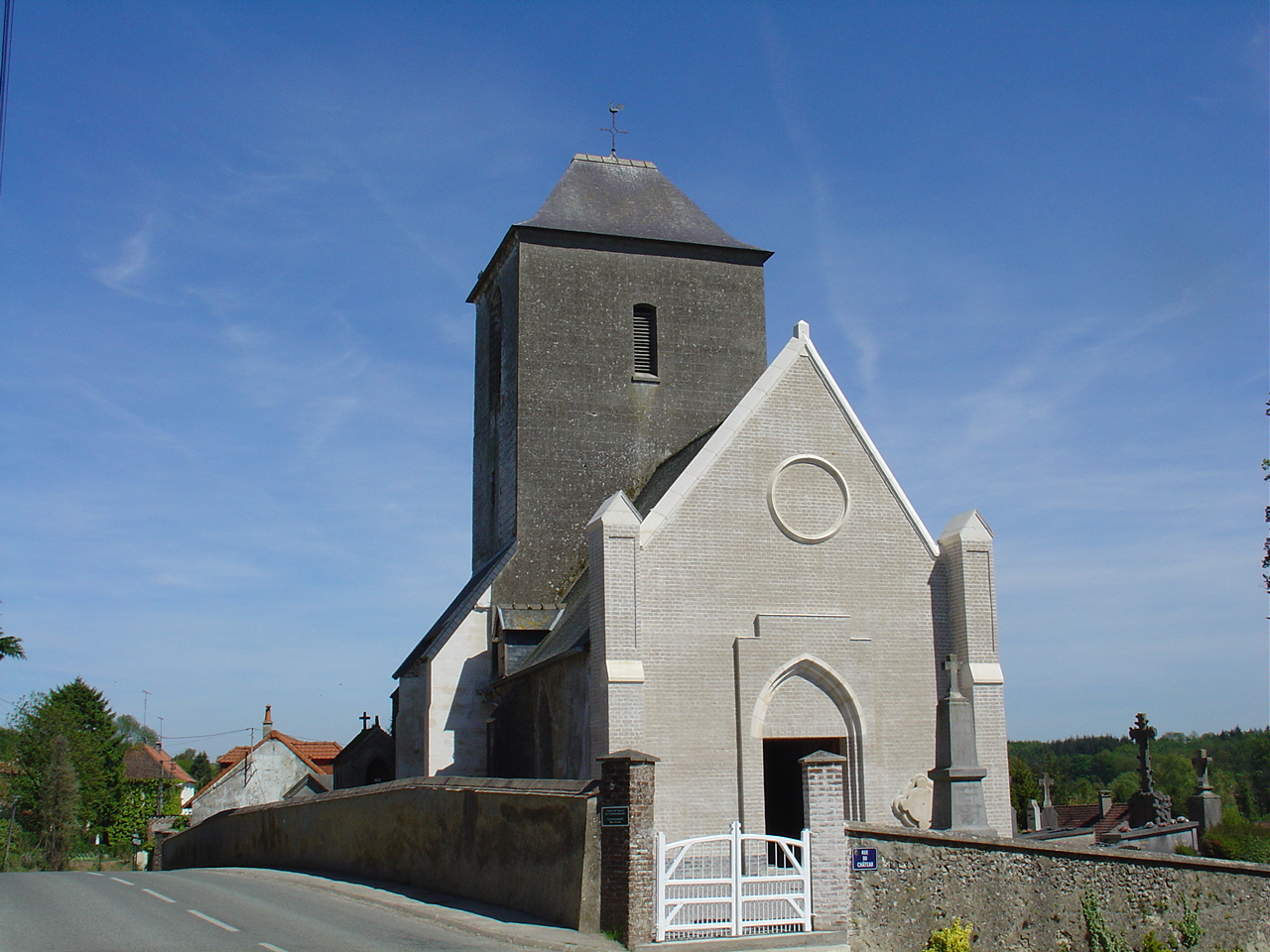
- The church of Enquin-sur-Baillons

- Coat of arms
- Location of Enquin-sur-Baillons
- Location within France Location within Hauts-de-France
- Coordinates: 50°34′23″N 1°50′17″E
- Country: France
- Region: Hauts-de-France
- Department: Pas-de-Calais
- Arrondissement: Montreuil
- Canton: Lumbres
- Intercommunality: CC Haut Pays du Montreuillois

Government
  - Mayor (2020–2026): Pierre André Leleu
- Area^{1}: 4.98 km^{2} (1.92 sq mi)
- Elevation: 60 m (200 ft)
- Highest elevation: 151 m (495 ft)
- Lowest elevation: 46 m (151 ft)
- Population (2023): 237
  - Density: 47.6/km^{2} (123/sq mi)
- Time zone: UTC+01:00 (CET)
  - Summer (DST): UTC+02:00 (CEST)
- INSEE/Postal code: 62296 /62650
- ^{1} French Land Register data, which excludes lakes, ponds, glaciers > 1 km^{2} (0.386 sq mi or 247 acres) and river estuaries.

Enquin-sur-Baillons (French pronunciation: [ɑ̃kɛ̃ syʁ bajɔ̃]) is a commune in the Pas-de-Calais department in the Hauts-de-France region of France about 8 miles (12 km) northeast of Montreuil-sur-Mer.

== Population ==
Historical population
Year	Pop.	±% p.a.
1968	153	—
1975	152	−0.09%
1982	156	+0.37%
1990	159	+0.24%
1999	173	+0.94%
2007	201	+1.89%
2012	262	+5.44%
2017	280	+1.34%
2023	237	−2.74%
Source: INSEE

== See also ==
- Communes of the Pas-de-Calais department
