= Ergny =

- Commune
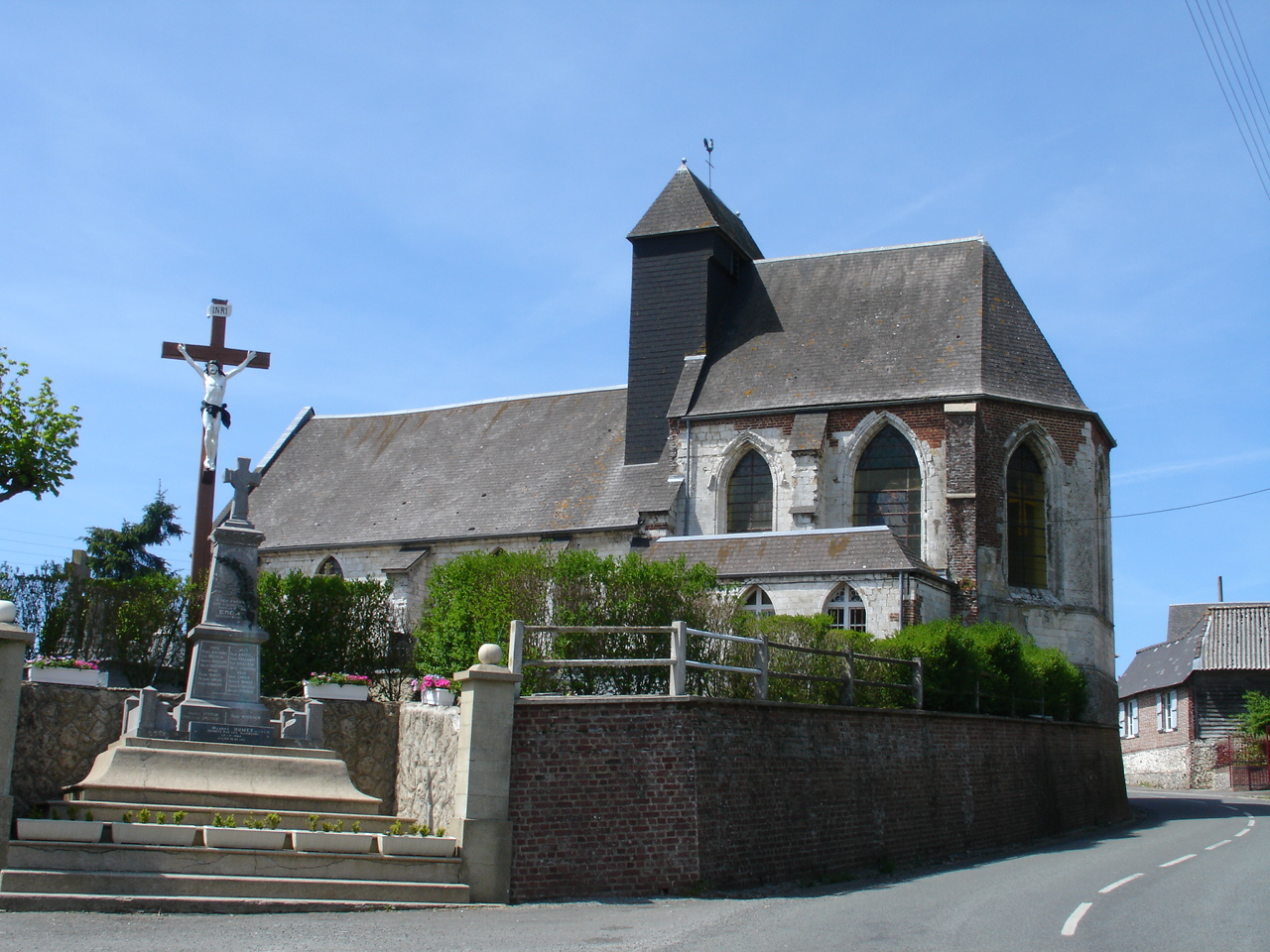
- The church of Ergny

- Coat of arms
- Location of Ergny
- Location within France Location within Hauts-de-France
- Coordinates: 50°35′03″N 1°58′54″E
- Country: France
- Region: Hauts-de-France
- Department: Pas-de-Calais
- Arrondissement: Montreuil
- Canton: Lumbres
- Intercommunality: CC Haut Pays du Montreuillois

Government
  - Mayor (2020–2026): Bruno Carlu
- Area^{1}: 9.29 km^{2} (3.59 sq mi)
- Elevation: 113 m (371 ft)
- Highest elevation: 166 m (545 ft)
- Lowest elevation: 101 m (331 ft)
- Population (2023): 230
  - Density: 25/km^{2} (64/sq mi)
- Time zone: UTC+01:00 (CET)
  - Summer (DST): UTC+02:00 (CEST)
- INSEE/Postal code: 62302 /62650
- ^{1} French Land Register data, which excludes lakes, ponds, glaciers > 1 km^{2} (0.386 sq mi or 247 acres) and river estuaries.

Ergny (French pronunciation: [ɛʁɲi]) is a commune in the Pas-de-Calais department in the Hauts-de-France region of France about 14 miles (23 km) northeast of Montreuil-sur-Mer.

== Population ==
Historical population
Year	Pop.	±% p.a.
1968	250	—
1975	221	−1.75%
1982	199	−1.49%
1990	186	−0.84%
1999	173	−0.80%
2007	218	+2.93%
2012	226	+0.72%
2017	233	+0.61%
2023	230	−0.22%
Source: INSEE

== See also ==
- Communes of the Pas-de-Calais department
