= Clenleu =

- Commune
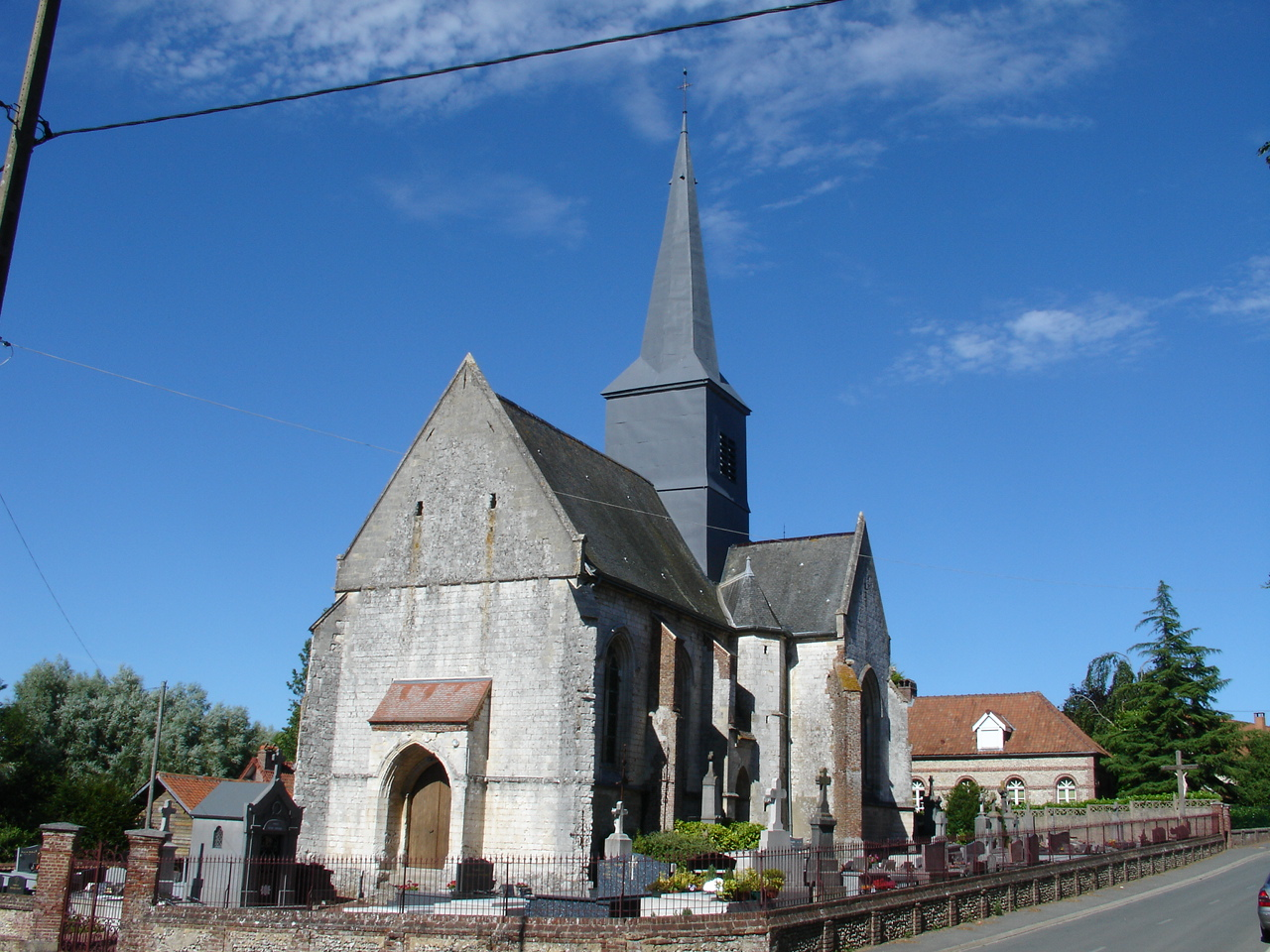
- The church of Clenleu

- Coat of arms
- Location of Clenleu
- Location within France Location within Hauts-de-France
- Coordinates: 50°31′25″N 1°52′17″E
- Country: France
- Region: Hauts-de-France
- Department: Pas-de-Calais
- Arrondissement: Montreuil
- Canton: Lumbres
- Intercommunality: CC Haut Pays du Montreuillois

Government
  - Mayor (2020–2026): Hervé Davelu
- Area^{1}: 7.26 km^{2} (2.80 sq mi)
- Elevation: 71 m (233 ft)
- Highest elevation: 166 m (545 ft)
- Lowest elevation: 57 m (187 ft)
- Population (2023): 186
  - Density: 25.6/km^{2} (66.4/sq mi)
- Time zone: UTC+01:00 (CET)
  - Summer (DST): UTC+02:00 (CEST)
- INSEE/Postal code: 62227 /62650
- ^{1} French Land Register data, which excludes lakes, ponds, glaciers > 1 km^{2} (0.386 sq mi or 247 acres) and river estuaries.

Clenleu (French pronunciation: [klɑ̃lø]) is a commune in the Pas-de-Calais department in the Hauts-de-France region of France.

== Geography ==
A village situated some 5 miles (8 km) northeast of Montreuil-sur-Mer on the D152 and D128 road junction.

== Population ==
Historical population
| Year | Pop. | ±% p.a. |
|---|---|---|
| 1968 | 182 | — |
| 1975 | 170 | −0.97% |
| 1982 | 181 | +0.90% |
| 1990 | 172 | −0.64% |
| 1999 | 183 | +0.69% |
| 2007 | 172 | −0.77% |
| 2012 | 189 | +1.90% |
| 2017 | 195 | +0.63% |
| 2023 | 186 | −0.78% |
Source: INSEE

== See also ==
- Communes of the Pas-de-Calais department
