= Verchocq =

Verchocq Everkok
- Commune
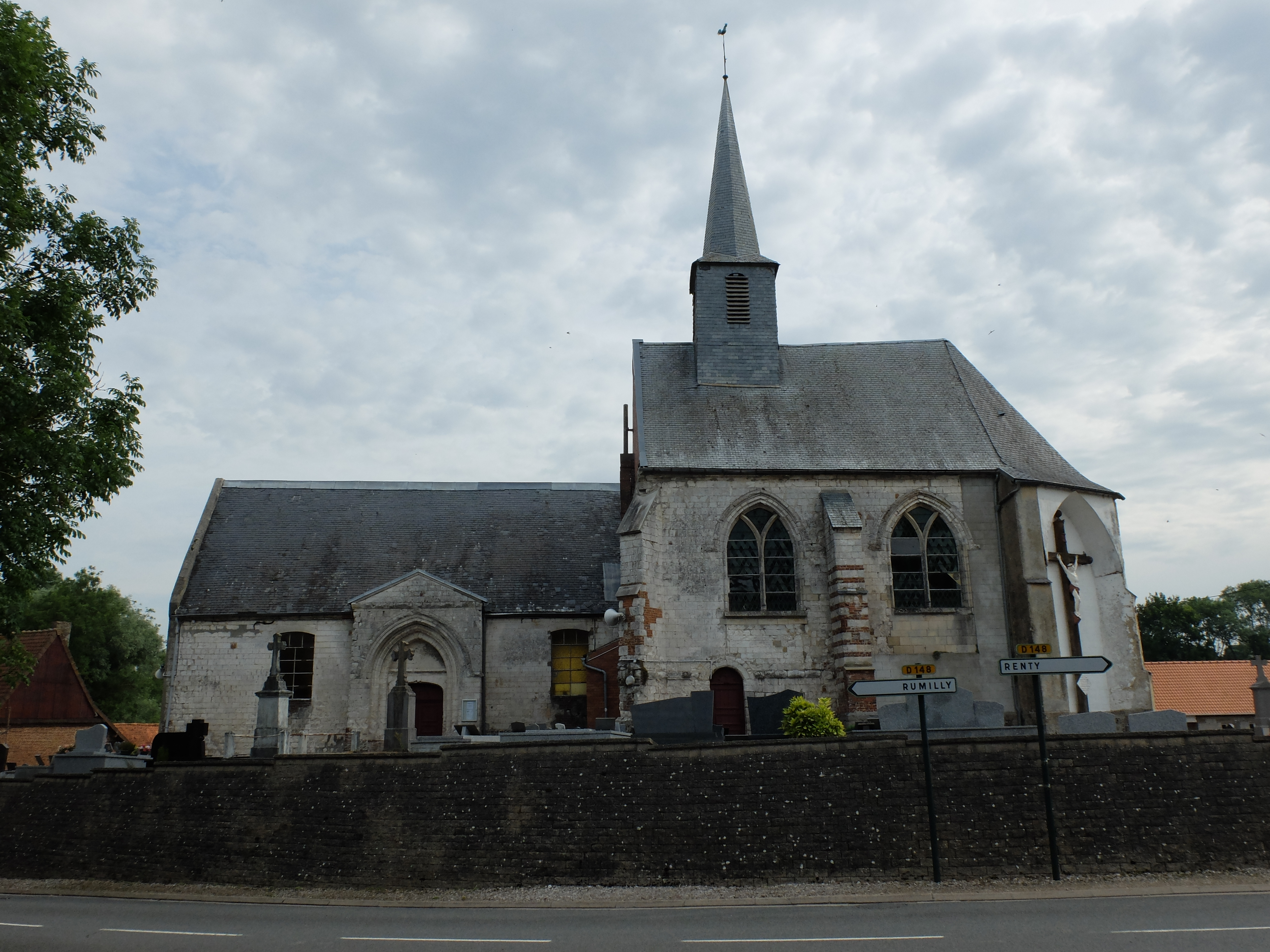
- The church of Verchocq

- Coat of arms
- Location of Verchocq
- Location within France Location within Hauts-de-France
- Coordinates: 50°33′55″N 2°02′11″E
- Country: France
- Region: Hauts-de-France
- Department: Pas-de-Calais
- Arrondissement: Montreuil
- Canton: Lumbres
- Intercommunality: CC Haut Pays du Montreuillois

Government
  - Mayor (2020–2026): Patrick Huguet
- Area^{1}: 15.56 km^{2} (6.01 sq mi)
- Elevation: 97 m (318 ft)
- Highest elevation: 192 m (630 ft)
- Lowest elevation: 87 m (285 ft)
- Population (2023): 665
  - Density: 42.7/km^{2} (111/sq mi)
- Time zone: UTC+01:00 (CET)
  - Summer (DST): UTC+02:00 (CEST)
- INSEE/Postal code: 62844 /62560
- ^{1} French Land Register data, which excludes lakes, ponds, glaciers > 1 km^{2} (0.386 sq mi or 247 acres) and river estuaries.

Verchocq (French pronunciation: [vɛʁʃɔk]; West Flemish: Everkok) is a commune in the Pas-de-Calais department in the Hauts-de-France region of France.

== Geography ==
Verchocq is located 15 miles (24 km) northeast of Montreuil-sur-Mer at the D129 and D148 road junction.

== Population ==
Historical population
Year	Pop.	±% p.a.
1968	633	—
1975	577	−1.31%
1982	590	+0.32%
1990	553	−0.81%
1999	523	−0.62%
2007	581	+1.32%
2012	638	+1.89%
2017	645	+0.22%
2023	665	+0.51%
Source: INSEE

== See also ==
- Communes of the Pas-de-Calais department
