= Radinghem =

Radinghem Radingem
- Commune
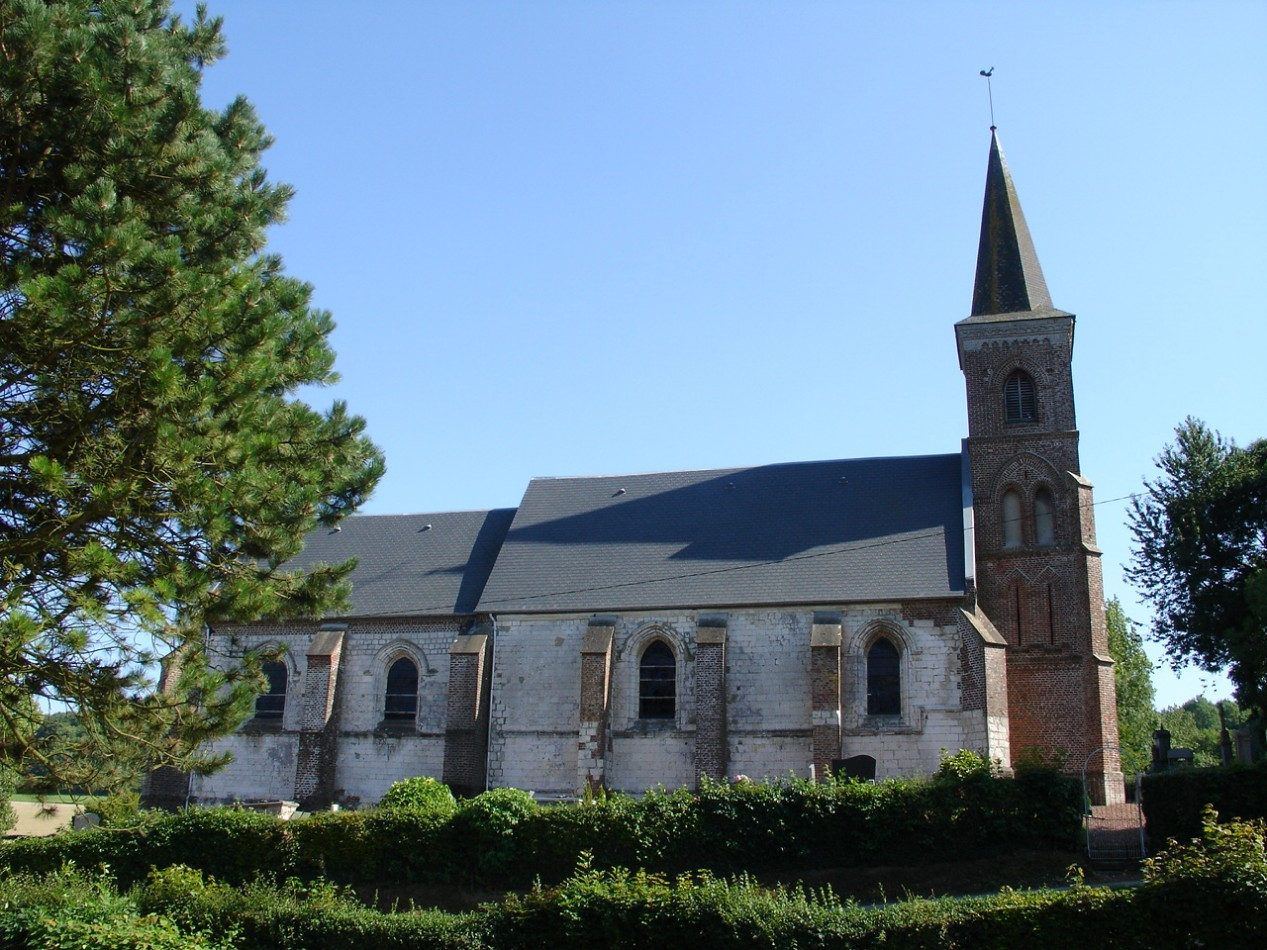
- The church of Radinghem

- Coat of arms
- Location of Radinghem
- Location within France Location within Hauts-de-France
- Coordinates: 50°32′52″N 2°07′09″E
- Country: France
- Region: Hauts-de-France
- Department: Pas-de-Calais
- Arrondissement: Montreuil
- Canton: Fruges
- Intercommunality: Haut Pays du Montreuillois

Government
  - Mayor (2020–2026): Michaël Baheux
- Area^{1}: 4.93 km^{2} (1.90 sq mi)
- Elevation: 103 m (338 ft)
- Highest elevation: 171 m (561 ft)
- Lowest elevation: 79 m (259 ft)
- Population (2023): 263
  - Density: 53.3/km^{2} (138/sq mi)
- Time zone: UTC+01:00 (CET)
  - Summer (DST): UTC+02:00 (CEST)
- INSEE/Postal code: 62685 /62310
- ^{1} French Land Register data, which excludes lakes, ponds, glaciers > 1 km^{2} (0.386 sq mi or 247 acres) and river estuaries.

Radinghem (French pronunciation: [ʁadɛ̃ɡɑ̃]; West Flemish: Radingem) is a commune in the Pas-de-Calais department in the Hauts-de-France region of France 20 miles (32 km) northeast of Montreuil-sur-Mer.

== Population ==
Historical population
Year	Pop.	±% p.a.
1968	166	—
1975	151	−1.34%
1982	149	−0.19%
1990	197	+3.55%
1999	221	+1.29%
2007	285	+3.23%
2012	290	+0.35%
2017	275	−1.06%
2023	263	−0.74%
Source: INSEE
