= Mencas =

- Commune
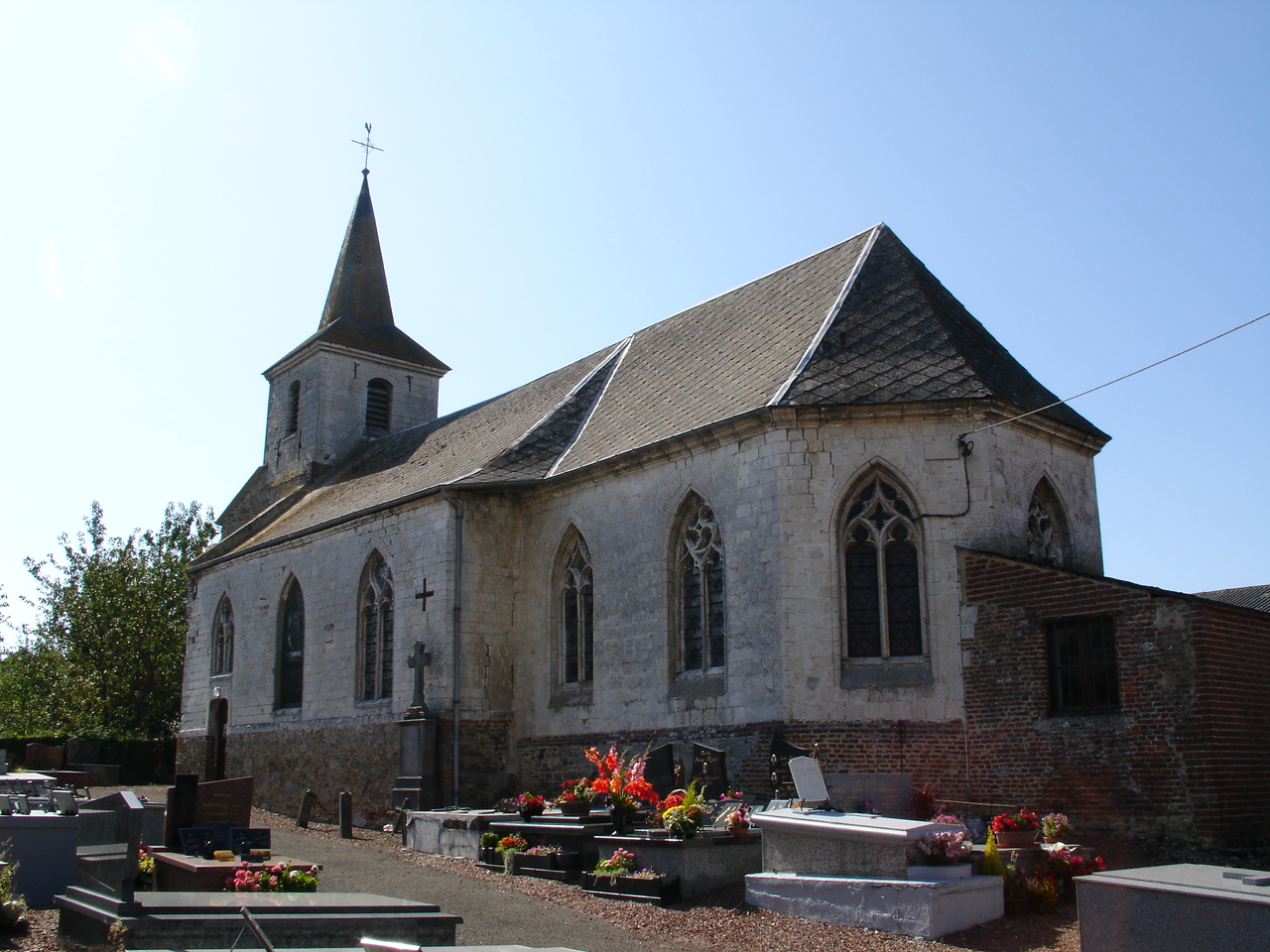
- The church of Mencas

- Coat of arms
- Location of Mencas
- Location within France Location within Hauts-de-France
- Coordinates: 50°33′37″N 2°08′23″E
- Country: France
- Region: Hauts-de-France
- Department: Pas-de-Calais
- Arrondissement: Montreuil
- Canton: Fruges
- Intercommunality: CC Haut Pays du Montreuillois

Government
  - Mayor (2020–2026): Christian Mille
- Area^{1}: 2.02 km^{2} (0.78 sq mi)
- Elevation: 73 m (240 ft)
- Highest elevation: 108 m (354 ft)
- Lowest elevation: 62 m (203 ft)
- Population (2023): 71
  - Density: 35/km^{2} (91/sq mi)
- Time zone: UTC+01:00 (CET)
  - Summer (DST): UTC+02:00 (CEST)
- INSEE/Postal code: 62565 /62310
- ^{1} French Land Register data, which excludes lakes, ponds, glaciers > 1 km^{2} (0.386 sq mi or 247 acres) and river estuaries.

Mencas is a commune in the Pas-de-Calais department in the Hauts-de-France region of France.

== Geography ==
Mencas is situated in the valley of the Lys river, 20 miles (32 km) northeast of Montreuil-sur-Mer, on the D133 road.

== Population ==
Historical population
Year	Pop.	±% p.a.
1968	98	—
1975	90	−1.21%
1982	92	+0.31%
1990	90	−0.27%
1999	81	−1.16%
2007	89	+1.18%
2012	72	−4.15%
2017	77	+1.35%
2023	71	−1.34%
Source: INSEE

== Places of interest ==
- The church of the Visitation.

== See also ==
- Communes of the Pas-de-Calais department
