= Zoteux =

Zoteux Teralteren
- Commune
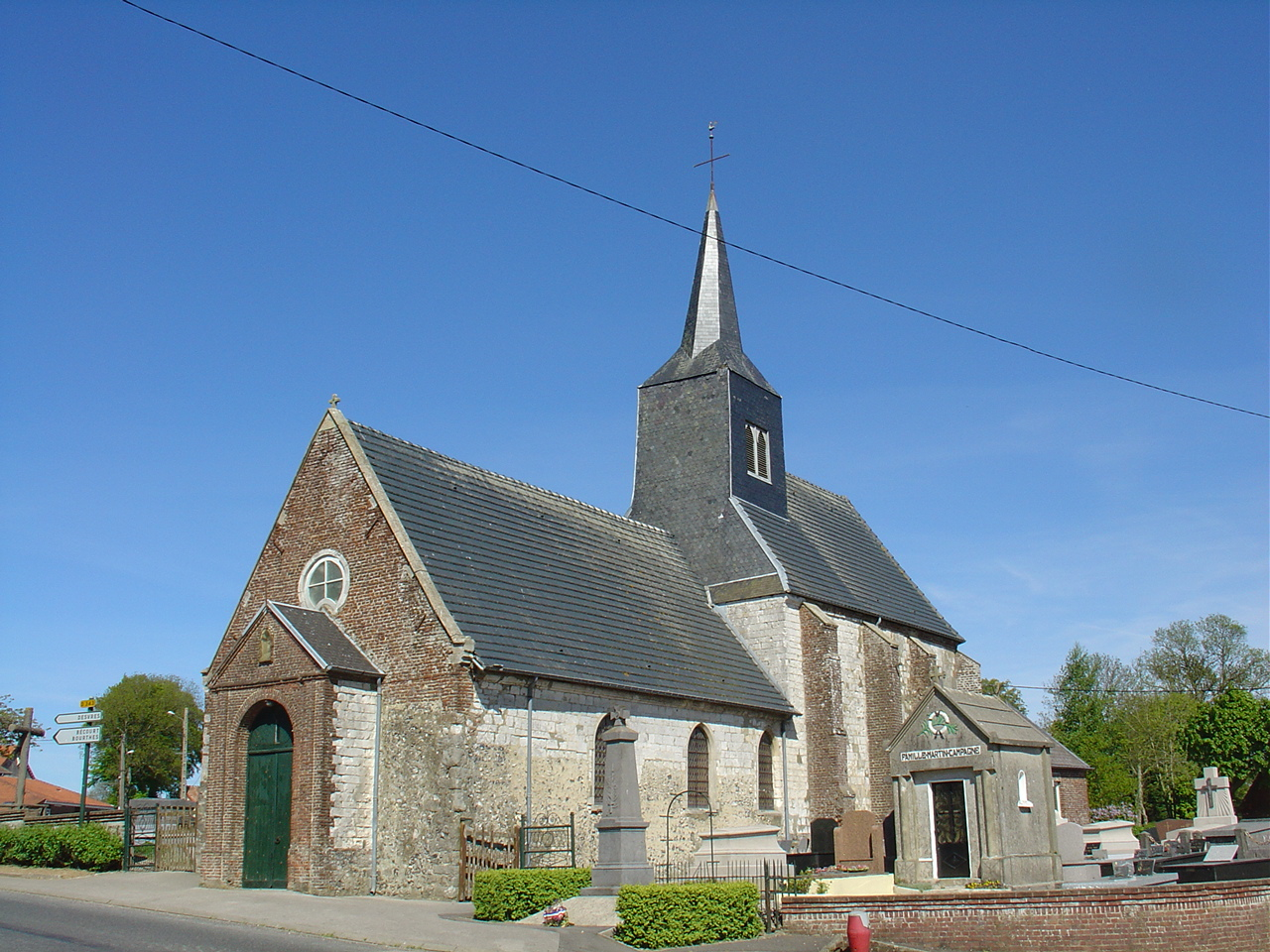
- The church of Zoteux
- Location of Zoteux
- Location within France Location within Hauts-de-France
- Coordinates: 50°36′41″N 1°52′50″E
- Country: France
- Region: Hauts-de-France
- Department: Pas-de-Calais
- Arrondissement: Montreuil
- Canton: Lumbres
- Intercommunality: Haut Pays du Montreuillois

Government
  - Mayor (2020–2026): Daniel Lance
- Area^{1}: 7.34 km^{2} (2.83 sq mi)
- Elevation: 157 m (515 ft)
- Highest elevation: 172 m (564 ft)
- Lowest elevation: 130 m (430 ft)
- Population (2023): 588
  - Density: 80.1/km^{2} (207/sq mi)
- Demonym(s): Zotelois, Zoteloises
- Time zone: UTC+01:00 (CET)
  - Summer (DST): UTC+02:00 (CEST)
- INSEE/Postal code: 62903 /62650
- ^{1} French Land Register data, which excludes lakes, ponds, glaciers > 1 km^{2} (0.386 sq mi or 247 acres) and river estuaries.

Zoteux (French pronunciation: [zɔtø]; West Flemish: Teralteren) is a commune in the Pas-de-Calais department in the Hauts-de-France region of France.

== Geography ==
Zoteux is located 16 miles (26 km) northeast of Montreuil-sur-Mer, on the D343 road.

== Population ==
Historical population

| Year | Pop. | ±% p.a. |
|---|---|---|
| 1793 | 462 | — |
| 1821 | 481 | +0.14% |
| 1846 | 408 | −0.66% |
| 1872 | 425 | +0.16% |
| 1901 | 446 | +0.17% |
| 1926 | 326 | −1.25% |
| 1946 | 309 | −0.27% |
| 1962 | 298 | −0.23% |
| 1968 | 299 | +0.06% |

| Year | Pop. | ±% p.a. |
|---|---|---|
| 1975 | 322 | +1.06% |
| 1982 | 390 | +2.77% |
| 1990 | 404 | +0.44% |
| 1999 | 390 | −0.39% |
| 2007 | 483 | +2.71% |
| 2012 | 558 | +2.93% |
| 2017 | 615 | +1.96% |
| 2023 | 588 | −0.75% |

Source: EHESS (1793-1999) and INSEE

== Places of interest ==
- The church of St. Pierre, dating from the fifteenth century.
- The Louis XVI château.

== See also ==
- Communes of the Pas-de-Calais department
