= Coupelle-Vieille =

- Commune
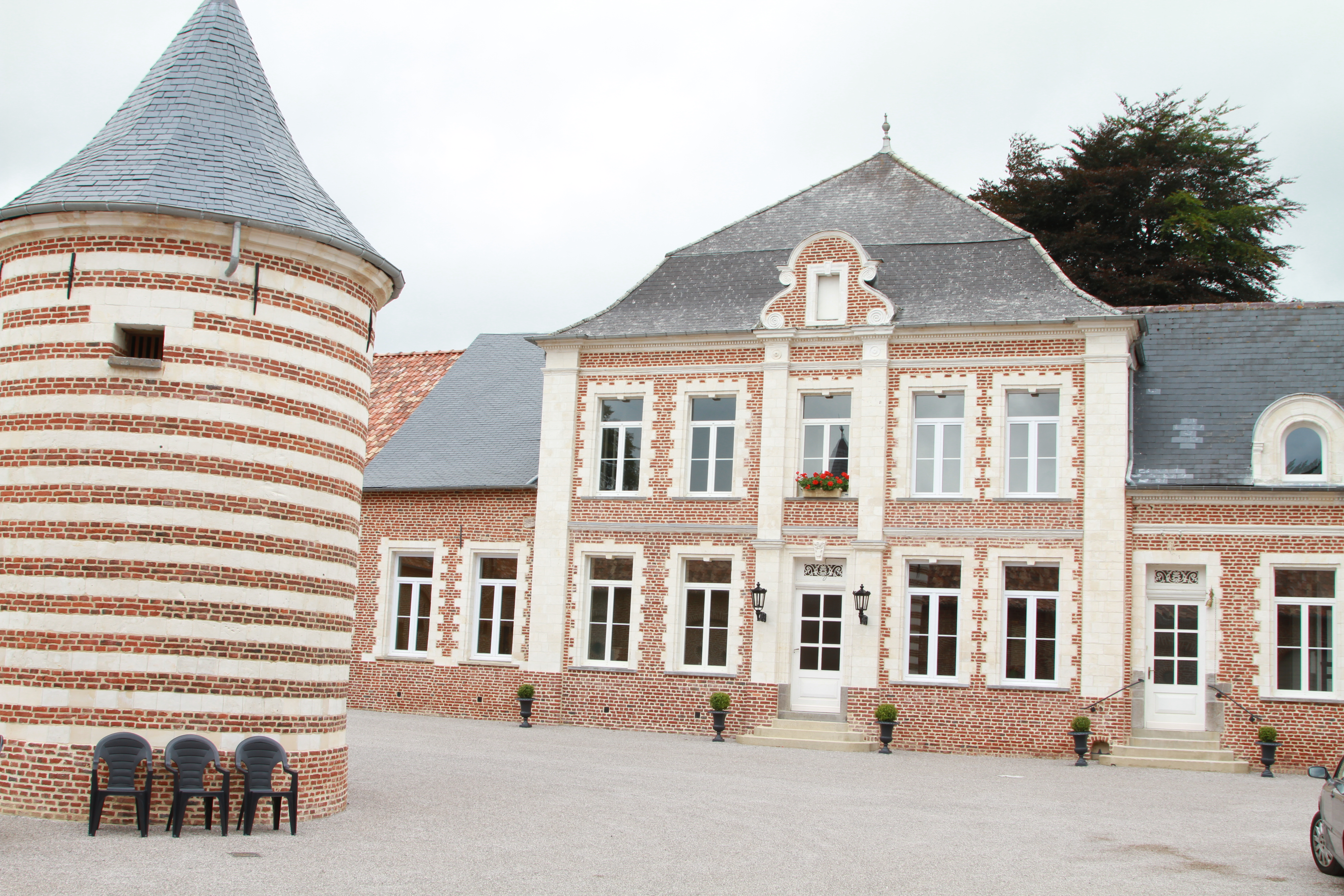
- The Domaine de la Traxene

- Coat of arms
- Location of Coupelle-Vieille
- Location within France Location within Hauts-de-France
- Coordinates: 50°31′31″N 2°06′02″E
- Country: France
- Region: Hauts-de-France
- Department: Pas-de-Calais
- Arrondissement: Montreuil
- Canton: Fruges
- Intercommunality: CC Haut Pays du Montreuillois

Government
  - Mayor (2020–2026): Christian Margez
- Area^{1}: 14.69 km^{2} (5.67 sq mi)
- Elevation: 107 m (351 ft)
- Highest elevation: 186 m (610 ft)
- Lowest elevation: 103 m (338 ft)
- Population (2023): 550
  - Density: 37/km^{2} (97/sq mi)
- Time zone: UTC+01:00 (CET)
  - Summer (DST): UTC+02:00 (CEST)
- INSEE/Postal code: 62247 /62310
- ^{1} French Land Register data, which excludes lakes, ponds, glaciers > 1 km^{2} (0.386 sq mi or 247 acres) and river estuaries.

Coupelle-Vieille (French pronunciation: [kupɛl vjɛj]) is a commune in the Pas-de-Calais department in the Hauts-de-France region of France.

== Geography ==
Coupelle-Vieille is situated some 16 miles (26 km) northeast of Montreuil-sur-Mer on the D343 road.

== Population ==
Historical population
Year	Pop.	±% p.a.
1968	522	—
1975	506	−0.44%
1982	478	−0.81%
1990	501	+0.59%
1999	494	−0.16%
2007	510	+0.40%
2012	598	+3.23%
2017	601	+0.10%
2023	550	−1.47%
Source: INSEE

== Transport ==
The Chemin de fer d'Anvin à Calais opened a railway station at Coupelle-Vielle in 1881. From 1891, the station was also served by the Chemins de fer d'Aire à Fruges et de Rimeux-Gournay à Berck. The railways were closed in 1955.

== See also ==
- Communes of the Pas-de-Calais department
