= Rimboval =

- Commune
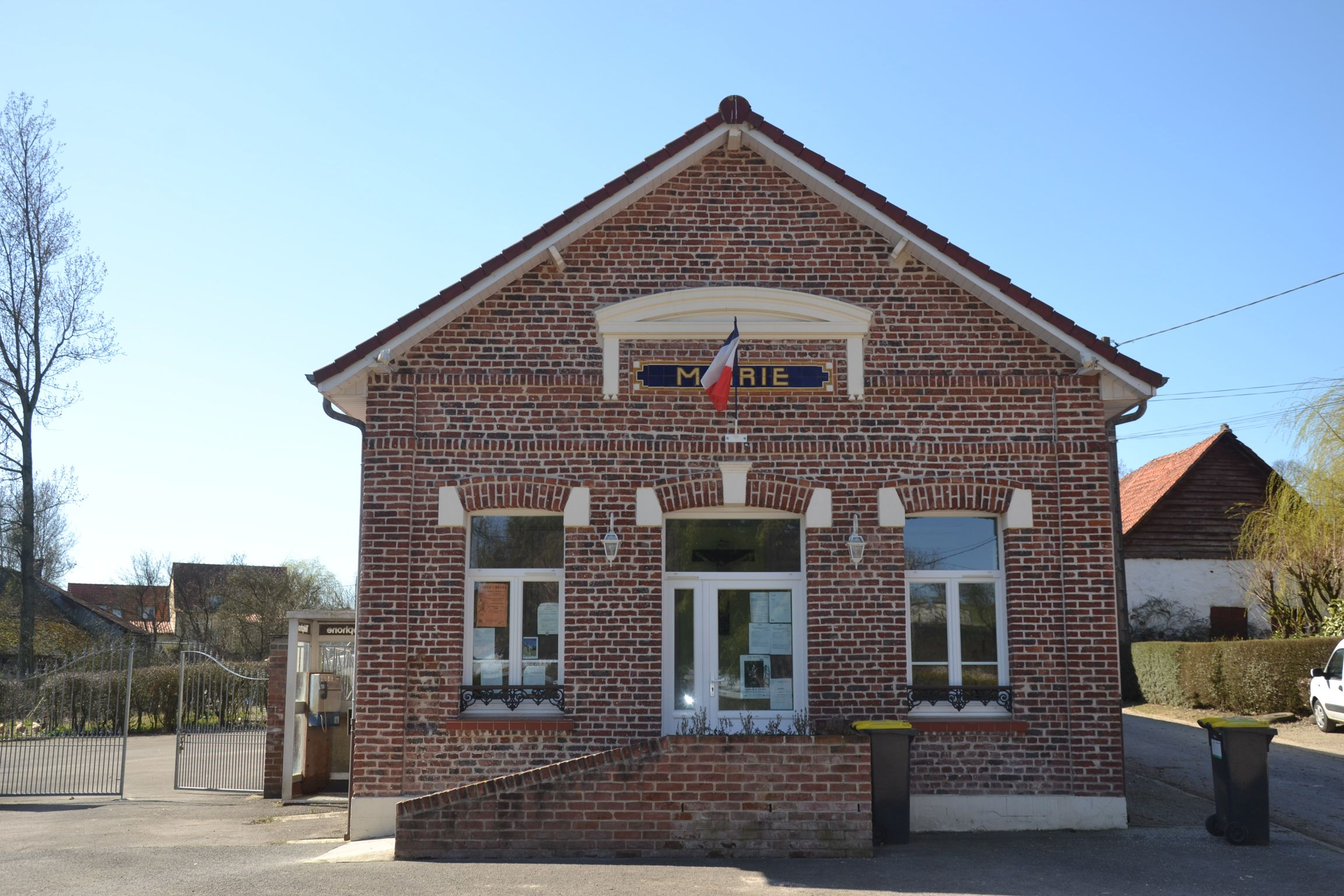
- The town hall of Rimboval

- Coat of arms
- Location of Rimboval
- Location within France Location within Hauts-de-France
- Coordinates: 50°30′30″N 1°59′12″E
- Country: France
- Region: Hauts-de-France
- Department: Pas-de-Calais
- Arrondissement: Montreuil
- Canton: Fruges
- Intercommunality: CC Haut Pays du Montreuillois

Government
  - Mayor (2020–2026): Nicolas Pichonnier
- Area^{1}: 7.07 km^{2} (2.73 sq mi)
- Elevation: 100 m (330 ft)
- Highest elevation: 197 m (646 ft)
- Lowest elevation: 87 m (285 ft)
- Population (2023): 185
  - Density: 26.2/km^{2} (67.8/sq mi)
- Time zone: UTC+01:00 (CET)
  - Summer (DST): UTC+02:00 (CEST)
- INSEE/Postal code: 62710 /62990
- ^{1} French Land Register data, which excludes lakes, ponds, glaciers > 1 km^{2} (0.386 sq mi or 247 acres) and river estuaries.

Rimboval (French pronunciation: [ʁɛ̃bɔval]; Picard: Rimbovau) is a commune in the Pas-de-Calais department in the Hauts-de-France region of France.

== Geography ==
Rimboval is located 10 miles (16 km) northeast of Montreuil-sur-Mer on the D149 road.

== Population ==
Historical population
Year	Pop.	±% p.a.
1968	187	—
1975	151	−3.01%
1982	161	+0.92%
1990	146	−1.22%
1999	124	−1.80%
2007	120	−0.41%
2012	153	+4.98%
2017	142	−1.48%
2023	185	+4.51%
Source: INSEE

== Places of interest ==
- The church of St. Omer, dating from the sixteenth century.
- A watermill

== See also ==
- Communes of the Pas-de-Calais department
