= Bezinghem =

- Commune
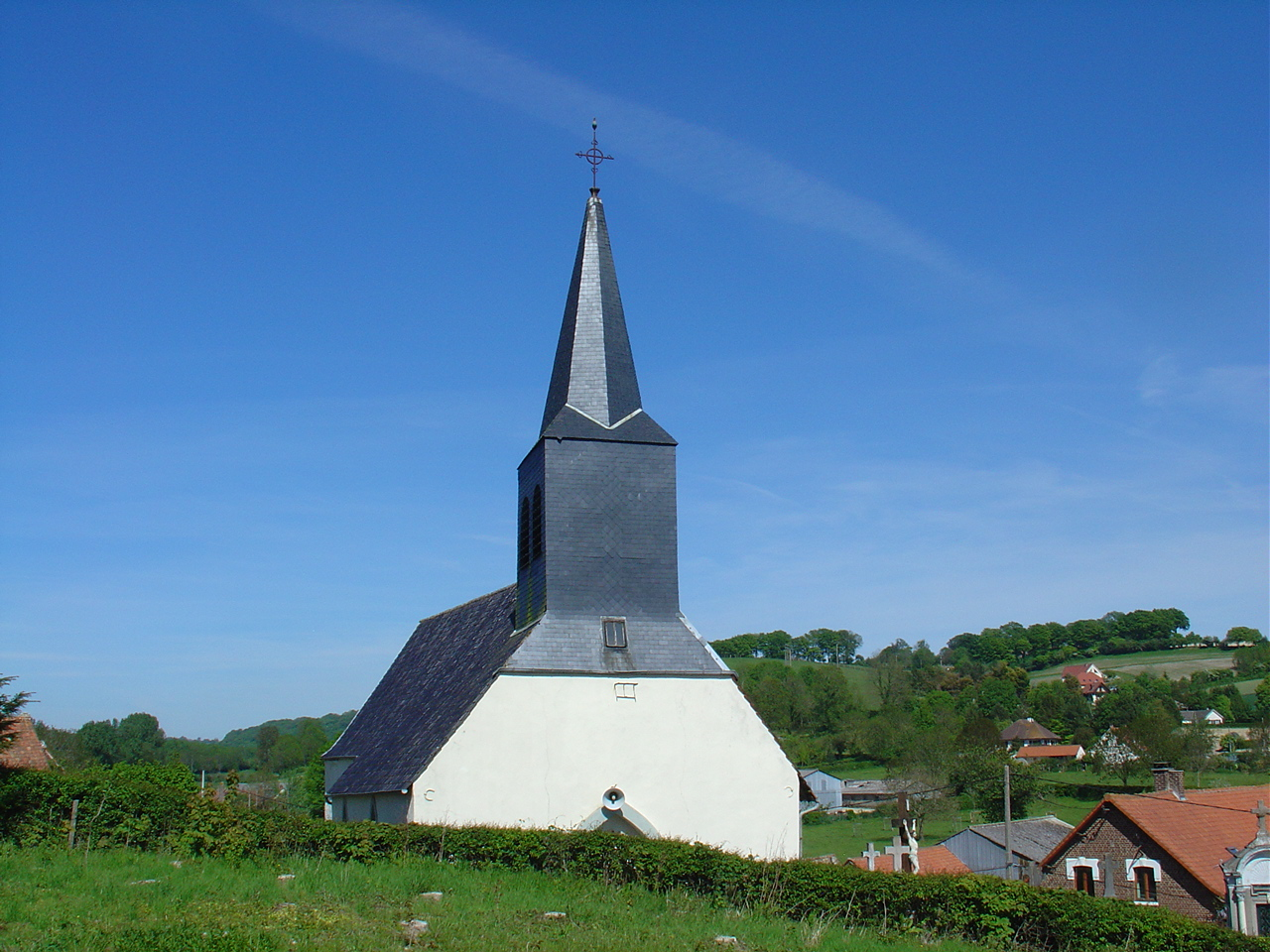
- The church of Bezinghem

- Coat of arms
- Location of Bezinghem
- Location within France Location within Hauts-de-France
- Coordinates: 50°35′42″N 1°49′37″E
- Country: France
- Region: Hauts-de-France
- Department: Pas-de-Calais
- Arrondissement: Montreuil
- Canton: Lumbres
- Intercommunality: CC Haut Pays du Montreuillois

Government
  - Mayor (2020–2026): Philippe Ducrocq
- Area^{1}: 13.15 km^{2} (5.08 sq mi)
- Elevation: 73 m (240 ft)
- Highest elevation: 176 m (577 ft)
- Lowest elevation: 50 m (160 ft)
- Population (2023): 367
  - Density: 27.9/km^{2} (72.3/sq mi)
- Time zone: UTC+01:00 (CET)
  - Summer (DST): UTC+02:00 (CEST)
- INSEE/Postal code: 62127 /62650
- ^{1} French Land Register data, which excludes lakes, ponds, glaciers > 1 km^{2} (0.386 sq mi or 247 acres) and river estuaries.

Bezinghem is a commune in the Pas-de-Calais department in the Hauts-de-France region of France.

== Geography ==
A small village situated some 15 miles(24 km) southeast of Boulogne-sur-Mer, on the D127E road.

== Population ==
Historical population
| Year | Pop. | ±% p.a. |
|---|---|---|
| 1968 | 284 | — |
| 1975 | 274 | −0.51% |
| 1982 | 273 | −0.05% |
| 1990 | 271 | −0.09% |
| 1999 | 294 | +0.91% |
| 2007 | 330 | +1.45% |
| 2012 | 377 | +2.70% |
| 2017 | 363 | −0.75% |
| 2023 | 367 | +0.18% |
Source: INSEE

== See also ==
- Communes of the Pas-de-Calais department
