= Campagne-lès-Boulonnais =

- Commune
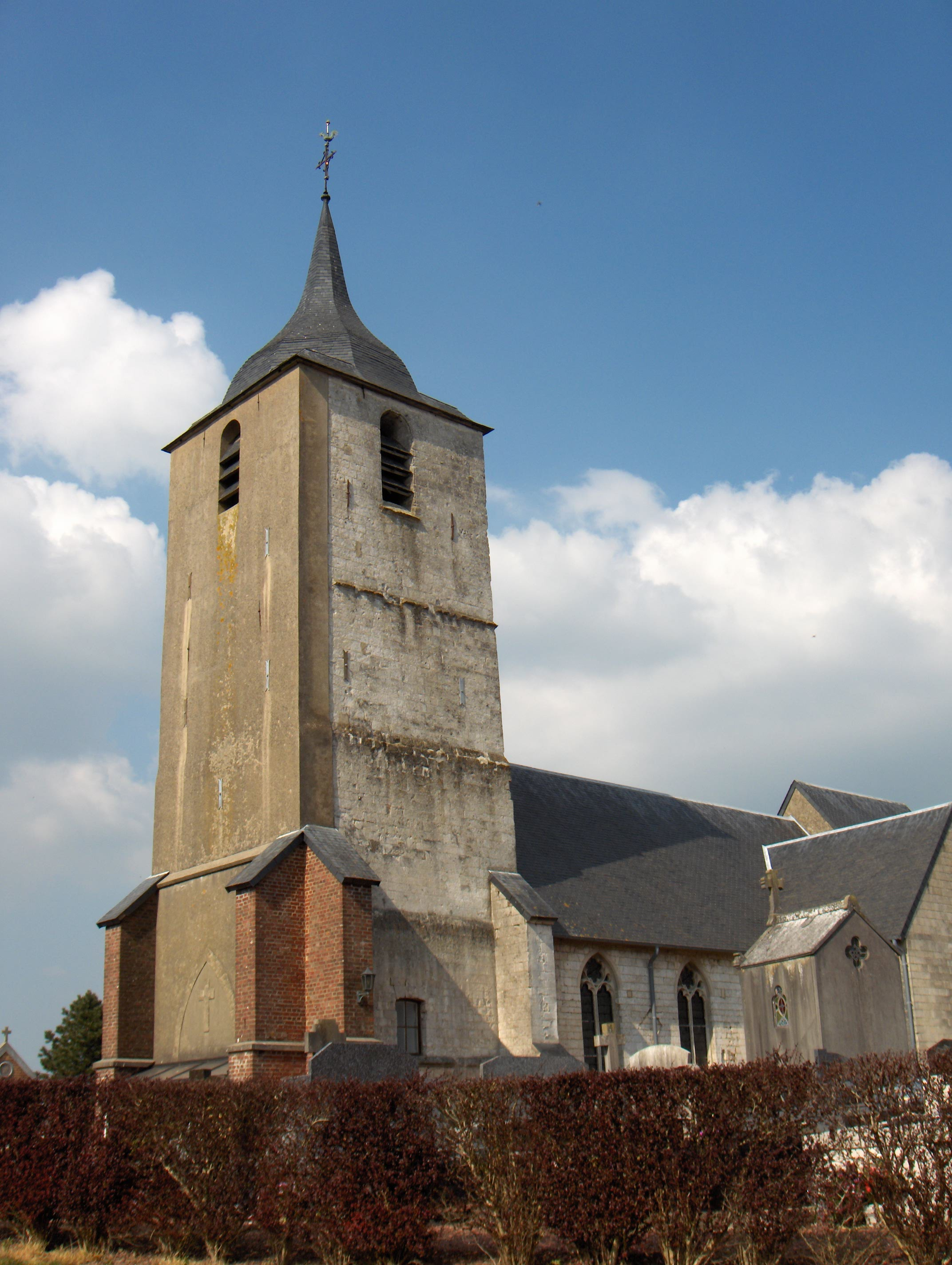
- The church of Campagne-lès-Boulonnais

- Coat of arms
- Location of Campagne-lès-Boulonnais
- Location within France Location within Hauts-de-France
- Coordinates: 50°36′48″N 1°59′54″E
- Country: France
- Region: Hauts-de-France
- Department: Pas-de-Calais
- Arrondissement: Montreuil
- Canton: Lumbres
- Intercommunality: CC Haut Pays du Montreuillois

Government
  - Mayor (2020–2026): Bernard Hibon
- Area^{1}: 13.28 km^{2} (5.13 sq mi)
- Elevation: 150 m (490 ft)
- Highest elevation: 179 m (587 ft)
- Lowest elevation: 113 m (371 ft)
- Population (2023): 669
  - Density: 50.4/km^{2} (130/sq mi)
- Time zone: UTC+01:00 (CET)
  - Summer (DST): UTC+02:00 (CEST)
- INSEE/Postal code: 62202 /62650
- ^{1} French Land Register data, which excludes lakes, ponds, glaciers > 1 km^{2} (0.386 sq mi or 247 acres) and river estuaries.

Campagne-lès-Boulonnais (French pronunciation: [kɑ̃paɲ lɛ bulɔnɛ]) is a commune in the Pas-de-Calais department in the Hauts-de-France region of France, about 16 miles (25 km) southeast of Boulogne-sur-Mer on the D92 road.

== Population ==
Historical population
Year	Pop.	±% p.a.
1968	573	—
1975	518	−1.43%
1982	501	−0.48%
1990	473	−0.72%
1999	453	−0.48%
2007	566	+2.82%
2012	593	+0.94%
2017	634	+1.35%
2023	669	+0.90%
Source: INSEE

== See also ==
- Communes of the Pas-de-Calais department
