= Quilen =

Quilen Killem
- Commune
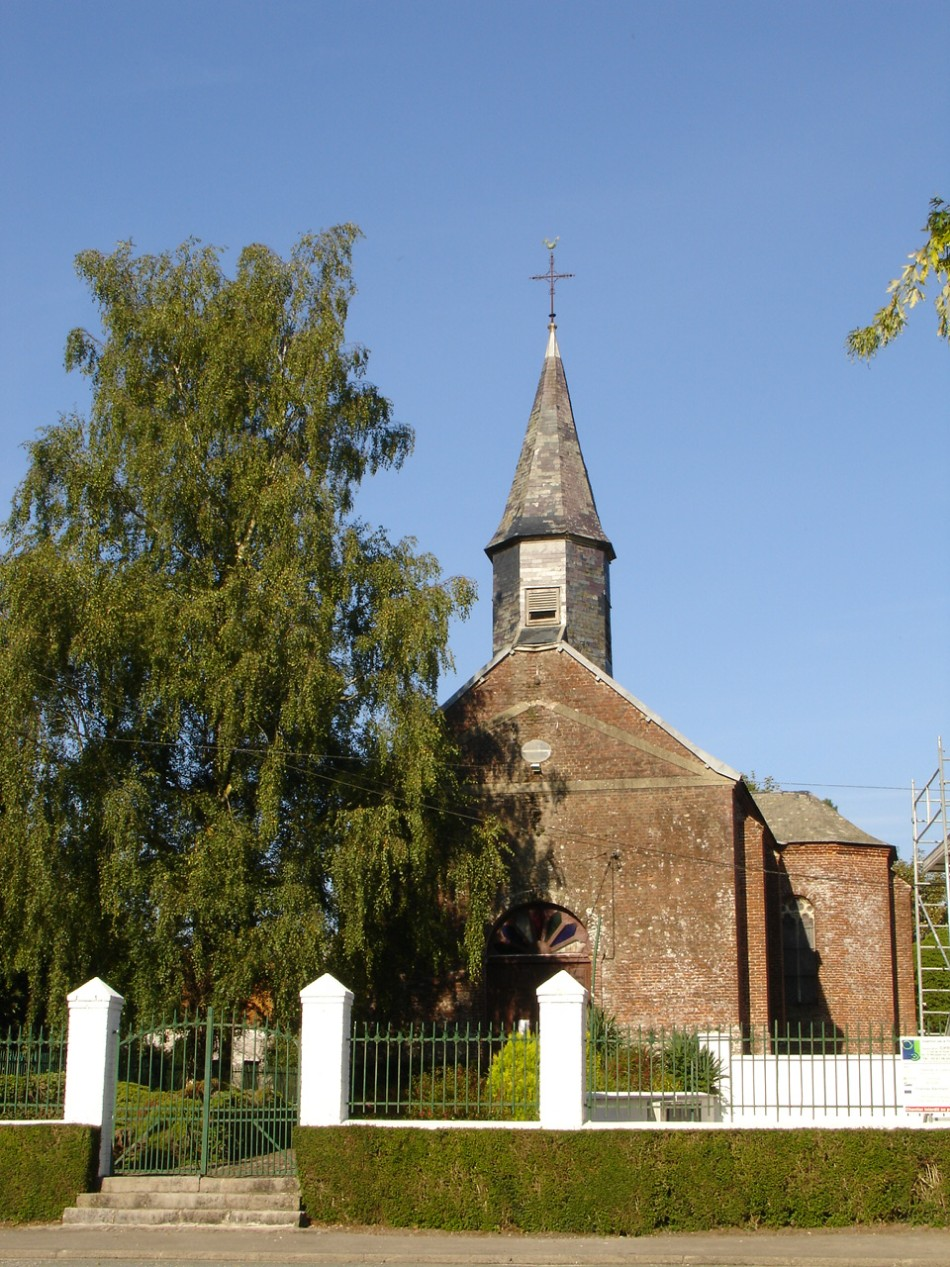
- The church of Quilen

- Coat of arms
- Location of Quilen
- Location within France Location within Hauts-de-France
- Coordinates: 50°31′49″N 1°55′43″E
- Country: France
- Region: Hauts-de-France
- Department: Pas-de-Calais
- Arrondissement: Montreuil
- Canton: Lumbres
- Intercommunality: CC Haut Pays du Montreuillois

Government
  - Mayor (2020–2026): Pascal Caron
- Area^{1}: 4.06 km^{2} (1.57 sq mi)
- Elevation: 115 m (377 ft)
- Highest elevation: 192 m (630 ft)
- Lowest elevation: 86 m (282 ft)
- Population (2023): 64
  - Density: 16/km^{2} (41/sq mi)
- Time zone: UTC+01:00 (CET)
  - Summer (DST): UTC+02:00 (CEST)
- INSEE/Postal code: 62682 /62650
- ^{1} French Land Register data, which excludes lakes, ponds, glaciers > 1 km^{2} (0.386 sq mi or 247 acres) and river estuaries.

Quilen (French pronunciation: [kilɑ̃]; West Flemish: Killem) is a commune in the Pas-de-Calais department in the Hauts-de-France region of France.

== Geography ==
Quilen lies 10 miles (16 km) northeast of Montreuil-sur-Mer on the D129E1 road. There's a pond on the village square.

== Population ==
Historical population
Year	Pop.	±% p.a.
1968	69	—
1975	82	+2.50%
1982	74	−1.46%
1990	62	−2.19%
1999	61	−0.18%
2007	62	+0.20%
2012	59	−0.99%
2017	60	+0.34%
2023	64	+1.08%
Source: INSEE

== Places of interest ==
- The eighteenth-century château (private).
- The church of St.Pierre, dating from the seventeenth century.

== See also ==
- Communes of the Pas-de-Calais department
