= Vincly =

- Commune
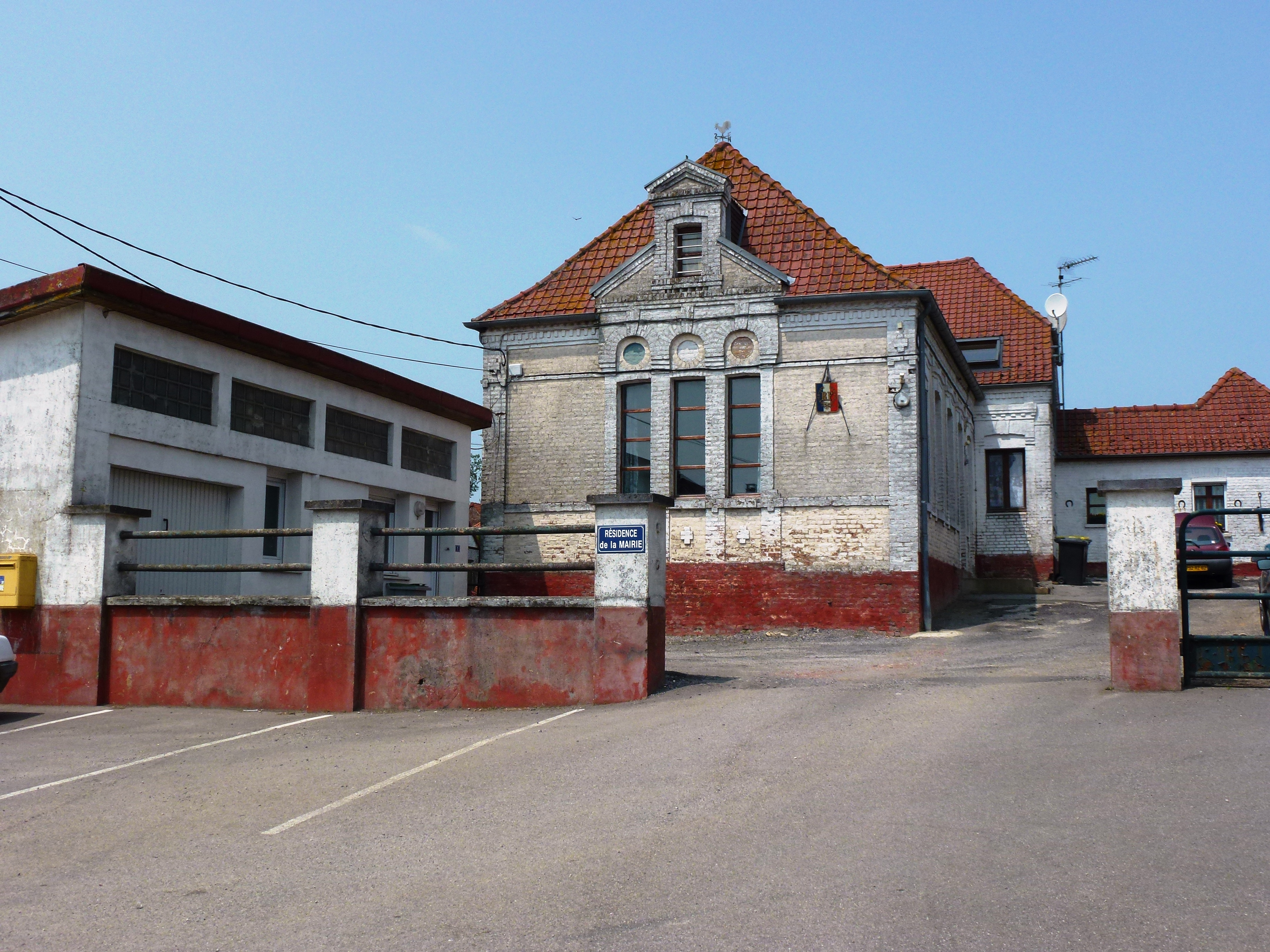
- The town hall of Vincly

- Coat of arms
- Location of Vincly
- Location within France Location within Hauts-de-France
- Coordinates: 50°33′33″N 2°10′18″E
- Country: France
- Region: Hauts-de-France
- Department: Pas-de-Calais
- Arrondissement: Montreuil
- Canton: Fruges
- Intercommunality: CC Haut Pays du Montreuillois

Government
  - Mayor (2020–2026): Gilles Henneguelle
- Area^{1}: 4.6 km^{2} (1.8 sq mi)
- Elevation: 100 m (330 ft)
- Highest elevation: 184 m (604 ft)
- Lowest elevation: 68 m (223 ft)
- Population (2023): 146
  - Density: 32/km^{2} (82/sq mi)
- Time zone: UTC+01:00 (CET)
  - Summer (DST): UTC+02:00 (CEST)
- INSEE/Postal code: 62862 /62310
- ^{1} French Land Register data, which excludes lakes, ponds, glaciers > 1 km^{2} (0.386 sq mi or 247 acres) and river estuaries.

Vincly (French pronunciation: [vɛ̃kli]) is a commune in the Pas-de-Calais department in the Hauts-de-France region of France 21 miles (33 km) northeast of Montreuil-sur-Mer.

== Population ==
Historical population
Year	Pop.	±% p.a.
1968	176	—
1975	146	−2.63%
1982	142	−0.40%
1990	141	−0.09%
1999	121	−1.69%
2007	149	+2.64%
2012	159	+1.31%
2017	158	−0.13%
2023	146	−1.31%
Source: INSEE

== See also ==
- Communes of the Pas-de-Calais department
