= Beussent =

- Commune
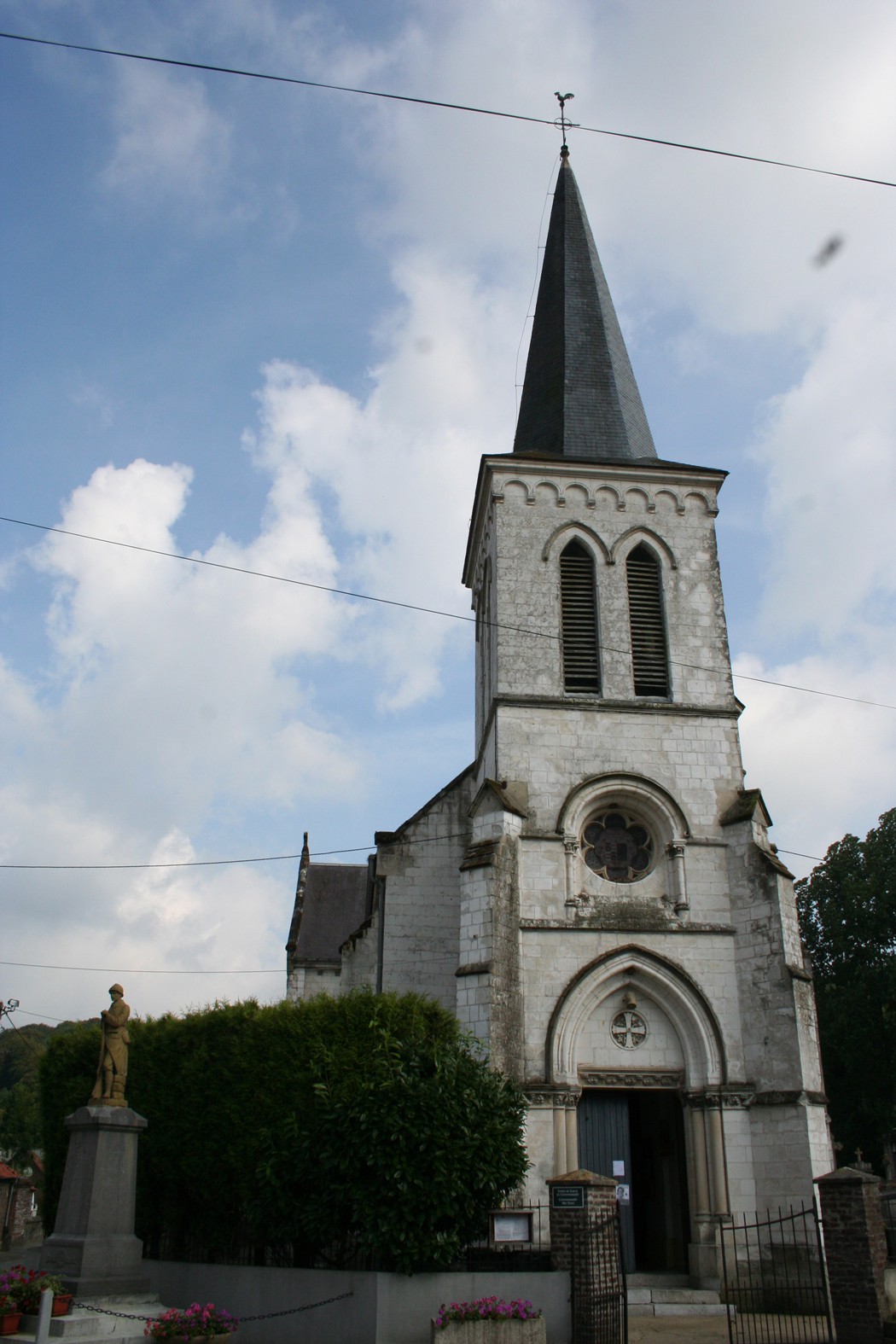
- The church of Beussent

- Coat of arms
- Location of Beussent
- Location within France Location within Hauts-de-France
- Coordinates: 50°32′50″N 1°47′35″E
- Country: France
- Region: Hauts-de-France
- Department: Pas-de-Calais
- Arrondissement: Montreuil
- Canton: Lumbres
- Intercommunality: CC Haut Pays du Montreuillois

Government
  - Mayor (2020–2026): Samuel Guerville
- Area^{1}: 15.93 km^{2} (6.15 sq mi)
- Elevation: 32 m (105 ft)
- Highest elevation: 151 m (495 ft)
- Lowest elevation: 26 m (85 ft)
- Population (2023): 546
  - Density: 34.3/km^{2} (88.8/sq mi)
- Time zone: UTC+01:00 (CET)
  - Summer (DST): UTC+02:00 (CEST)
- INSEE/Postal code: 62123 /62170
- ^{1} French Land Register data, which excludes lakes, ponds, glaciers > 1 km^{2} (0.386 sq mi or 247 acres) and river estuaries.

Beussent (French pronunciation: [bøsɑ̃]) is a commune in the Pas-de-Calais department in the Hauts-de-France region in northern France.

== Geography ==
A small village situated some 7 miles(11 km) north of Montreuil-sur-Mer, on the D127 road.

== Population ==
Historical population
Year	Pop.	±% p.a.
1968	455	—
1975	421	−1.10%
1982	413	−0.27%
1990	450	+1.08%
1999	411	−1.00%
2007	479	+1.93%
2012	526	+1.89%
2017	548	+0.82%
2023	546	−0.06%
Source: INSEE

== See also ==
- Communes of the Pas-de-Calais department
