= Bimont =

- Commune
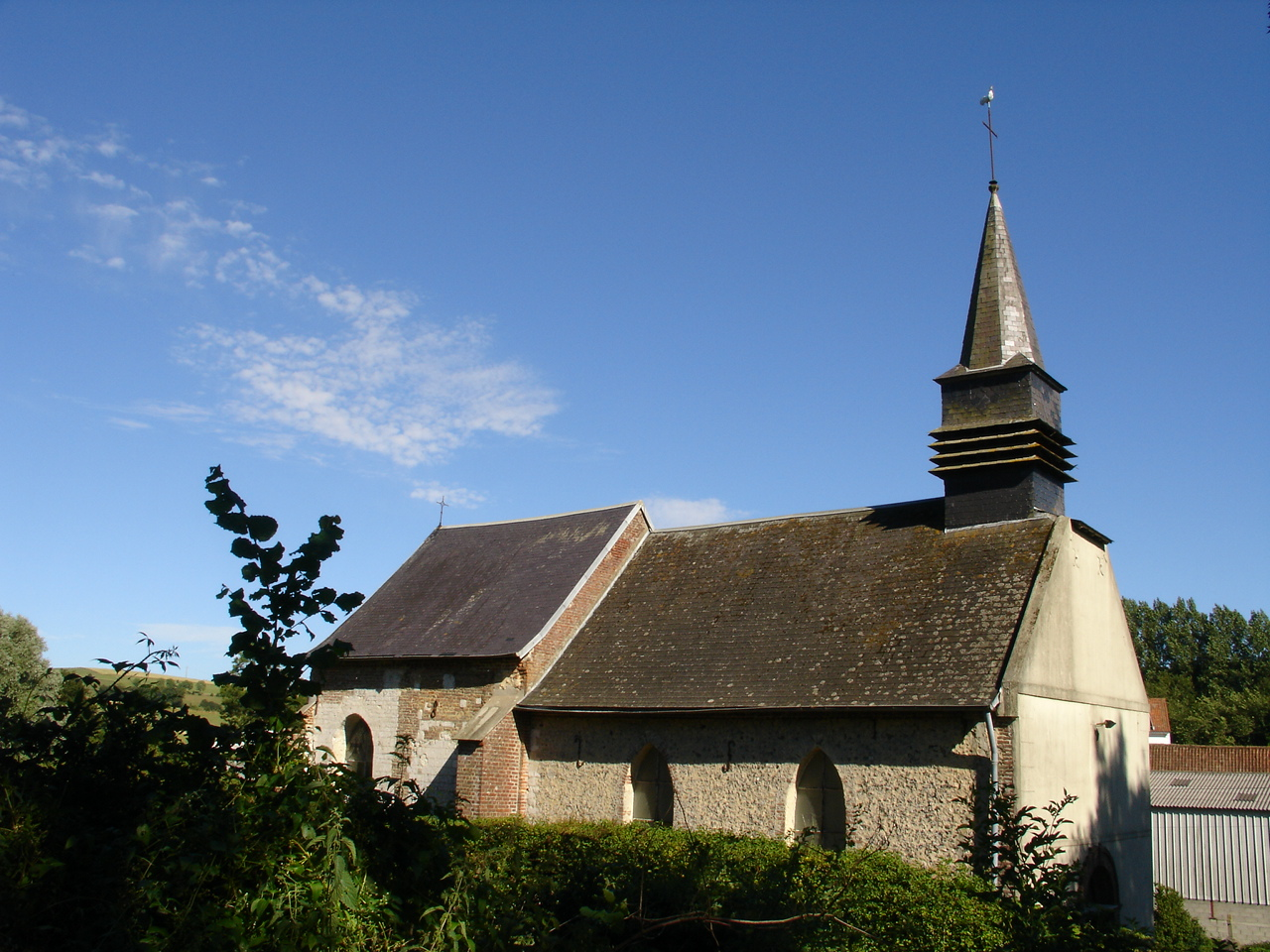
- The Church of Saint Peter

- Coat of arms
- Location of Bimont
- Location within France Location within Hauts-de-France
- Coordinates: 50°32′35″N 1°54′15″E
- Country: France
- Region: Hauts-de-France
- Department: Pas-de-Calais
- Arrondissement: Montreuil
- Canton: Lumbres
- Intercommunality: CC Haut Pays du Montreuillois

Government
  - Mayor (2020–2026): Jean-Marie Merlin
- Area^{1}: 6.81 km^{2} (2.63 sq mi)
- Elevation: 97 m (318 ft)
- Highest elevation: 184 m (604 ft)
- Lowest elevation: 89 m (292 ft)
- Population (2023): 112
  - Density: 16.4/km^{2} (42.6/sq mi)
- Time zone: UTC+01:00 (CET)
  - Summer (DST): UTC+02:00 (CEST)
- INSEE/Postal code: 62134 /62650
- ^{1} French Land Register data, which excludes lakes, ponds, glaciers > 1 km^{2} (0.386 sq mi or 247 acres) and river estuaries.

Bimont (French pronunciation: [bimɔ̃]) is a commune in the Pas-de-Calais department in the Hauts-de-France region in northern France.

== Geography ==
Bimont is a small village situated some 8 miles(13 km) northeast of Montreuil-sur-Mer, on the D152 road.

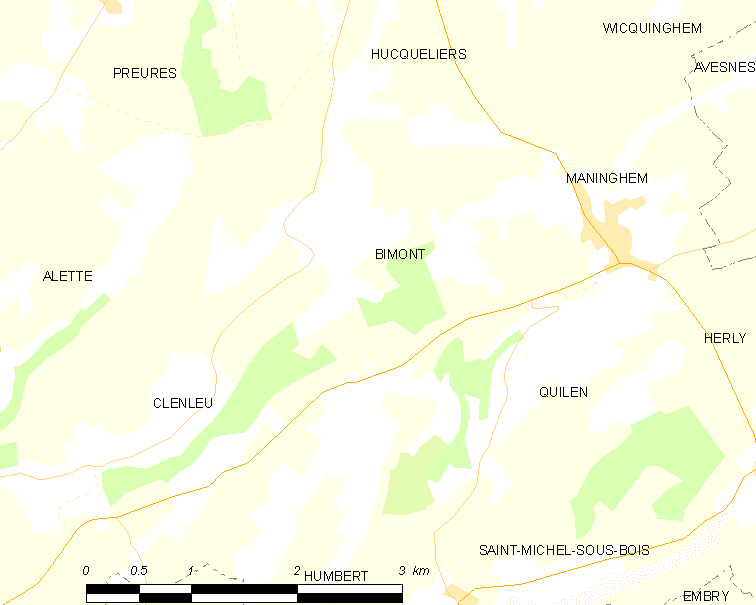
A map of the commune

== Population ==
Historical population
Year	Pop.	±% p.a.
1968	120	—
1975	117	−0.36%
1982	106	−1.40%
1990	108	+0.23%
1999	117	+0.89%
2007	123	+0.63%
2012	125	+0.32%
2017	114	−1.83%
2023	112	−0.29%
Source: INSEE

== See also ==
- Communes of the Pas-de-Calais department
