= Verchin =

- Commune
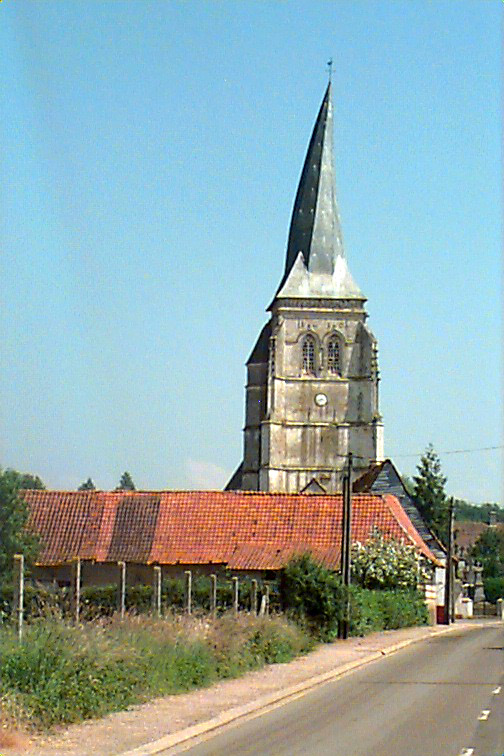
- The church of Verchin

- Coat of arms
- Location of Verchin
- Location within France Location within Hauts-de-France
- Coordinates: 50°29′43″N 2°11′07″E
- Country: France
- Region: Hauts-de-France
- Department: Pas-de-Calais
- Arrondissement: Montreuil
- Canton: Fruges
- Intercommunality: CC Haut Pays du Montreuillois

Government
  - Mayor (2020–2026): Florence Pruvost
- Area^{1}: 10.68 km^{2} (4.12 sq mi)
- Elevation: 102 m (335 ft)
- Highest elevation: 171 m (561 ft)
- Lowest elevation: 88 m (289 ft)
- Population (2023): 235
  - Density: 22.0/km^{2} (57.0/sq mi)
- Time zone: UTC+01:00 (CET)
  - Summer (DST): UTC+02:00 (CEST)
- INSEE/Postal code: 62843 /62310
- ^{1} French Land Register data, which excludes lakes, ponds, glaciers > 1 km^{2} (0.386 sq mi or 247 acres) and river estuaries.

Verchin (French pronunciation: [vɛʁʃɛ̃]) is a commune in the Pas-de-Calais department in the Hauts-de-France region of France 20 miles (32 km) east of Montreuil-sur-Mer.

== Population ==
The inhabitants are called Verchinois in French.

Historical population
| Year | Pop. | ±% p.a. |
|---|---|---|
| 1968 | 303 | — |
| 1975 | 276 | −1.32% |
| 1982 | 250 | −1.40% |
| 1990 | 220 | −1.59% |
| 1999 | 220 | +0.00% |
| 2007 | 199 | −1.25% |
| 2012 | 233 | +3.20% |
| 2017 | 241 | +0.68% |
| 2023 | 235 | −0.42% |
Source: INSEE

== Transport ==
The Chemin de fer d'Anvin à Calais opened a railway station at Verchin in 1881. The railway was closed in 1952.

== See also ==
- Communes of the Pas-de-Calais department
