= Parenty =

- Commune
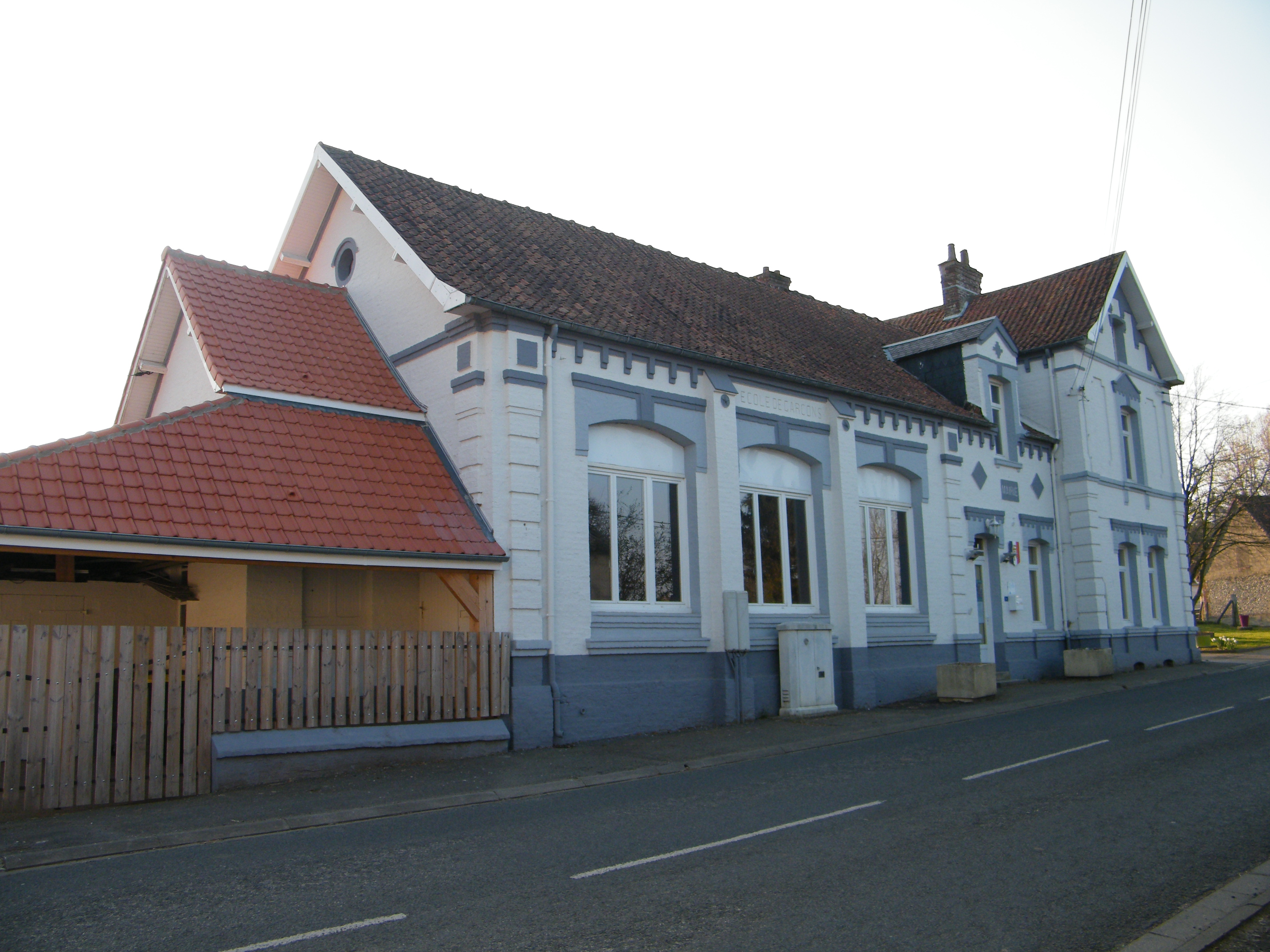
- The town hall and school of Parenty

- Coat of arms
- Location of Parenty
- Location within France Location within Hauts-de-France
- Coordinates: 50°35′19″N 1°48′36″E
- Country: France
- Region: Hauts-de-France
- Department: Pas-de-Calais
- Arrondissement: Montreuil
- Canton: Lumbres
- Intercommunality: CC Haut Pays du Montreuillois

Government
  - Mayor (2020–2026): Serge Depraiter
- Area^{1}: 12.92 km^{2} (4.99 sq mi)
- Elevation: 77 m (253 ft)
- Highest elevation: 194 m (636 ft)
- Lowest elevation: 50 m (160 ft)
- Population (2023): 559
  - Density: 43.3/km^{2} (112/sq mi)
- Time zone: UTC+01:00 (CET)
  - Summer (DST): UTC+02:00 (CEST)
- INSEE/Postal code: 62648 /62650
- ^{1} French Land Register data, which excludes lakes, ponds, glaciers > 1 km^{2} (0.386 sq mi or 247 acres) and river estuaries.

Parenty (French pronunciation: [paʁɑ̃ti]) is a commune in the Pas-de-Calais department in the Hauts-de-France region of France about 10 miles (16 km) north of Montreuil-sur-Mer.

== Population ==
Historical population
Year	Pop.	±% p.a.
1968	406	—
1975	378	−1.02%
1982	369	−0.34%
1990	349	−0.69%
1999	396	+1.41%
2007	417	+0.65%
2012	528	+4.83%
2017	520	−0.30%
2023	559	+1.21%
Source: INSEE

== See also ==
- Communes of the Pas-de-Calais department
