= Hucqueliers =

Hucqueliers Hukkelaar
- Commune
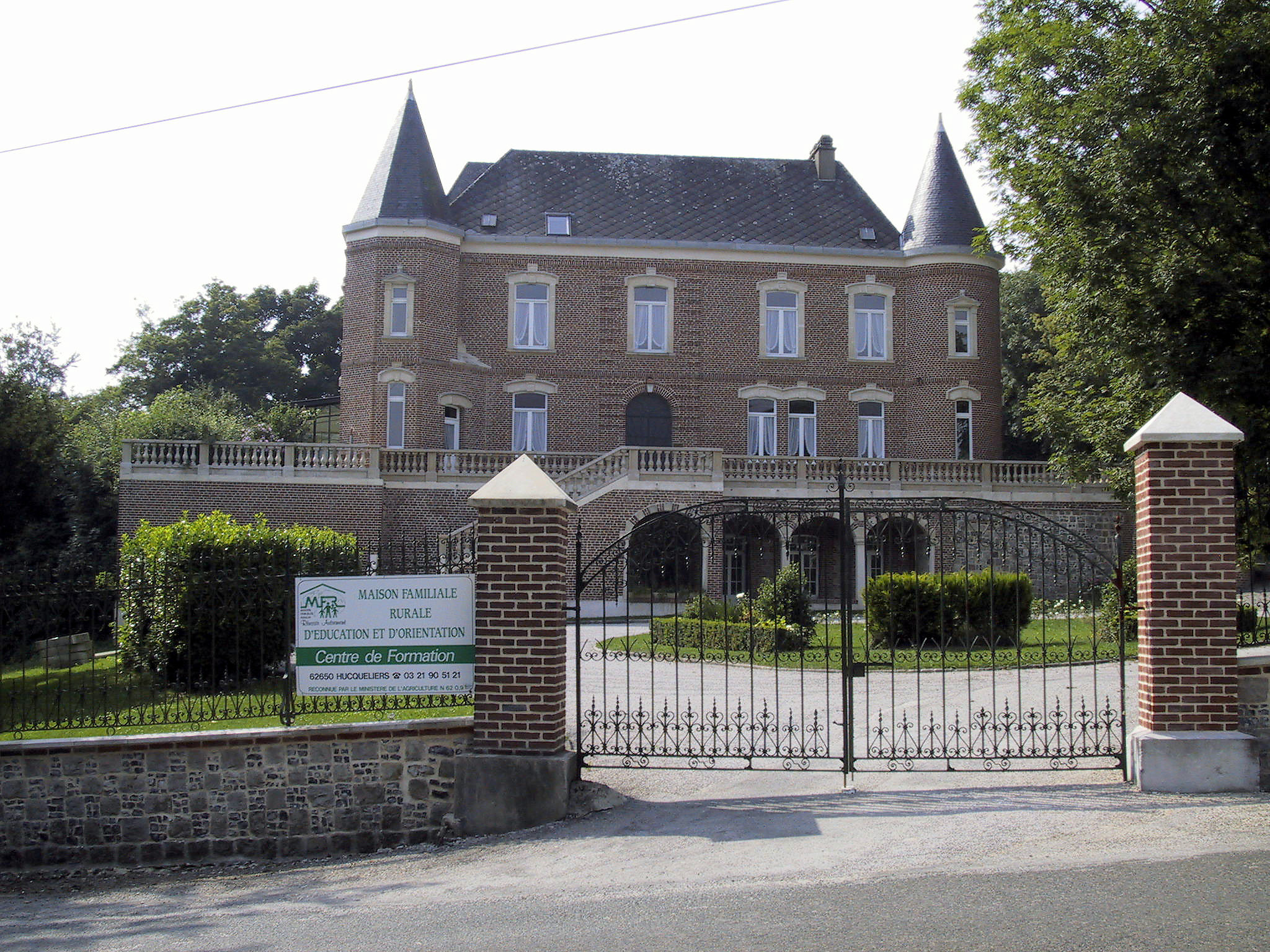
- Château

- Coat of arms
- Location of Hucqueliers
- Location within France Location within Hauts-de-France
- Coordinates: 50°34′10″N 1°54′26″E
- Country: France
- Region: Hauts-de-France
- Department: Pas-de-Calais
- Arrondissement: Montreuil
- Canton: Lumbres
- Intercommunality: CC Haut Pays du Montreuillois

Government
  - Mayor (2020–2026): Stephane Leleu
- Area^{1}: 7.62 km^{2} (2.94 sq mi)
- Elevation: 94 m (308 ft)
- Highest elevation: 172 m (564 ft)
- Lowest elevation: 92 m (302 ft)
- Population (2023): 494
  - Density: 64.8/km^{2} (168/sq mi)
- Time zone: UTC+01:00 (CET)
  - Summer (DST): UTC+02:00 (CEST)
- INSEE/Postal code: 62463 /62650
- ^{1} French Land Register data, which excludes lakes, ponds, glaciers > 1 km^{2} (0.386 sq mi or 247 acres) and river estuaries.

Hucqueliers (French pronunciation: [ykəlje]; West Flemish: Hukkelaar) is a commune in the department of Pas-de-Calais, in the northern French region of Hauts-de-France.

== Geography ==
Situated some 10 miles (16 km) northeast of Montreuil-sur-Mer at the D148 and D128 crossroads.

== Population ==
Historical population
Year	Pop.	±% p.a.
1968	555	—
1975	558	+0.08%
1982	528	−0.79%
1990	539	+0.26%
1999	505	−0.72%
2007	533	+0.68%
2012	517	−0.61%
2017	464	−2.14%
2023	494	+1.05%
Source: INSEE

== History ==
An important castle was built here in 1231 by the Count of Boulogne. Hucqueliers was the centre of resistance during the Lustucru revolt in 1662.

== Places of interest ==
- The chateau, now an educational establishment.
- The church of St. André, dating from the fifteenth century.
- The eighteenth century Manoir de la Longeville.

== See also ==
- Communes of the Pas-de-Calais department
