= Herly, Pas-de-Calais =

Herly
- Commune
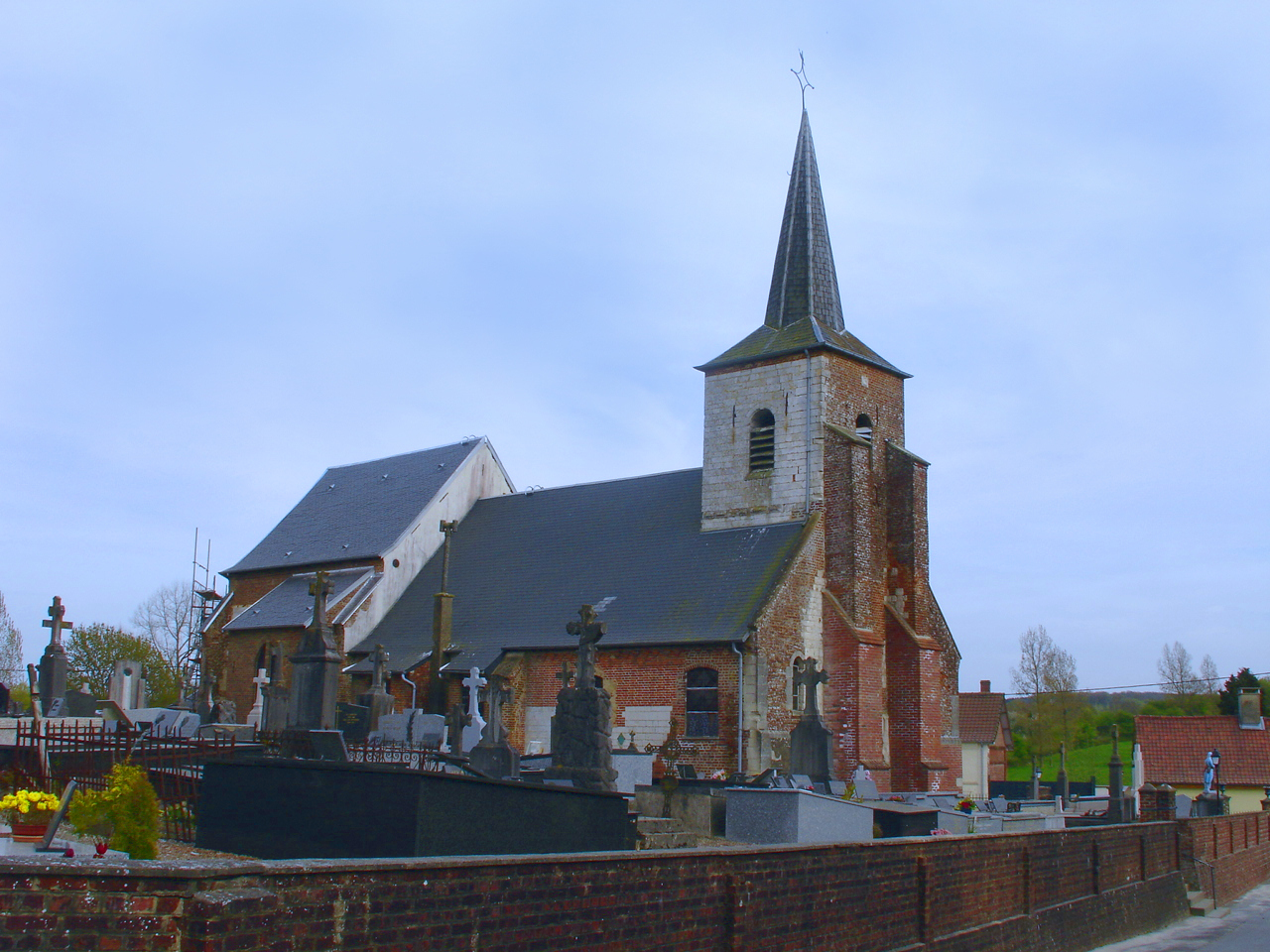
- The church of Herly

- Coat of arms
- Location of Herly
- Location within France Location within Hauts-de-France
- Coordinates: 50°33′10″N 1°59′09″E
- Country: France
- Region: Hauts-de-France
- Department: Pas-de-Calais
- Arrondissement: Montreuil
- Canton: Lumbres
- Intercommunality: CC Haut Pays du Montreuillois

Government
  - Mayor (2020–2026): Alain Peron
- Area^{1}: 16.3 km^{2} (6.3 sq mi)
- Elevation: 136 m (446 ft)
- Highest elevation: 199 m (653 ft)
- Lowest elevation: 110 m (360 ft)
- Population (2023): 330
  - Density: 20/km^{2} (52/sq mi)
- Time zone: UTC+01:00 (CET)
  - Summer (DST): UTC+02:00 (CEST)
- INSEE/Postal code: 62437 /62650
- ^{1} French Land Register data, which excludes lakes, ponds, glaciers > 1 km^{2} (0.386 sq mi or 247 acres) and river estuaries.

Herly (French pronunciation: [ɛʁli]) is a commune in the Pas-de-Calais department in the Hauts-de-France region of France.

== Geography ==
A village situated some 14 miles (22 km) northeast of Montreuil-sur-Mer on the D156 road.

== Population ==
Historical population
Year	Pop.	±% p.a.
1968	407	—
1975	404	−0.11%
1982	413	+0.32%
1990	326	−2.91%
1999	323	−0.10%
2007	324	+0.04%
2012	335	+0.67%
2017	313	−1.35%
2023	330	+0.89%
Source: INSEE

== Places of interest ==
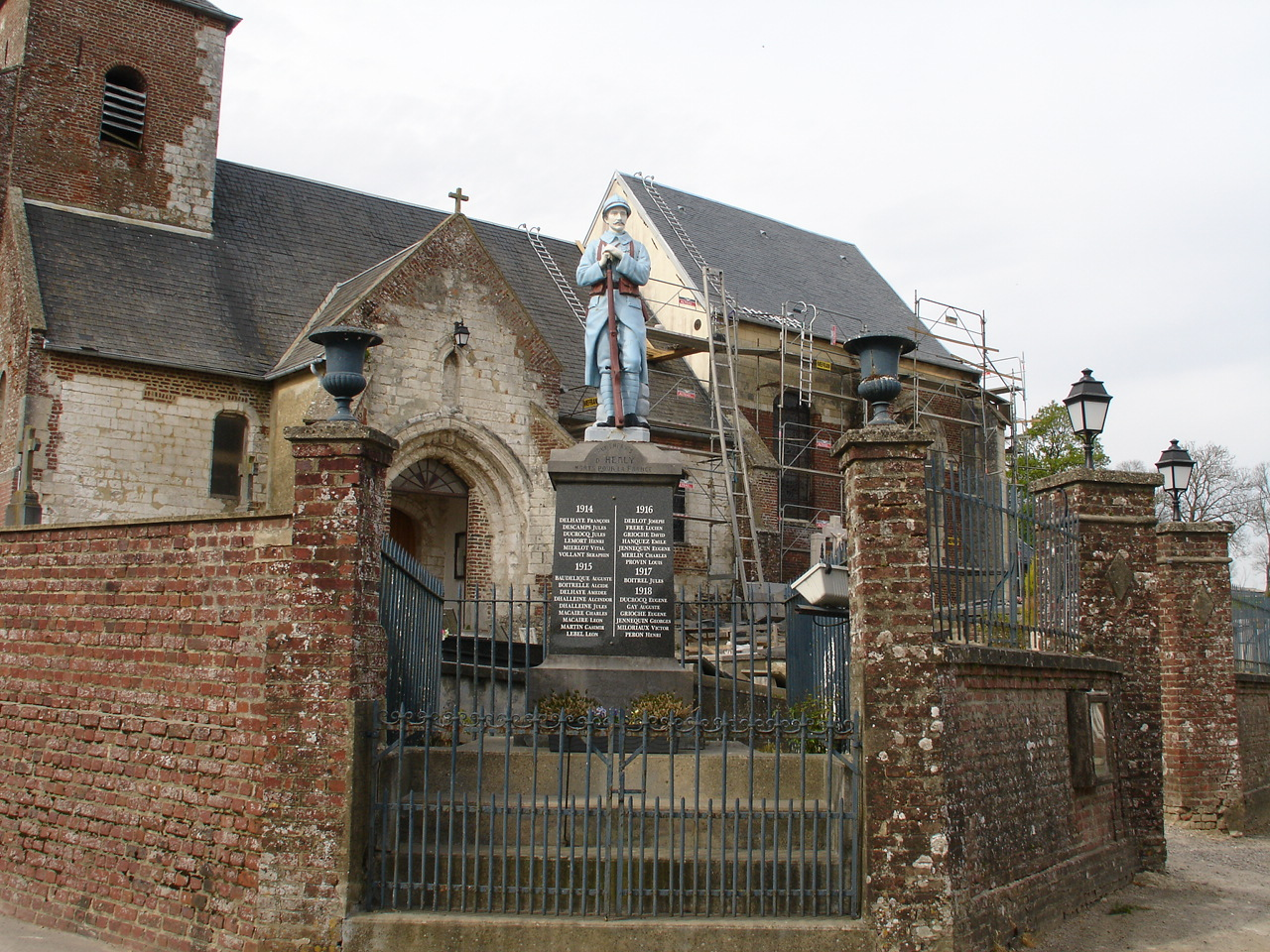
The war memorial in front of the Church of St. Peter.

- The church of St. Peter, dating from the seventeenth century.
- The seventeenth century priory and chapel

== See also ==
- Communes of the Pas-de-Calais department
