= Communauté de communes du Montreuillois =

Coordinates: 50.4641°N 1.7631°E

Montreuillois
- Former communauté de communes
- Interactive map of Montreuillois
- Country: France
- Region: Hauts-de-France
- Department: Pas-de-Calais
- No. of communes: {{{nbcomm}}}
- Established: 2002
- Disbanded: 2017
- Population (1999): 10,331

The communauté de communes du Montreuillois was created on July 12, 1999, and was located in the Pas-de-Calais département, in northern France. It was created in January 2002. It was merged into the new Communauté d'agglomération des Deux Baies en Montreuillois in January 2017.

The Communauté de communes comprised the following communes:

1. Attin
2. Beaumerie-Saint-Martin
3. Bernieulles
4. Beutin
5. Campigneulles-les-Grandes
6. Campigneulles-les-Petites
7. Écuires
8. Estrée
9. Estréelles
10. Hubersent
11. Inxent
12. La Calotterie
13. La Madelaine-sous-Montreuil
14. Lépine
15. Montcavrel
16. Montreuil-sur-Mer
17. Nempont-Saint-Firmin
18. Neuville-sous-Montreuil
19. Recques-sur-Course
20. Sorrus
21. Wailly-Beaucamp
