= Canton of Montreuil =

Coordinates: 50.46444°N 1.76417°E

Montreuil
- Former canton
- Interactive map of Montreuil
- Country: France
- Region: Hauts-de-France
- Department: Pas-de-Calais
- No. of communes: {{{nbcomm}}}
- Disbanded: 2015
- Area: 165.68 km^{2} (63.97 sq mi)
- Population (2012): 22,203
  - Density: 134.01/km^{2} (347.09/sq mi)

The canton of Montreuil is a former canton in the Pas-de-Calais department and the Nord-Pas de Calais region. It was disbanded following the French canton reorganisation that came into effect in March 2015. It had a total of 22,203 inhabitants (2012).

== Geography ==
An area of drained marshland and one or two hills, with the town of Montreuil in the Arrondissement of Montreuil at its centre. The altitude varies from 1 m (3 ft 3 in) in Le Touquet-Paris-Plage to 100 m (330 ft) in Neuville-sous-Montreuil, with an average altitude of 74 m (243 ft).

The canton comprised 17 communes:

- Beaumerie-Saint-Martin
- La Calotterie
- Campigneulles-les-Grandes
- Campigneulles-les-Petites
- Cucq
- Écuires
- Lépine
- La Madelaine-sous-Montreuil
- Merlimont
- Montreuil
- Nempont-Saint-Firmin
- Neuville-sous-Montreuil
- Saint-Aubin
- Saint-Josse
- Sorrus
- Le Touquet-Paris-Plage
- Wailly-Beaucamp

== Population ==
Population Growth
1962	1968	1975	1982	1990	1999
15,953	17,328	19,139	19,960	20,942	21,603
Census count starting from 1962 : Population without double counting

== See also ==
- Arrondissements of the Pas-de-Calais department
- Cantons of the Pas-de-Calais department
- Communes of the Pas-de-Calais department
