= Recques =

Recques is part of the name of 2 communes in the Pas-de-Calais department of France:

- Recques-sur-Course
- Recques-sur-Hem
