= Colline-Beaumont =

- Commune
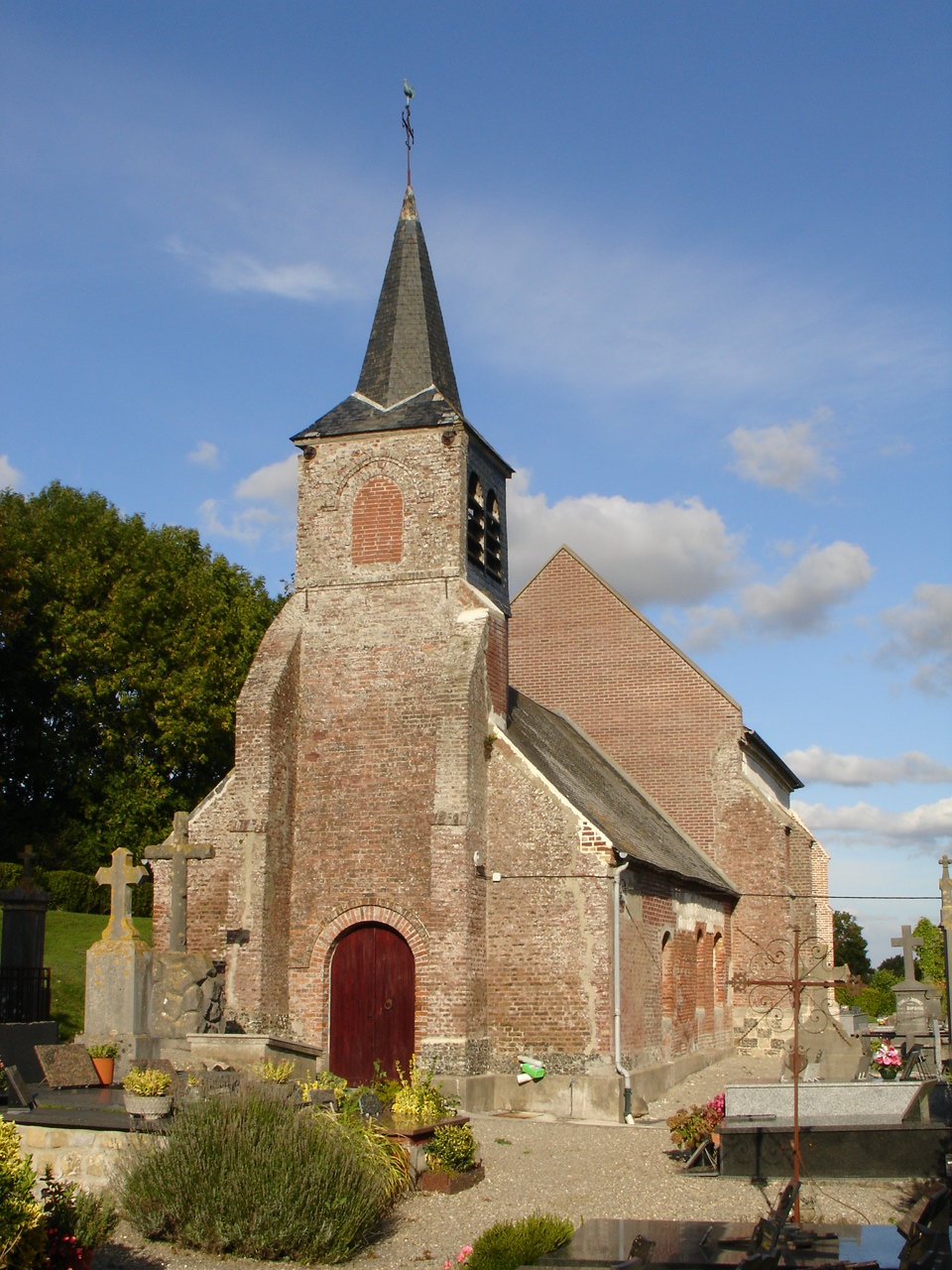
- The church of Colline-Beaumont

- Coat of arms
- Location of Colline-Beaumont
- Location within France Location within Hauts-de-France
- Coordinates: 50°20′25″N 1°40′57″E
- Country: France
- Region: Hauts-de-France
- Department: Pas-de-Calais
- Arrondissement: Montreuil
- Canton: Berck
- Intercommunality: CA Deux Baies en Montreuillois

Government
  - Mayor (2020–2026): Valérie Delorme
- Area^{1}: 4.6 km^{2} (1.8 sq mi)
- Elevation: 15 m (49 ft)
- Highest elevation: 42 m (138 ft)
- Lowest elevation: 2 m (6.6 ft)
- Population (2023): 132
  - Density: 29/km^{2} (74/sq mi)
- Time zone: UTC+01:00 (CET)
  - Summer (DST): UTC+02:00 (CEST)
- INSEE/Postal code: 62231 /62180
- ^{1} French Land Register data, which excludes lakes, ponds, glaciers > 1 km^{2} (0.386 sq mi or 247 acres) and river estuaries.

Colline-Beaumont (French pronunciation: [kɔlin bomɔ̃]) is a commune in the Pas-de-Calais department in the Hauts-de-France region of France.

== Geography ==
A small village situated some 11 miles (17 km) south of Montreuil-sur-Mer on the D141 and D143 road junction, by the banks of the river Authie, the border with the Somme department.

== Population ==
Historical population
Year	Pop.	±% p.a.
1968	93	—
1975	92	−0.15%
1982	74	−3.06%
1990	94	+3.04%
1999	118	+2.56%
2007	141	+2.25%
2012	131	−1.46%
2017	137	+0.90%
2023	132	−0.62%
Source: INSEE

== See also ==
- Communes of the Pas-de-Calais department
