= Conchil-le-Temple =

- Commune
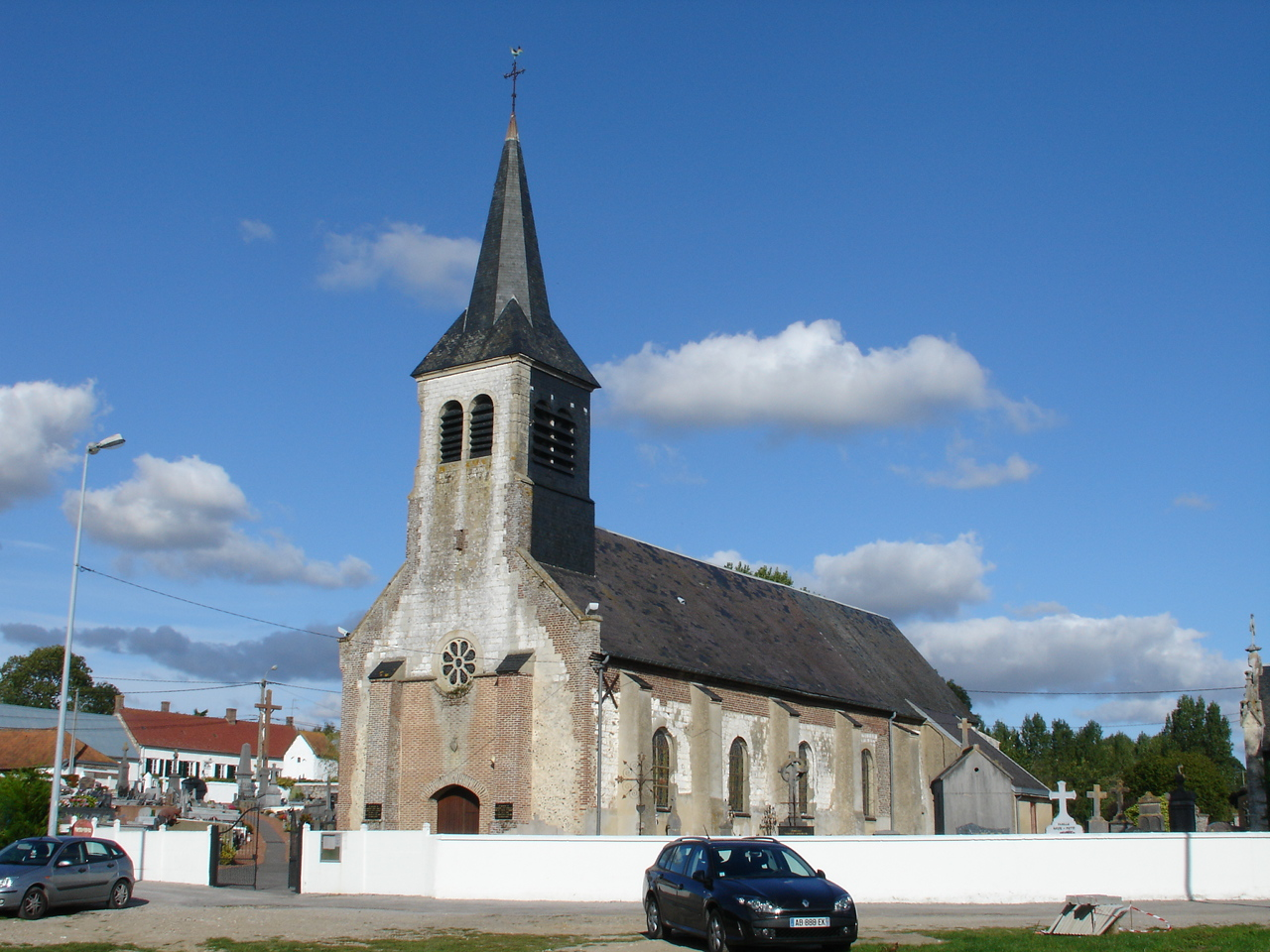
- The church of Conchil-le-Temple

- Coat of arms
- Location of Conchil-le-Temple
- Location within France Location within Hauts-de-France
- Coordinates: 50°22′06″N 1°39′55″E
- Country: France
- Region: Hauts-de-France
- Department: Pas-de-Calais
- Arrondissement: Montreuil
- Canton: Berck
- Intercommunality: CA Deux Baies en Montreuillois

Government
  - Mayor (2020–2026): Daniel Dubois
- Area^{1}: 16.72 km^{2} (6.46 sq mi)
- Elevation: 5 m (16 ft)
- Highest elevation: 57 m (187 ft)
- Lowest elevation: 3 m (9.8 ft)
- Population (2023): 1,073
  - Density: 64.17/km^{2} (166.2/sq mi)
- Time zone: UTC+01:00 (CET)
  - Summer (DST): UTC+02:00 (CEST)
- INSEE/Postal code: 62233 /62180
- ^{1} French Land Register data, which excludes lakes, ponds, glaciers > 1 km^{2} (0.386 sq mi or 247 acres) and river estuaries.

Conchil-le-Temple (French pronunciation: [kɔ̃ʃil lə tɑ̃pl]; Picard: Conchil-l'Tempe) is a commune in the Pas-de-Calais department in the Hauts-de-France region of France.

== Geography ==
It is situated some 8 miles (17 km) southwest of Montreuil-sur-Mer in a rural, wooded area featuring many lakes and nature trails.

== History ==
In 845, it was known as Concilium; in 1406, it was renamed as Conchy-les-Waben; and by 1608, it was renamed again as Conchie.

Conchil was listed among the possessions of the abbey of Saint Riquier in the 9th century. A house known as ’’’Temple-lez-Waben’’’ was a commandery of the Templars. In 1307, two Templars from there, Raoul Monteswis and Eudes of Écuires, were captured and burnt at the stake at nearby Montreuil.

=== Temple-lès-Waben ===
A site historically referred to as Temple-lès-Waben was located in the area known as la Commanderie, a hamlet within the modern commune of Conchil-le-Temple. This Templar establishment was strategically positioned between two roads—one leading to Waben and the other to Montreuil.

A charter dated March 1225–1226 records an agreement between the abbot of Saint-Josse-sur-Mer and the Count of Ponthieu, in which the abbot refers to "our mills at Tigny" and notes that the count would provide men from the community of Waben, explicitly excluding those "banished of the Temple". This implies the presence of a Templar community at Waben during that time.

Further documentation names Jean de Juvigny as the last known preceptor of the Templar house. He was interrogated in June 1308 and again in April 1310 in Paris, during the suppression of the Knights Templar. Despite his prolonged captivity, he was identified as wearing the habit of a Templar sergeant brother.

== Archaeological site ==
The archaeological site of Conchil-le-Temple was extensively excavated by F. Lemaire in 1995. It was revealed to be a noteworthy example of Roman-era rural architecture constructed from wood and earth. Established shortly after the Roman conquest, the site lacks stone foundations, even though it was occupied through successive phases for nearly eight centuries.

The layout of the site resembles that of a Gallo-Roman villa.

== Population ==
Historical population
Year	Pop.	±% p.a.
1968	657	—
1975	698	+0.87%
1982	728	+0.60%
1990	792	+1.06%
1999	789	−0.04%
2007	966	+2.56%
2012	1,101	+2.65%
2017	1,135	+0.61%
2023	1,073	−0.93%
Source: INSEE

== See also ==
- Communes of the Pas-de-Calais department
