= Canton of Berck =

Coordinates: 50.40889°N 1.59333°E

Berck
- Canton
- Location of Berck within the department
- Country: France
- Region: Hauts-de-France
- Department: Pas-de-Calais
- No. of communes: {{{nbcomm}}}
- Area: 231.85 km^{2} (89.52 sq mi)
- Population (2023): 34,393
  - Density: 148.34/km^{2} (384.20/sq mi)
- INSEE code: 6210

The canton of Berck is a canton situated in the Pas-de-Calais département and in the Hauts-de-France region of France.

== Geography ==
The canton surrounds the town of Berck in the arrondissement of Montreuil.

== Composition ==
At the French canton reorganisation which came into effect in March 2015, the canton was expanded from 10 to 31 communes:

- Airon-Notre-Dame
- Airon-Saint-Vaast
- Attin
- Beaumerie-Saint-Martin
- Berck
- Bernieulles
- Beutin
- La Calotterie
- Campigneulles-les-Grandes
- Campigneulles-les-Petites
- Colline-Beaumont
- Conchil-le-Temple
- Écuires
- Estrée
- Estréelles
- Groffliers
- Hubersent
- Inxent
- Lépine
- La Madelaine-sous-Montreuil
- Montcavrel
- Montreuil
- Nempont-Saint-Firmin
- Neuville-sous-Montreuil
- Rang-du-Fliers
- Recques-sur-Course
- Sorrus
- Tigny-Noyelle
- Verton
- Waben
- Wailly-Beaucamp

== Canton Population ==
Historical population
Year	Pop.	±% p.a.
2013	36,031	—
2018	35,132	−0.50%
Source: INSEE

== See also ==
- Cantons of Pas-de-Calais
- Communes of Pas-de-Calais
