= Airon-Notre-Dame =

- Commune
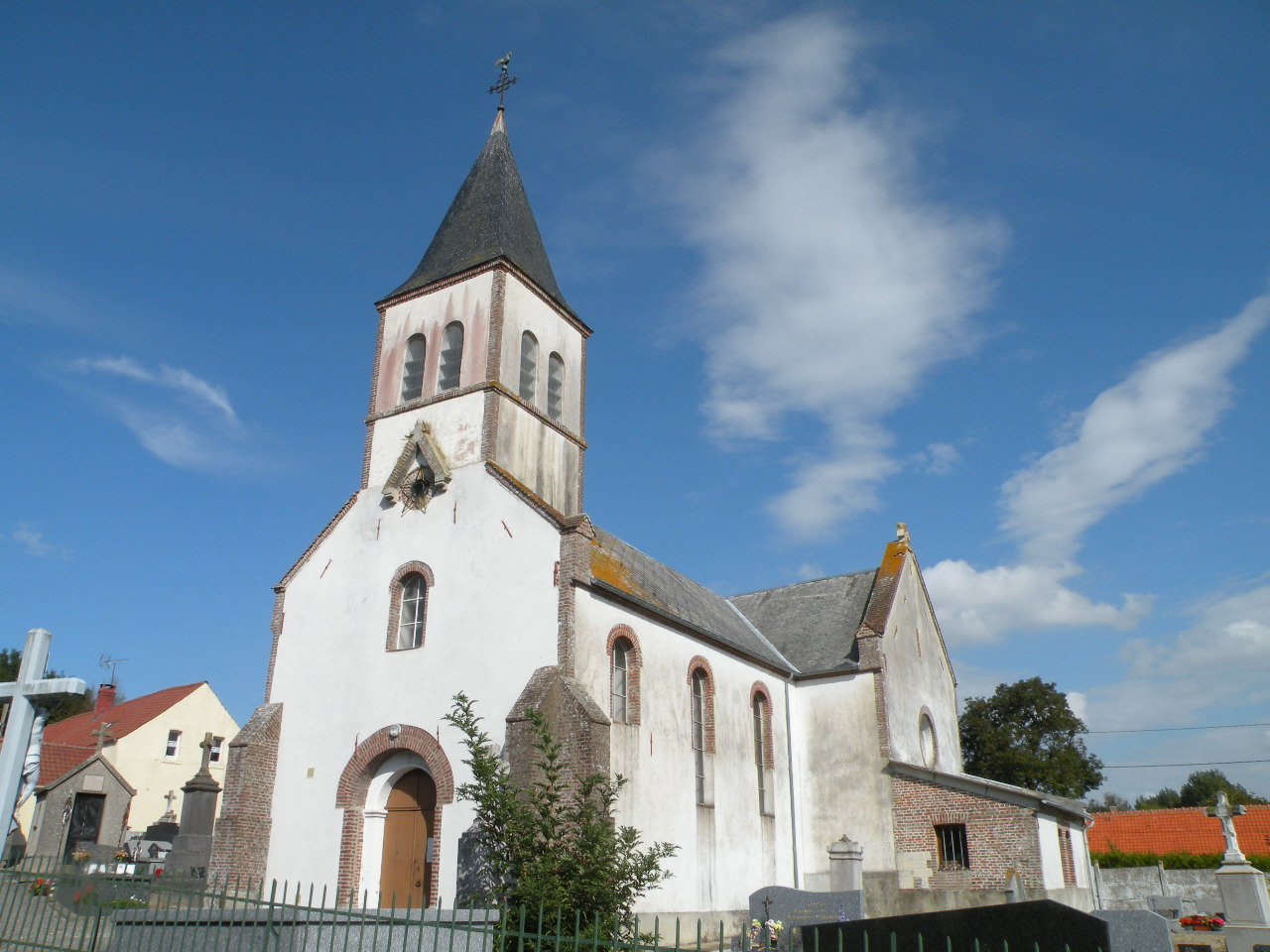
- The church of Airon-Notre-Dame

- Coat of arms
- Location of Airon-Notre-Dame
- Location within France Location within Hauts-de-France
- Coordinates: 50°26′14″N 1°39′36″E
- Country: France
- Region: Hauts-de-France
- Department: Pas-de-Calais
- Arrondissement: Montreuil
- Canton: Berck
- Intercommunality: Deux Baies en Montreuillois

Government
  - Mayor (2020–2026): Marc Delaby
- Area^{1}: 5.05 km^{2} (1.95 sq mi)
- Elevation: 15 m (49 ft)
- Highest elevation: 49 m (161 ft)
- Lowest elevation: 3 m (9.8 ft)
- Population (2023): 261
  - Density: 51.7/km^{2} (134/sq mi)
- Time zone: UTC+01:00 (CET)
  - Summer (DST): UTC+02:00 (CEST)
- INSEE/Postal code: 62015 /62180
- ^{1} French Land Register data, which excludes lakes, ponds, glaciers > 1 km^{2} (0.386 sq mi or 247 acres) and river estuaries.

Airon-Notre-Dame (French pronunciation: [ɛʁɔ nɔtʁ dam]) is a commune in the Pas-de-Calais department in northern France.

== Geography ==
It is a small village situated about 20 miles (32 km) south of Boulogne-sur-Mer, on the D143E1 road

== Population ==
Historical population
Year	Pop.	±% p.a.
1968	157	—
1975	151	−0.56%
1982	149	−0.19%
1990	153	+0.33%
1999	183	+2.01%
2007	197	+0.93%
2012	210	+1.29%
2017	223	+1.21%
2023	261	+2.66%
Source: INSEE

== See also ==
- Communes of the Pas-de-Calais department
