= Airon-Saint-Vaast =

- Commune
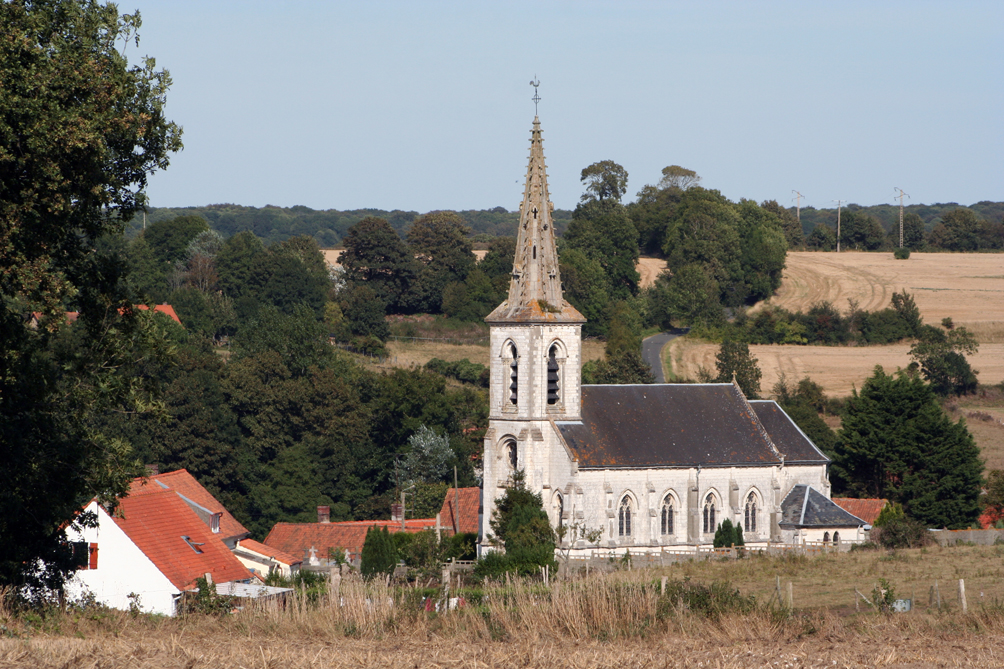
- The church of Airon-Saint-Vaast

- Coat of arms
- Location of Airon-Saint-Vaast
- Location within France Location within Hauts-de-France
- Coordinates: 50°25′56″N 1°40′05″E
- Country: France
- Region: Hauts-de-France
- Department: Pas-de-Calais
- Arrondissement: Montreuil
- Canton: Berck
- Intercommunality: Deux Baies en Montreuillois

Government
  - Mayor (2020–2026): Sébastien Béthouart
- Area^{1}: 5.92 km^{2} (2.29 sq mi)
- Elevation: 8 m (26 ft)
- Highest elevation: 52 m (171 ft)
- Lowest elevation: 4 m (13 ft)
- Population (2023): 185
  - Density: 31.2/km^{2} (80.9/sq mi)
- Time zone: UTC+01:00 (CET)
  - Summer (DST): UTC+02:00 (CEST)
- INSEE/Postal code: 62016 /62180
- ^{1} French Land Register data, which excludes lakes, ponds, glaciers > 1 km^{2} (0.386 sq mi or 247 acres) and river estuaries.

Airon-Saint-Vaast is a commune in the Pas-de-Calais department in northern France.

== Geography ==
A small village situated some 19 miles (30 km) south of Boulogne-sur-Mer, on the D143E1 road

== Population ==
Historical population
Year	Pop.	±% p.a.
1968	144	—
1975	130	−1.45%
1982	120	−1.14%
1990	166	+4.14%
1999	231	+3.74%
2007	218	−0.72%
2012	195	−2.21%
2017	186	−0.94%
2023	185	−0.09%
Source: INSEE

== Sights ==
- The church, built in 1877, in Neo-Gothic style.
- The chapel de Bavemont, built in 1809. This is where Saint Josse is said to have restored the sight of a little girl (Juliule), on his return from a pilgrimage to Rome in 665. In memory of this, a pilgrimage takes place at Whitsuntide.
- The chateau and its park.

== See also ==
- Communes of the Pas-de-Calais department
