= Communauté d'agglomération des Deux Baies en Montreuillois =

Coordinates: 50.46°N 1.76°E

Deux Baies en Montreuillois
- Communauté d'agglomération
- Country: France
- Region: Hauts-de-France
- Department: Pas-de-Calais
- No. of communes: {{{nbcomm}}}
- Established: 2017
- Area: 409.1 km^{2} (158.0 sq mi)
- Population (2018): 66,119
  - Density: 161.6/km^{2} (418.6/sq mi)

The Communauté d'agglomération des Deux Baies en Montreuillois is a communauté d'agglomération, an intercommunal structure, in the Pas-de-Calais department, in the Hauts-de-France region, northern France. It was created in January 2017 by the merger of the former communautés de communes Montreuillois, Opale Sud and Mer et Terres d'Opale. Its seat is in Montreuil. Its area is 409.1 km^{2}. Its population was 66,119 in 2018.

== Composition ==
The communauté d'agglomération consists of the following 46 communes:

1. Airon-Notre-Dame
2. Airon-Saint-Vaast
3. Attin
4. Beaumerie-Saint-Martin
5. Berck
6. Bernieulles
7. Beutin
8. Bréxent-Énocq
9. La Calotterie
10. Camiers
11. Campigneulles-les-Grandes
12. Campigneulles-les-Petites
13. Colline-Beaumont
14. Conchil-le-Temple
15. Cormont
16. Cucq
17. Écuires
18. Estrée
19. Estréelles
20. Étaples
21. Frencq
22. Groffliers
23. Hubersent
24. Inxent
25. Lefaux
26. Lépine
27. Longvilliers
28. La Madelaine-sous-Montreuil
29. Maresville
30. Merlimont
31. Montcavrel
32. Montreuil
33. Nempont-Saint-Firmin
34. Neuville-sous-Montreuil
35. Rang-du-Fliers
36. Recques-sur-Course
37. Saint-Aubin
38. Saint-Josse
39. Sorrus
40. Tigny-Noyelle
41. Le Touquet-Paris-Plage
42. Tubersent
43. Verton
44. Waben
45. Wailly-Beaucamp
46. Widehem
