= Waben =

- Commune
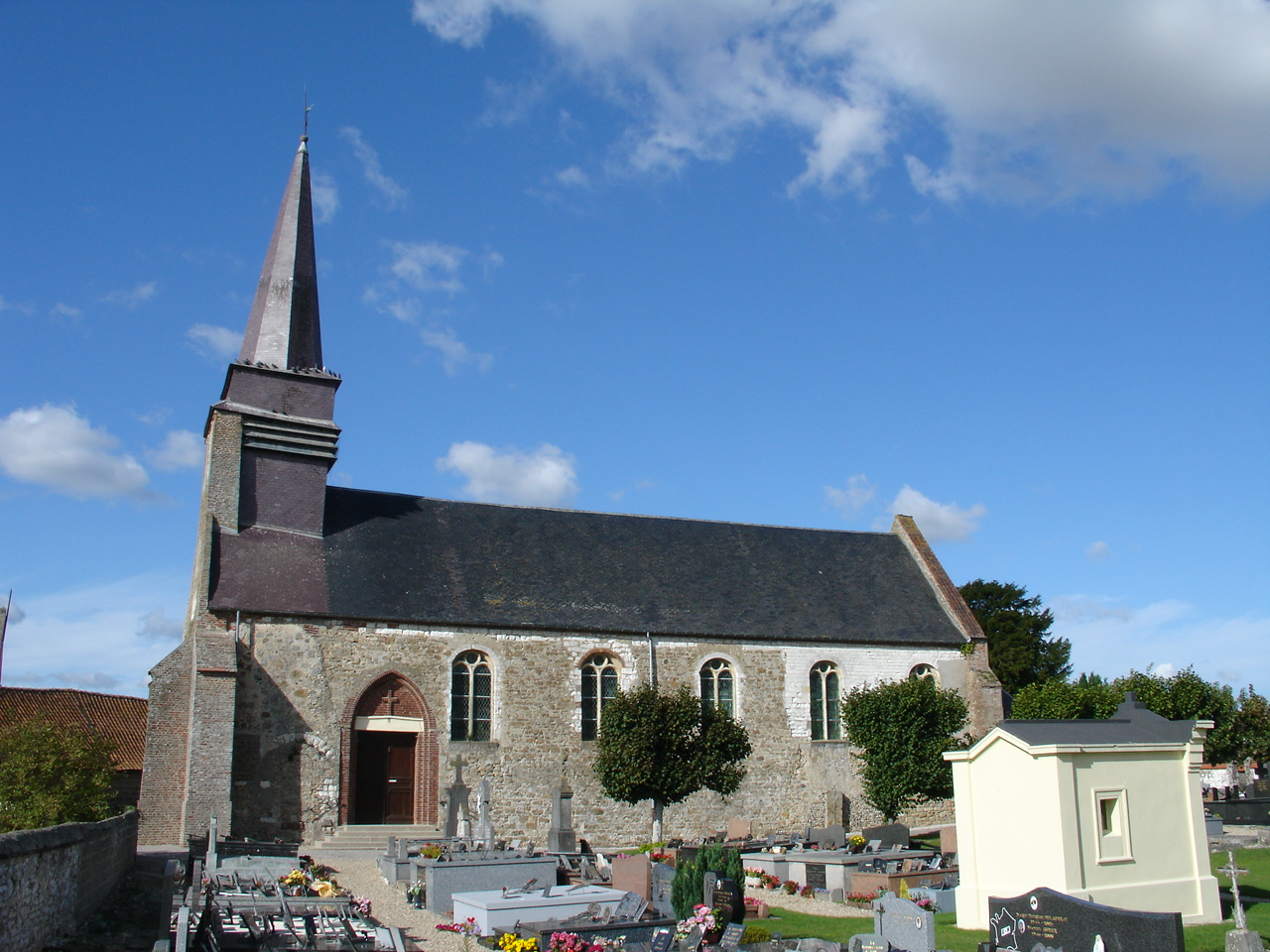
- The church of Waben

- Coat of arms
- Location of Waben
- Location within France Location within Hauts-de-France
- Coordinates: 50°22′48″N 1°39′11″E
- Country: France
- Region: Hauts-de-France
- Department: Pas-de-Calais
- Arrondissement: Montreuil
- Canton: Berck
- Intercommunality: Deux Baies en Montreuillois

Government
  - Mayor (2020–2026): Jean-Claude Gauduin
- Area^{1}: 8.99 km^{2} (3.47 sq mi)
- Elevation: 9 m (30 ft)
- Highest elevation: 51 m (167 ft)
- Lowest elevation: 3 m (9.8 ft)
- Population (2023): 449
  - Density: 49.9/km^{2} (129/sq mi)
- Time zone: UTC+01:00 (CET)
  - Summer (DST): UTC+02:00 (CEST)
- INSEE/Postal code: 62866 /62180
- ^{1} French Land Register data, which excludes lakes, ponds, glaciers > 1 km^{2} (0.386 sq mi or 247 acres) and river estuaries.

Waben is a commune in the Pas-de-Calais department in the Hauts-de-France region of France 8 miles (13 km) southwest of Montreuil-sur-Mer, about a kilometre from the sea at the estuary of the Authie.

== Population ==
Historical population
Year	Pop.	±% p.a.
1968	234	—
1975	235	+0.06%
1982	266	+1.79%
1990	294	+1.26%
1999	327	+1.19%
2007	386	+2.10%
2012	427	+2.04%
2017	431	+0.19%
2023	449	+0.68%
Source: INSEE

== See also ==
- Communes of the Pas-de-Calais department
