= Bernieulles =

Bernieulles Bernelis
- Commune
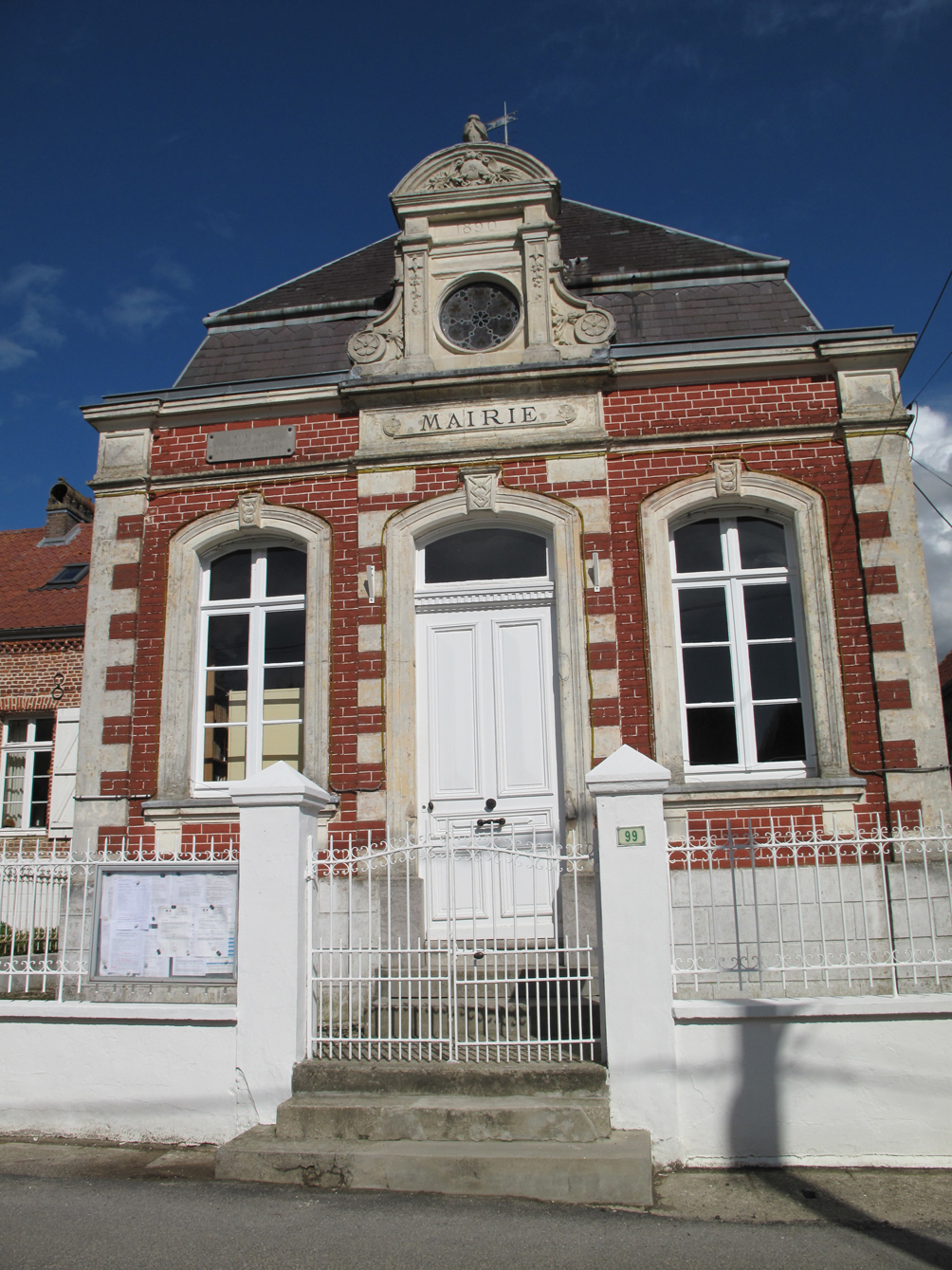
- The town hall of Bernieulles

- Coat of arms
- Location of Bernieulles
- Location within France Location within Hauts-de-France
- Coordinates: 50°33′20″N 1°46′29″E
- Country: France
- Region: Hauts-de-France
- Department: Pas-de-Calais
- Arrondissement: Montreuil
- Canton: Berck
- Intercommunality: CA Deux Baies en Montreuillois

Government
  - Mayor (2020–2026): David Caux
- Area^{1}: 5.74 km^{2} (2.22 sq mi)
- Elevation: 60 m (200 ft)
- Highest elevation: 120 m (390 ft)
- Lowest elevation: 41 m (135 ft)
- Population (2023): 162
  - Density: 28.2/km^{2} (73.1/sq mi)
- Time zone: UTC+01:00 (CET)
  - Summer (DST): UTC+02:00 (CEST)
- INSEE/Postal code: 62116 /62170
- ^{1} French Land Register data, which excludes lakes, ponds, glaciers > 1 km^{2} (0.386 sq mi or 247 acres) and river estuaries.

Bernieulles (French pronunciation: [bɛʁnjœl]; West Flemish: Bernelis) is a commune in the Pas-de-Calais department in the Hauts-de-France region in northern France.

== Geography ==
A small village situated some 8 miles (13 km) north of Montreuil-sur-Mer, on the D147 road.

== Population ==
Historical population
Year	Pop.	±% p.a.
1968	234	—
1975	192	−2.79%
1982	185	−0.53%
1990	201	+1.04%
1999	207	+0.33%
2007	199	−0.49%
2012	194	−0.51%
2017	184	−1.05%
2023	162	−2.10%
Source: INSEE

== See also ==
- Communes of the Pas-de-Calais department
