= Attin =

- Commune
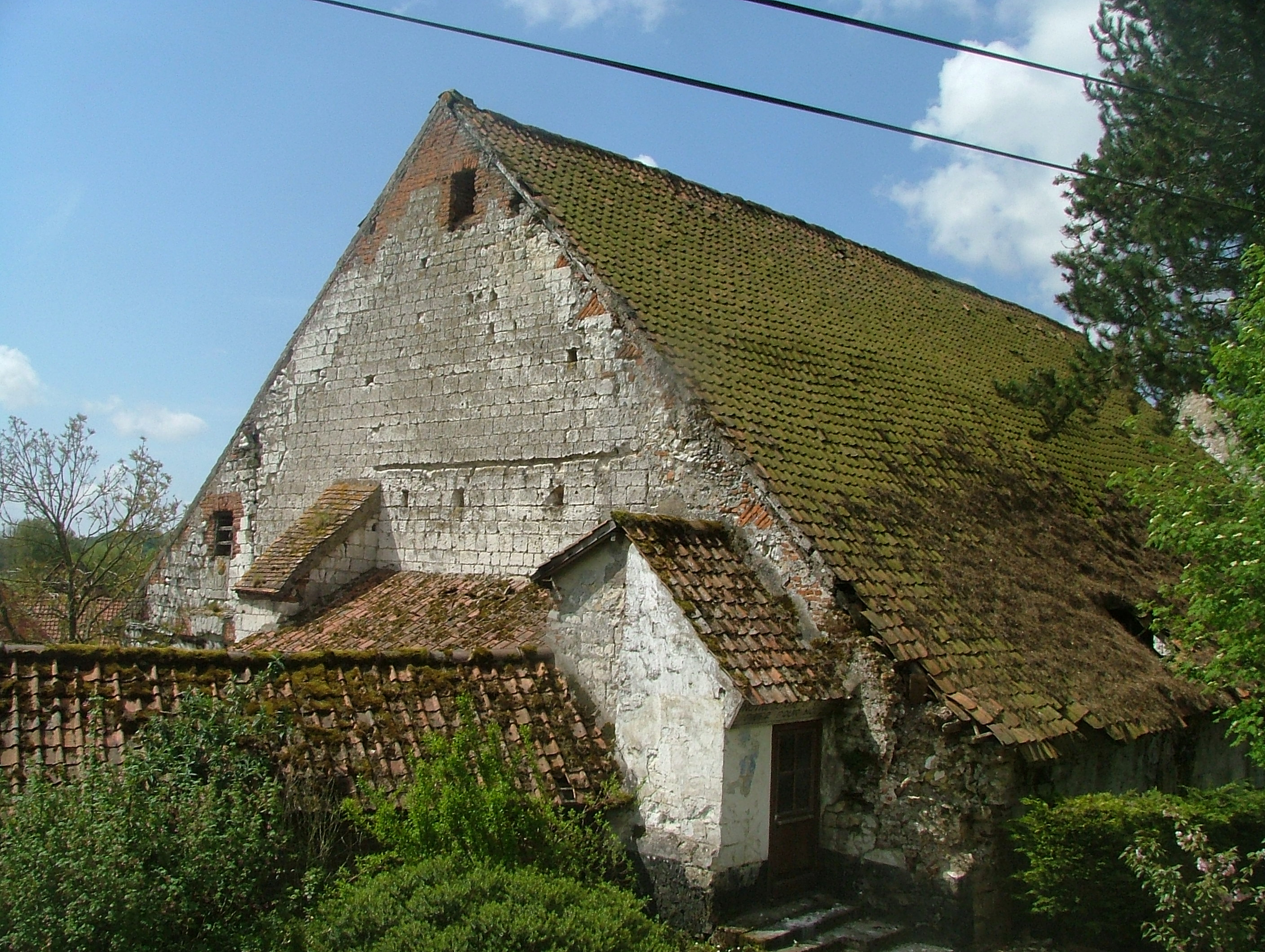
- The farm of l'Abbiette

- Coat of arms
- Location of Attin
- Location within France Location within Hauts-de-France
- Coordinates: 50°29′14″N 1°44′55″E
- Country: France
- Region: Hauts-de-France
- Department: Pas-de-Calais
- Arrondissement: Montreuil
- Canton: Berck
- Intercommunality: CA Deux Baies en Montreuillois

Government
  - Mayor (2020–2026): Philippe Fourcroy
- Area^{1}: 6.7 km^{2} (2.6 sq mi)
- Elevation: 11 m (36 ft)
- Highest elevation: 77 m (253 ft)
- Lowest elevation: 2 m (6.6 ft)
- Population (2023): 885
  - Density: 130/km^{2} (340/sq mi)
- Time zone: UTC+01:00 (CET)
  - Summer (DST): UTC+02:00 (CEST)
- INSEE/Postal code: 62044 /62170
- ^{1} French Land Register data, which excludes lakes, ponds, glaciers > 1 km^{2} (0.386 sq mi or 247 acres) and river estuaries.

Attin (French pronunciation: [atɛ̃]) is a commune in the Pas-de-Calais department in northern France.

== Geography ==
A small village situated 2 miles (3 km) north of Montreuil-sur-Mer, on the N39 road.

== Population ==
Historical population
Year	Pop.	±% p.a.
1968	450	—
1975	427	−0.75%
1982	513	+2.66%
1990	560	+1.10%
1999	682	+2.21%
2007	752	+1.23%
2012	696	−1.54%
2017	729	+0.93%
2023	885	+3.28%
Source: INSEE

== See also ==
- Communes of the Pas-de-Calais department
