= Estrée =

- Commune
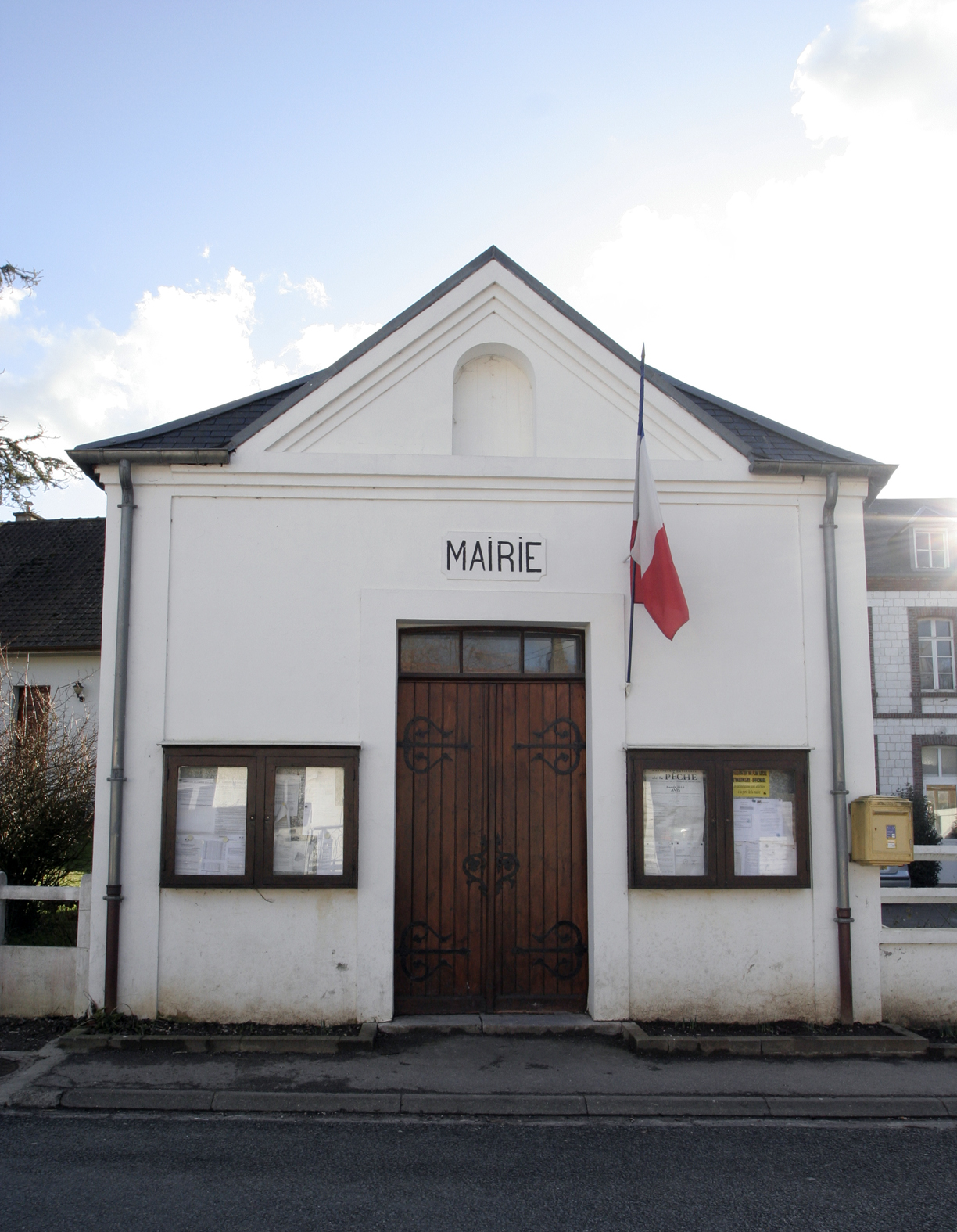
- The town hall of Estrée

- Coat of arms
- Location of Estrée
- Location within France Location within Hauts-de-France
- Coordinates: 50°30′00″N 1°47′26″E
- Country: France
- Region: Hauts-de-France
- Department: Pas-de-Calais
- Arrondissement: Montreuil
- Canton: Berck
- Intercommunality: CA Deux Baies en Montreuillois

Government
  - Mayor (2020–2026): Marc Briet
- Area^{1}: 4.47 km^{2} (1.73 sq mi)
- Elevation: 13 m (43 ft)
- Highest elevation: 116 m (381 ft)
- Lowest elevation: 6 m (20 ft)
- Population (2023): 304
  - Density: 68.0/km^{2} (176/sq mi)
- Time zone: UTC+01:00 (CET)
  - Summer (DST): UTC+02:00 (CEST)
- INSEE/Postal code: 62312 /62170
- ^{1} French Land Register data, which excludes lakes, ponds, glaciers > 1 km^{2} (0.386 sq mi or 247 acres) and river estuaries.

Estrée is a commune in the Pas-de-Calais department in the Hauts-de-France region of France 3 miles (5 km) northeast of Montreuil-sur-Mer.

== Population ==
Historical population
Year	Pop.	±% p.a.
1968	155	—
1975	137	−1.75%
1982	237	+8.14%
1990	274	+1.83%
1999	276	+0.08%
2007	302	+1.13%
2012	297	−0.33%
2017	290	−0.48%
2023	304	+0.79%
Source: INSEE

== See also ==
- Communes of the Pas-de-Calais department
