= Beutin =

- Commune
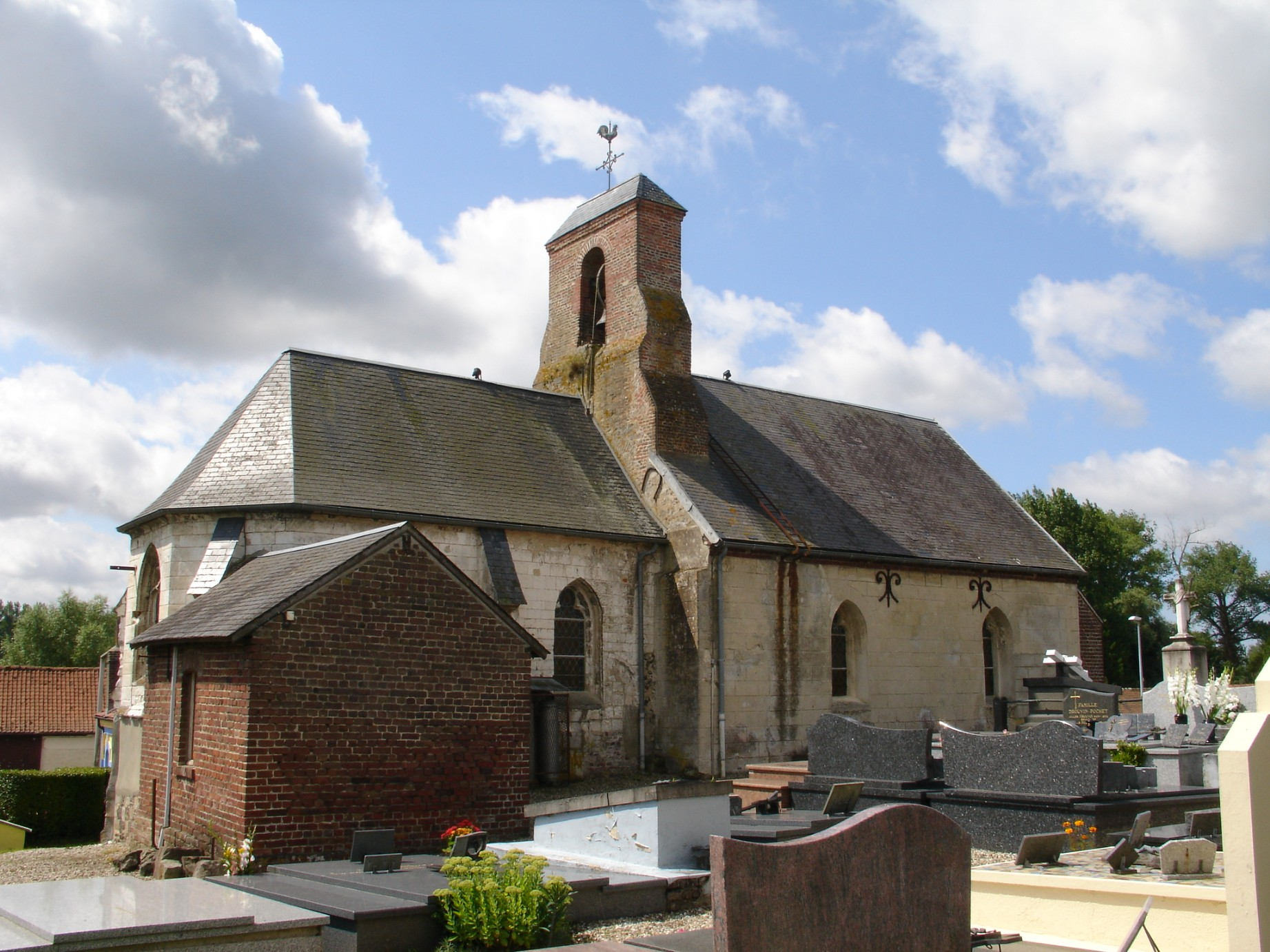
- The church of Beutin

- Coat of arms
- Location of Beutin
- Location within France Location within Hauts-de-France
- Coordinates: 50°29′30″N 1°43′37″E
- Country: France
- Region: Hauts-de-France
- Department: Pas-de-Calais
- Arrondissement: Montreuil
- Canton: Berck
- Intercommunality: CA Deux Baies en Montreuillois

Government
  - Mayor (2020–2026): Dominique Masson
- Area^{1}: 3 km^{2} (1.2 sq mi)
- Elevation: 10 m (33 ft)
- Highest elevation: 67 m (220 ft)
- Lowest elevation: 4 m (13 ft)
- Population (2023): 436
  - Density: 150/km^{2} (380/sq mi)
- Time zone: UTC+01:00 (CET)
  - Summer (DST): UTC+02:00 (CEST)
- INSEE/Postal code: 62124 /62170
- ^{1} French Land Register data, which excludes lakes, ponds, glaciers > 1 km^{2} (0.386 sq mi or 247 acres) and river estuaries.

Beutin (French pronunciation: [bøtɛ̃]) is a commune in the Pas-de-Calais department in the Hauts-de-France region in northern France.

== Geography ==
A small village situated some 4 miles(6 km) northwest of Montreuil-sur-Mer, on the N39 road, by the banks of the Canche river.

== Population ==
Historical population
| Year | Pop. | ±% p.a. |
|---|---|---|
| 1968 | 234 | — |
| 1975 | 233 | −0.06% |
| 1982 | 294 | +3.38% |
| 1990 | 323 | +1.18% |
| 1999 | 373 | +1.61% |
| 2007 | 506 | +3.89% |
| 2012 | 476 | −1.21% |
| 2017 | 466 | −0.42% |
| 2023 | 436 | −1.10% |
Source: INSEE

== See also ==
- Communes of the Pas-de-Calais department
