= Montcavrel =

- Commune
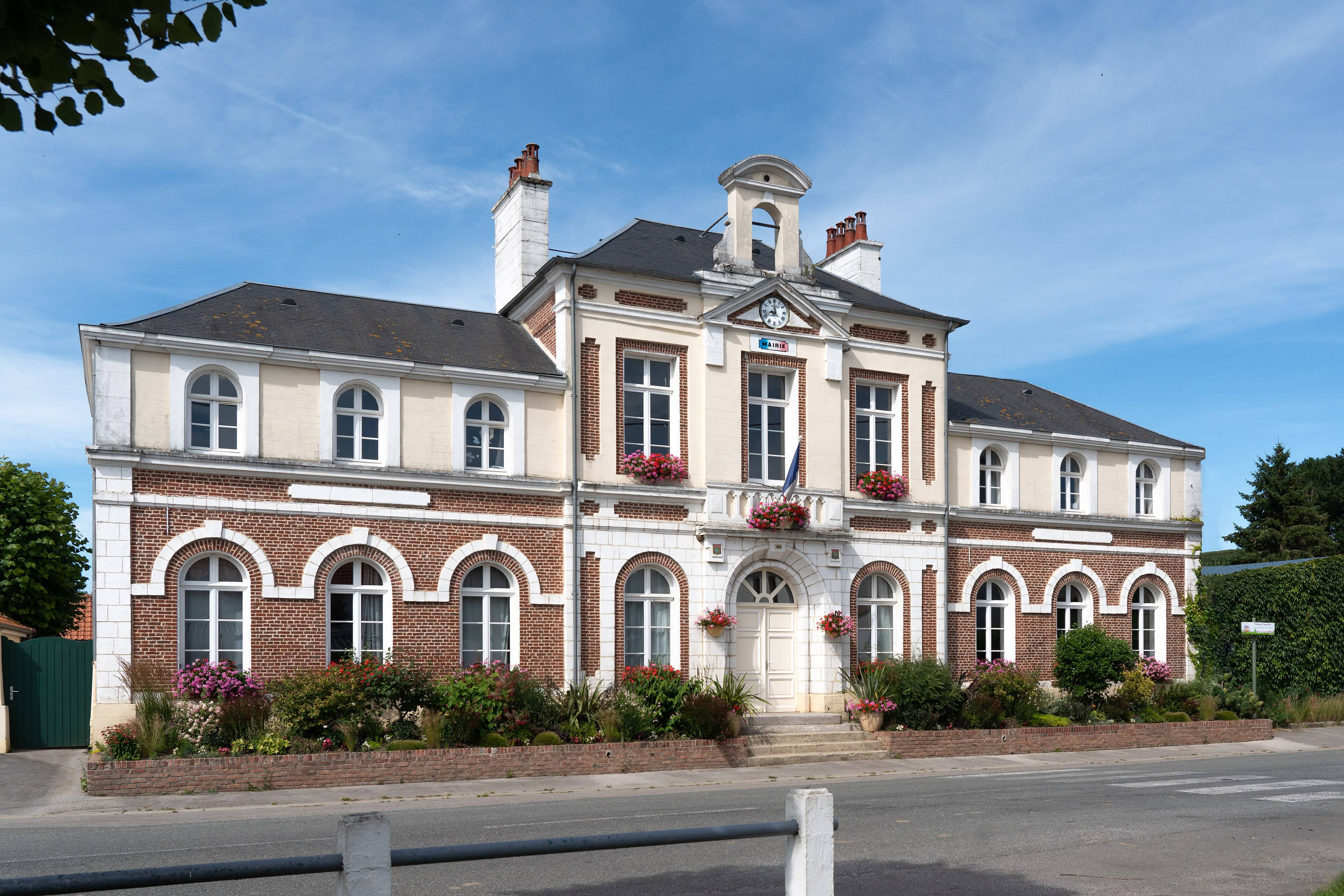
- The town hall of Montcavrel

- Coat of arms
- Location of Montcavrel
- Location within France Location within Hauts-de-France
- Coordinates: 50°30′59″N 1°48′41″E
- Country: France
- Region: Hauts-de-France
- Department: Pas-de-Calais
- Arrondissement: Montreuil
- Canton: Berck
- Intercommunality: CA Deux Baies en Montreuillois

Government
  - Mayor (2020–2026): Jean Paul de Longueval
- Area^{1}: 9.56 km^{2} (3.69 sq mi)
- Elevation: 24 m (79 ft)
- Highest elevation: 131 m (430 ft)
- Lowest elevation: 11 m (36 ft)
- Population (2023): 384
  - Density: 40.2/km^{2} (104/sq mi)
- Time zone: UTC+01:00 (CET)
  - Summer (DST): UTC+02:00 (CEST)
- INSEE/Postal code: 62585 /62170
- ^{1} French Land Register data, which excludes lakes, ponds, glaciers > 1 km^{2} (0.386 sq mi or 247 acres) and river estuaries.

Montcavrel (French pronunciation: [mɔ̃kavʁɛl]) is a commune in the Pas-de-Calais department in the Hauts-de-France region of France.

== Geography ==
Montcavrel is situated in the valley of the small river Bimoise, 4 miles (6 km) north of Montreuil-sur-Mer, on the D149 and D150 road junction.

== Population ==
Historical population
Year	Pop.	±% p.a.
1968	401	—
1975	402	+0.04%
1982	341	−2.32%
1990	330	−0.41%
1999	332	+0.07%
2007	347	+0.55%
2012	388	+2.26%
2017	413	+1.26%
2023	384	−1.21%
Source: INSEE

== Places of interest ==
- The fifteenth-century church of St.Quentin.
- The château d'Hérambault 1845, in Renaissance style
- The nineteenth-century château de Montéchor.
- A watermill at Fordres.

== See also ==
- Communes of the Pas-de-Calais department
