= Inxent =

Inxent Enessem
- Commune
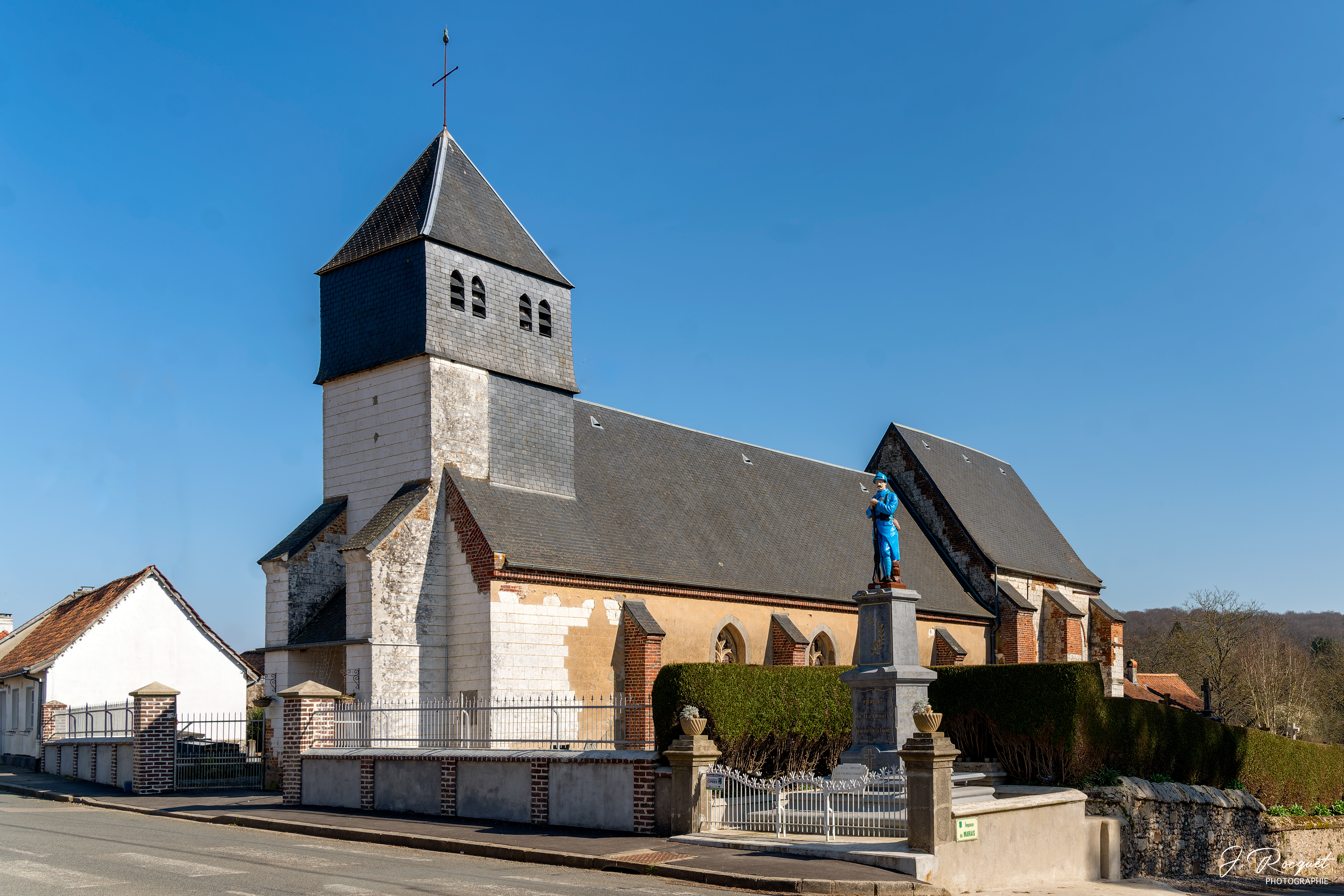
- The church of Inxent

- Coat of arms
- Location of Inxent
- Location within France Location within Hauts-de-France
- Coordinates: 50°32′02″N 1°47′03″E
- Country: France
- Region: Hauts-de-France
- Department: Pas-de-Calais
- Arrondissement: Montreuil
- Canton: Berck
- Intercommunality: CA Deux Baies en Montreuillois

Government
  - Mayor (2020–2026): Dominique Bigand
- Area^{1}: 3.78 km^{2} (1.46 sq mi)
- Elevation: 28 m (92 ft)
- Highest elevation: 113 m (371 ft)
- Lowest elevation: 21 m (69 ft)
- Population (2023): 157
  - Density: 41.5/km^{2} (108/sq mi)
- Time zone: UTC+01:00 (CET)
  - Summer (DST): UTC+02:00 (CEST)
- INSEE/Postal code: 62472 /62170
- ^{1} French Land Register data, which excludes lakes, ponds, glaciers > 1 km^{2} (0.386 sq mi or 247 acres) and river estuaries.

Inxent (French pronunciation: [ɛ̃ksɑ̃]; West Flemish: Enessem) is a commune in the Pas-de-Calais department in the Hauts-de-France region of France.

== Geography ==
A small village situated some 5 miles (8 km) north of Montreuil-sur-Mer on the D127 road, in the valley of the river Course.

== Population ==
Historical population
Year	Pop.	±% p.a.
1968	190	—
1975	177	−1.01%
1982	170	−0.57%
1990	157	−0.99%
1999	158	+0.07%
2007	155	−0.24%
2012	172	+2.10%
2017	162	−1.19%
2023	157	−0.52%
Source: INSEE

== Places of interest ==
- The church of the Nativité-de-Notre-Dame, dating from the thirteenth century.
- A partially restored watermill.

== See also ==
- Communes of the Pas-de-Calais department
