= Hubersent =

- Commune
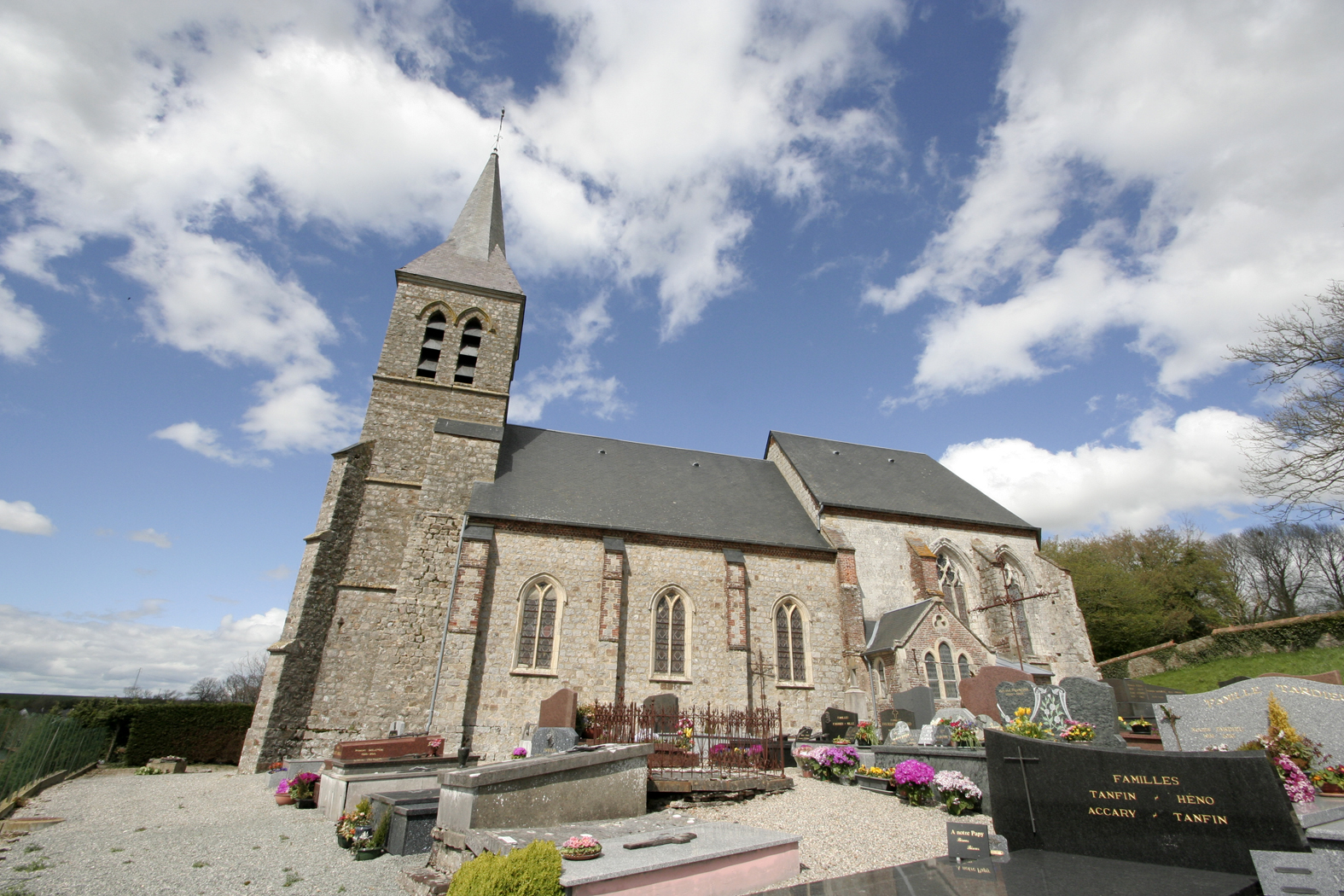
- The church of Hubersent

- Coat of arms
- Location of Hubersent
- Location within France Location within Hauts-de-France
- Coordinates: 50°34′55″N 1°43′42″E
- Country: France
- Region: Hauts-de-France
- Department: Pas-de-Calais
- Arrondissement: Montreuil
- Canton: Berck
- Intercommunality: CA Deux Baies en Montreuillois

Government
  - Mayor (2020–2026): Maxime Duval
- Area^{1}: 7.97 km^{2} (3.08 sq mi)
- Elevation: 103 m (338 ft)
- Highest elevation: 132 m (433 ft)
- Lowest elevation: 59 m (194 ft)
- Population (2023): 272
  - Density: 34.1/km^{2} (88.4/sq mi)
- Time zone: UTC+01:00 (CET)
  - Summer (DST): UTC+02:00 (CEST)
- INSEE/Postal code: 62460 /62630
- ^{1} French Land Register data, which excludes lakes, ponds, glaciers > 1 km^{2} (0.386 sq mi or 247 acres) and river estuaries.

Hubersent (French pronunciation: [ybɛʁsɑ̃]) is a commune in the Pas-de-Calais department in the Hauts-de-France region of France.

== Geography ==
A village situated some 10 miles (16 km) north of Montreuil-sur-Mer, just off the N1, on the D148E1 road.

== Population ==
Historical population
Year	Pop.	±% p.a.
1968	224	—
1975	196	−1.89%
1982	219	+1.60%
1990	222	+0.17%
1999	225	+0.15%
2007	245	+1.07%
2012	251	+0.49%
2017	269	+1.39%
2023	272	+0.19%
Source: INSEE

== Places of interest ==
- The church of St.Martin, dating from the sixteenth century.

== See also ==
- Communes of the Pas-de-Calais department
