= Estréelles =

- Commune
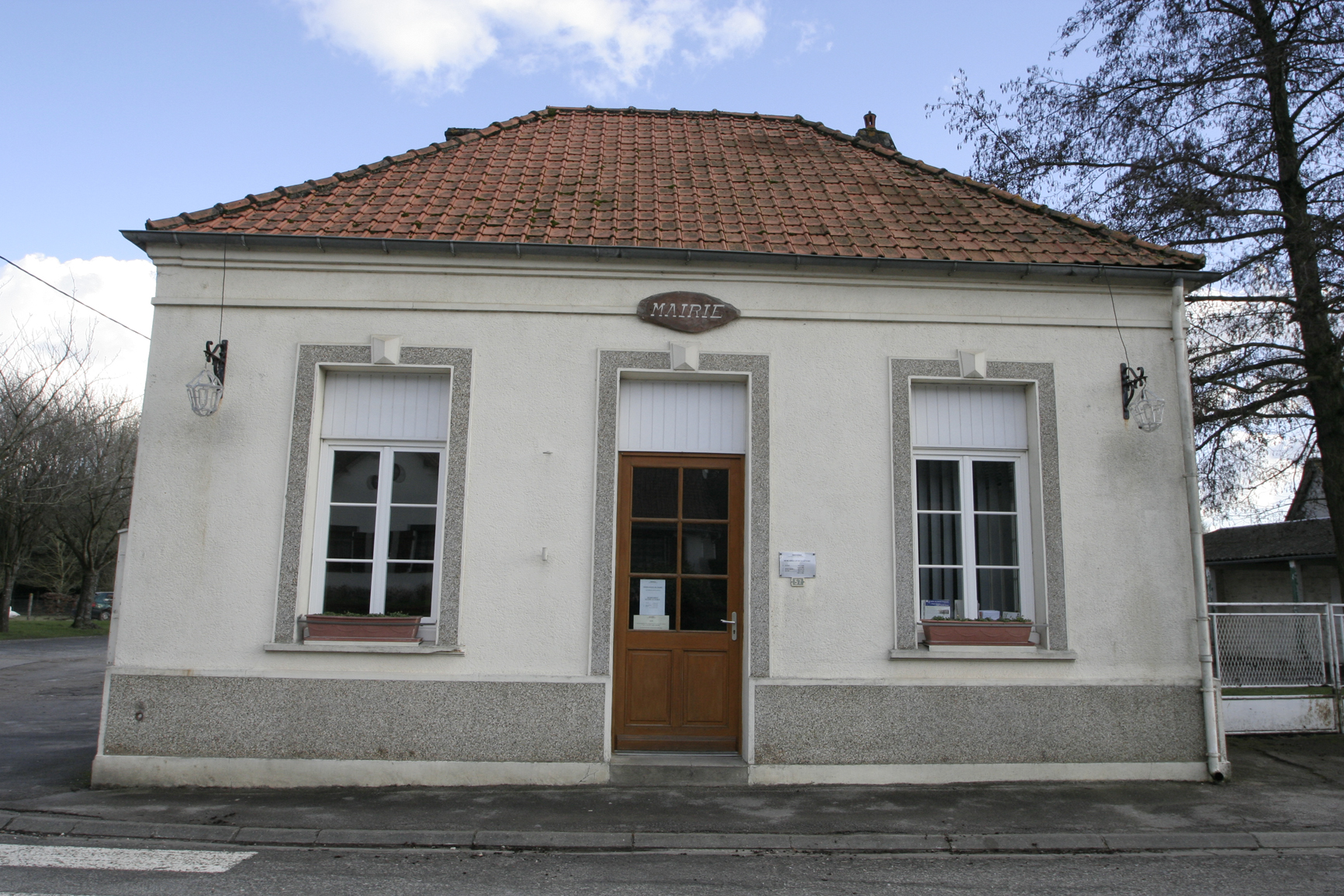
- The town hall of Estréelles

- Coat of arms
- Location of Estréelles
- Location within France Location within Hauts-de-France
- Coordinates: 50°29′59″N 1°47′05″E
- Country: France
- Region: Hauts-de-France
- Department: Pas-de-Calais
- Arrondissement: Montreuil
- Canton: Berck
- Intercommunality: CA Deux Baies en Montreuillois

Government
  - Mayor (2020–2026): Hubert Maquaire
- Area^{1}: 3.18 km^{2} (1.23 sq mi)
- Elevation: 10 m (33 ft)
- Highest elevation: 79 m (259 ft)
- Lowest elevation: 5 m (16 ft)
- Population (2023): 342
  - Density: 108/km^{2} (279/sq mi)
- Time zone: UTC+01:00 (CET)
  - Summer (DST): UTC+02:00 (CEST)
- INSEE/Postal code: 62315 /62170
- ^{1} French Land Register data, which excludes lakes, ponds, glaciers > 1 km^{2} (0.386 sq mi or 247 acres) and river estuaries.

Estréelles is a commune in the Pas-de-Calais department in the Hauts-de-France region of France.

== Geography ==
A village situated some 3 miles (5 km) northeast of Montreuil-sur-Mer at the D127 road.

== Population ==
Historical population
Year	Pop.	±% p.a.
1968	164	—
1975	163	−0.09%
1982	176	+1.10%
1990	229	+3.35%
1999	269	+1.80%
2007	324	+2.35%
2012	362	+2.24%
2017	352	−0.56%
2023	342	−0.48%
Source: INSEE

== Places of interest ==
- The seventeenth-century church of Saint Omer
- The former Protestant church of the late 15th century, which was demolished in 1970. Foundations of chequered sandstone and carved flint are all that remain.
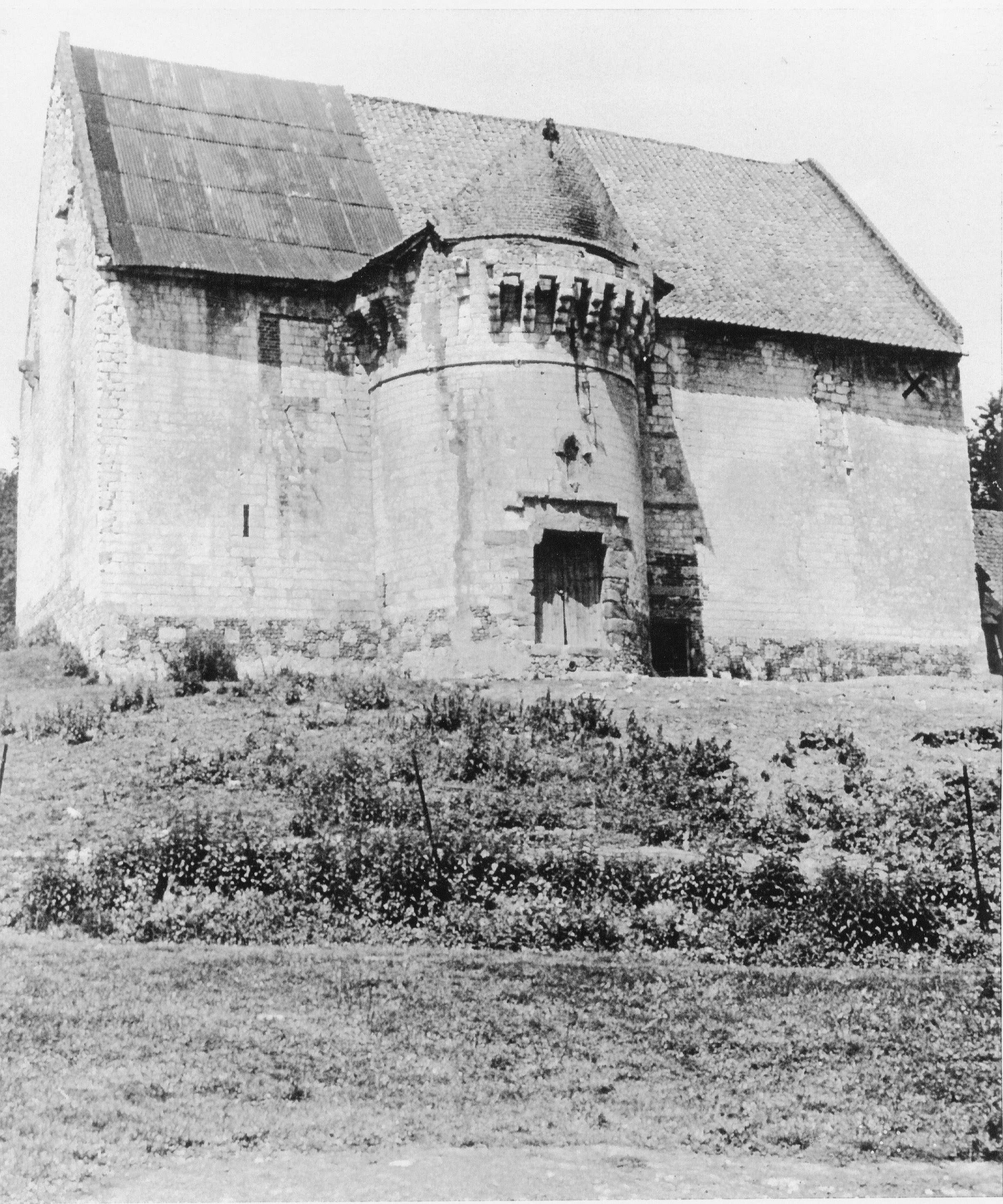
The Protestant church, known as "The fort".

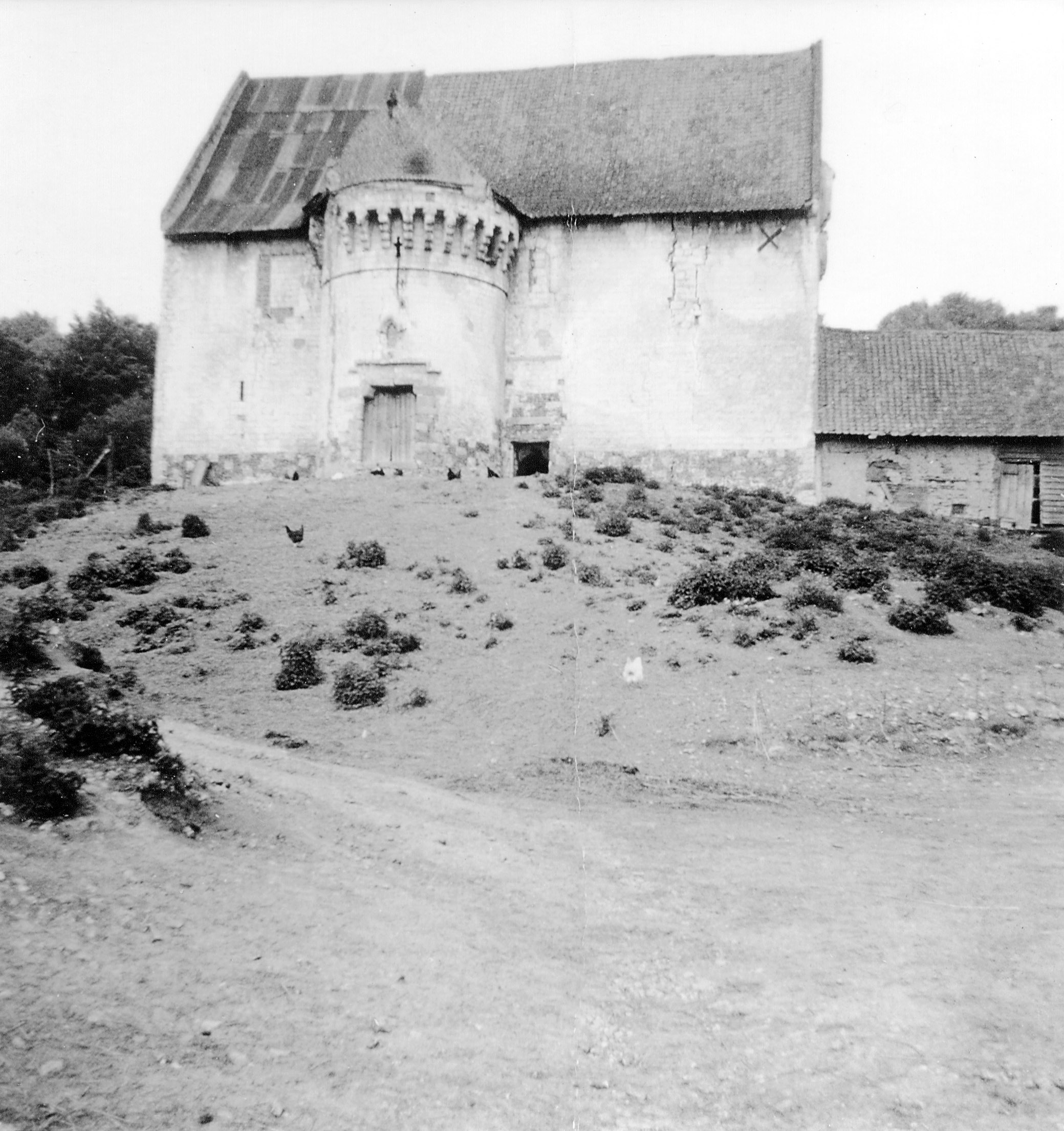
Front view

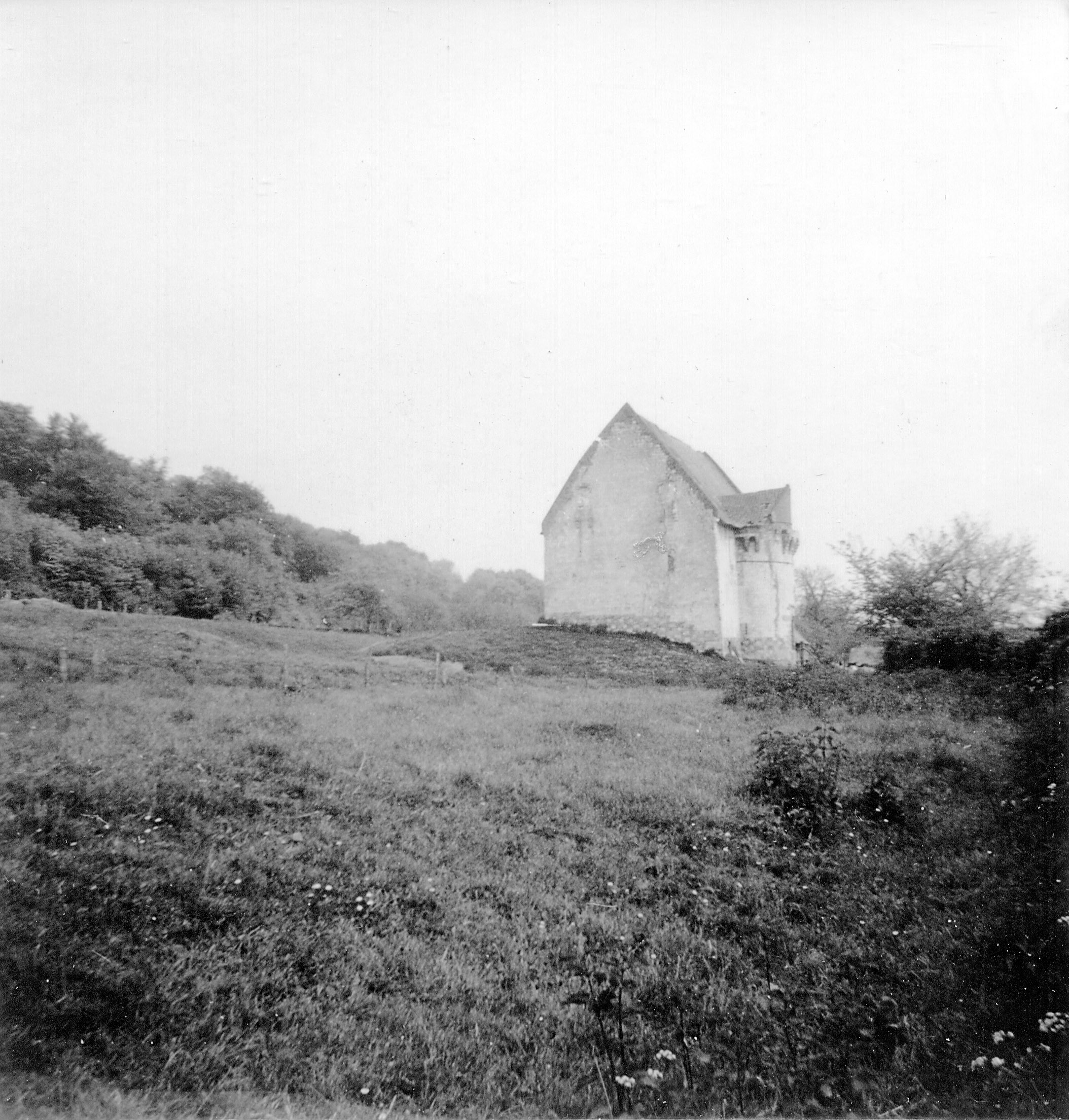
Side view

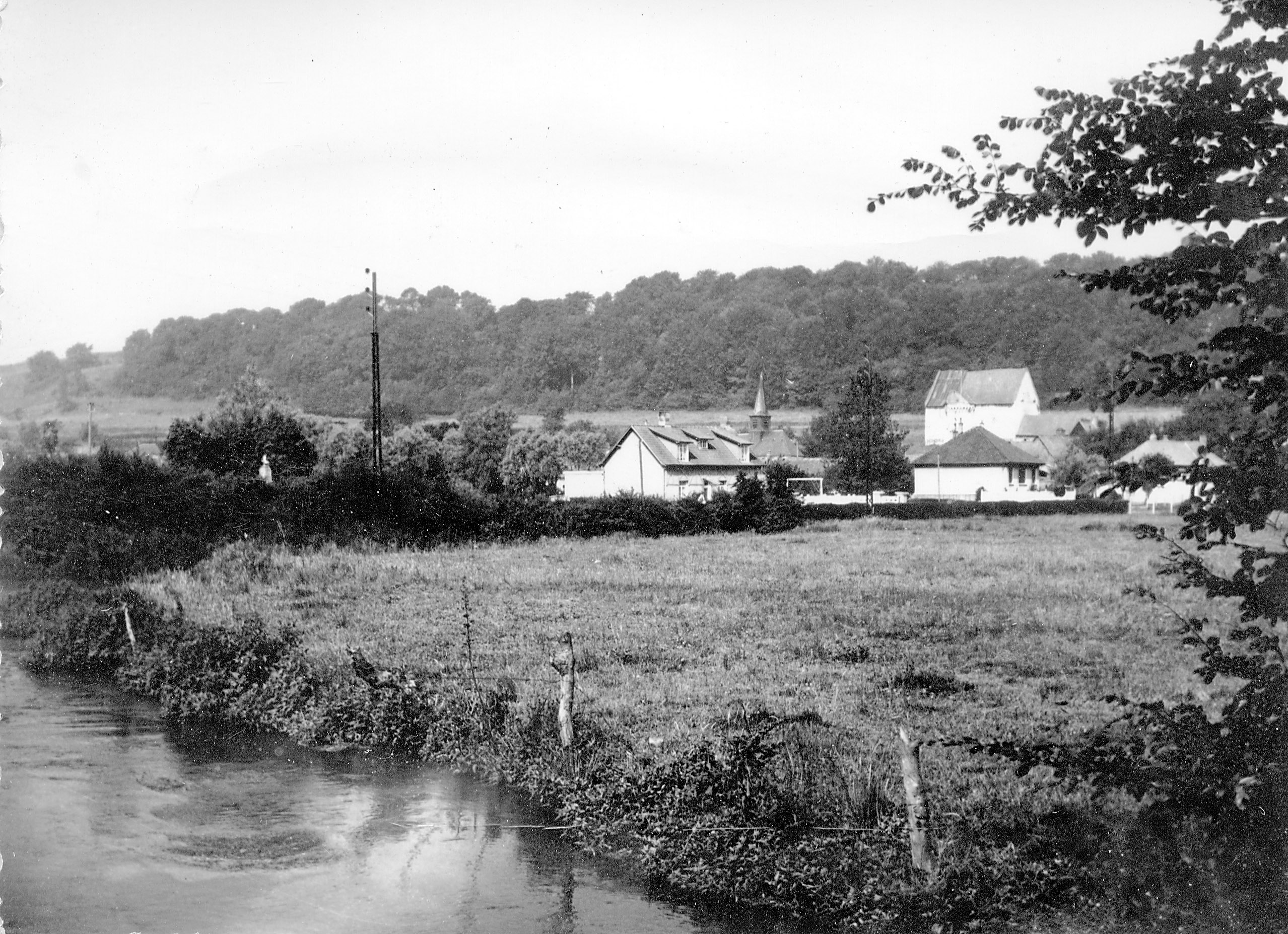
From the valley

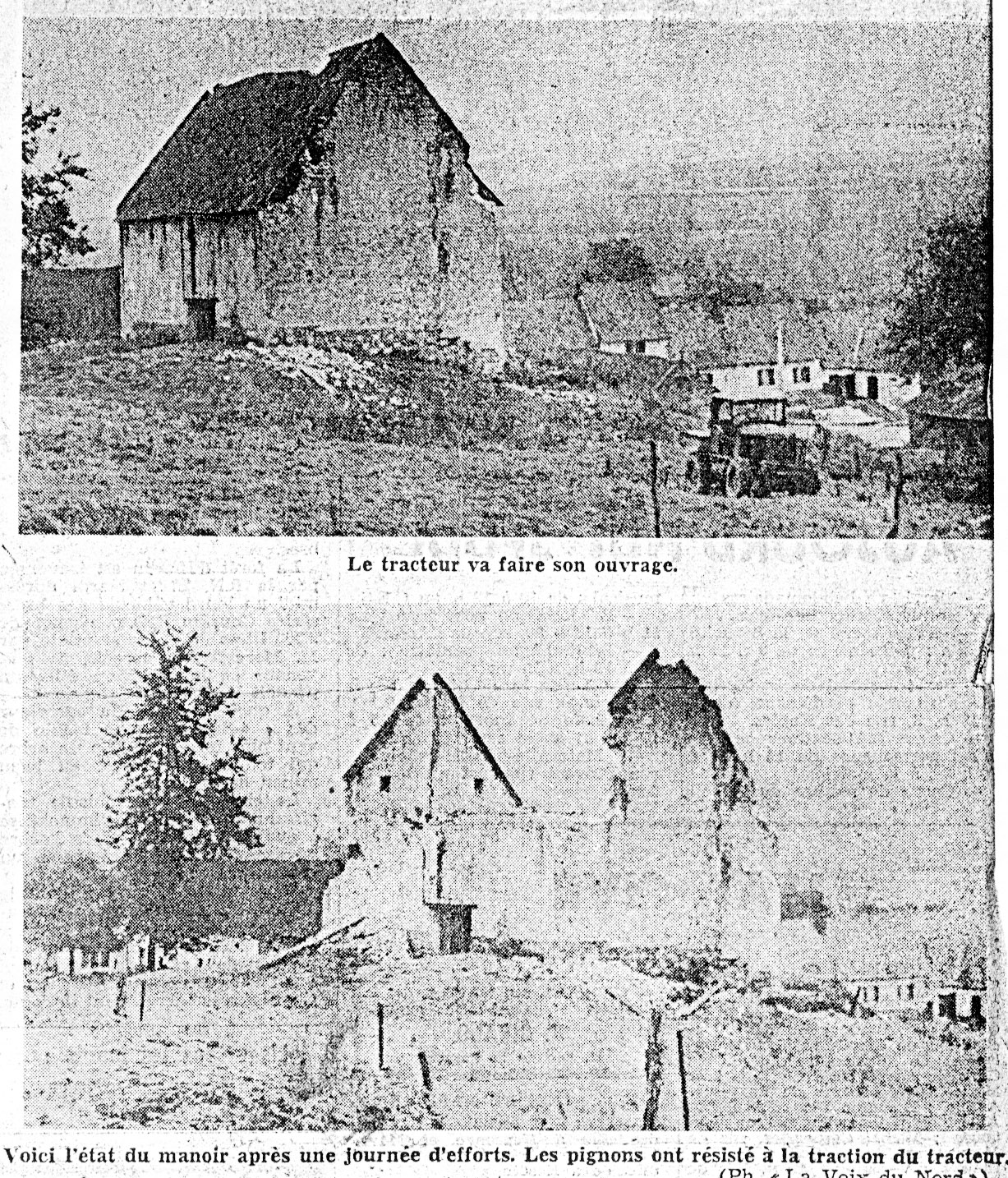
During demolition, in 1970

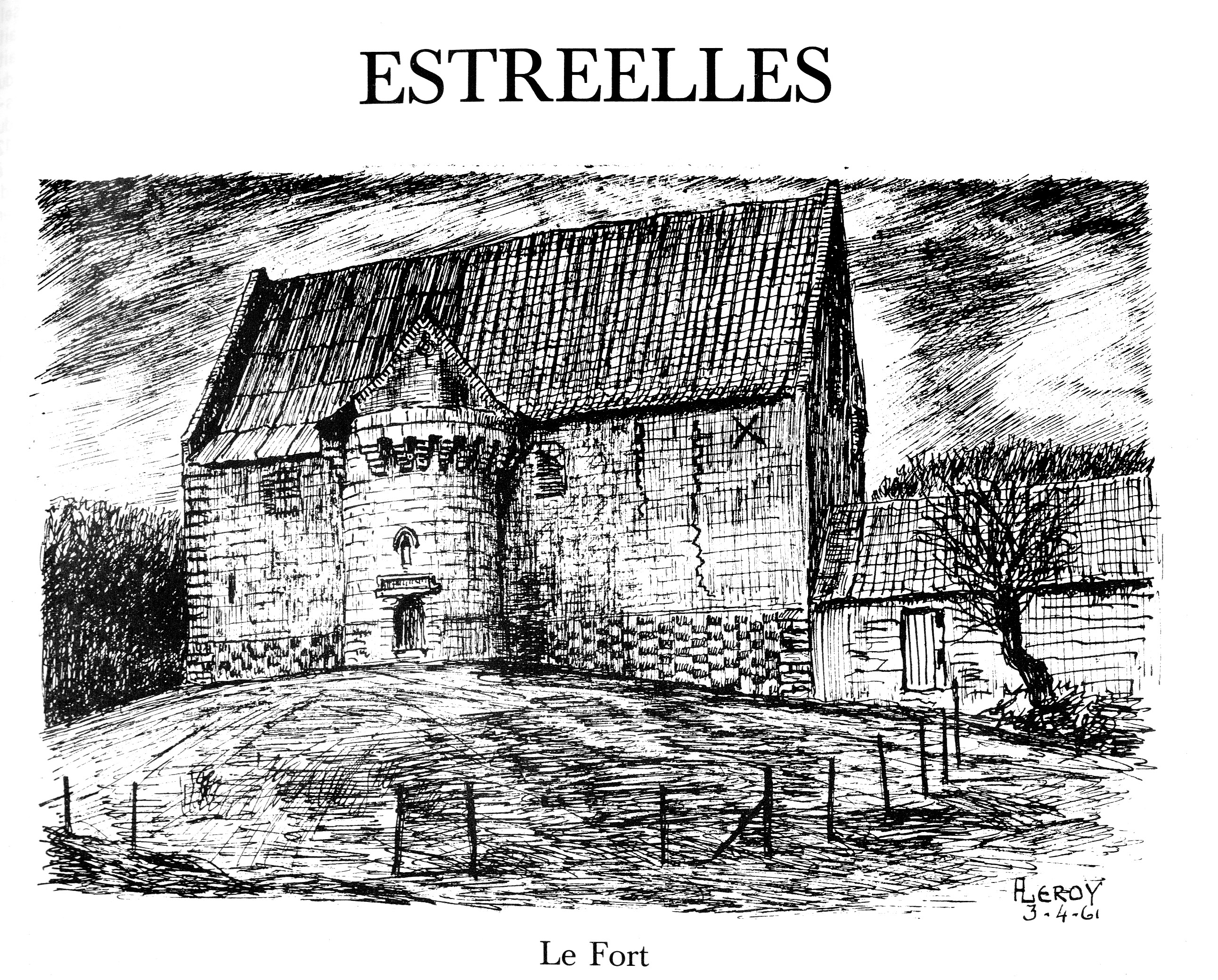
An artist's impression

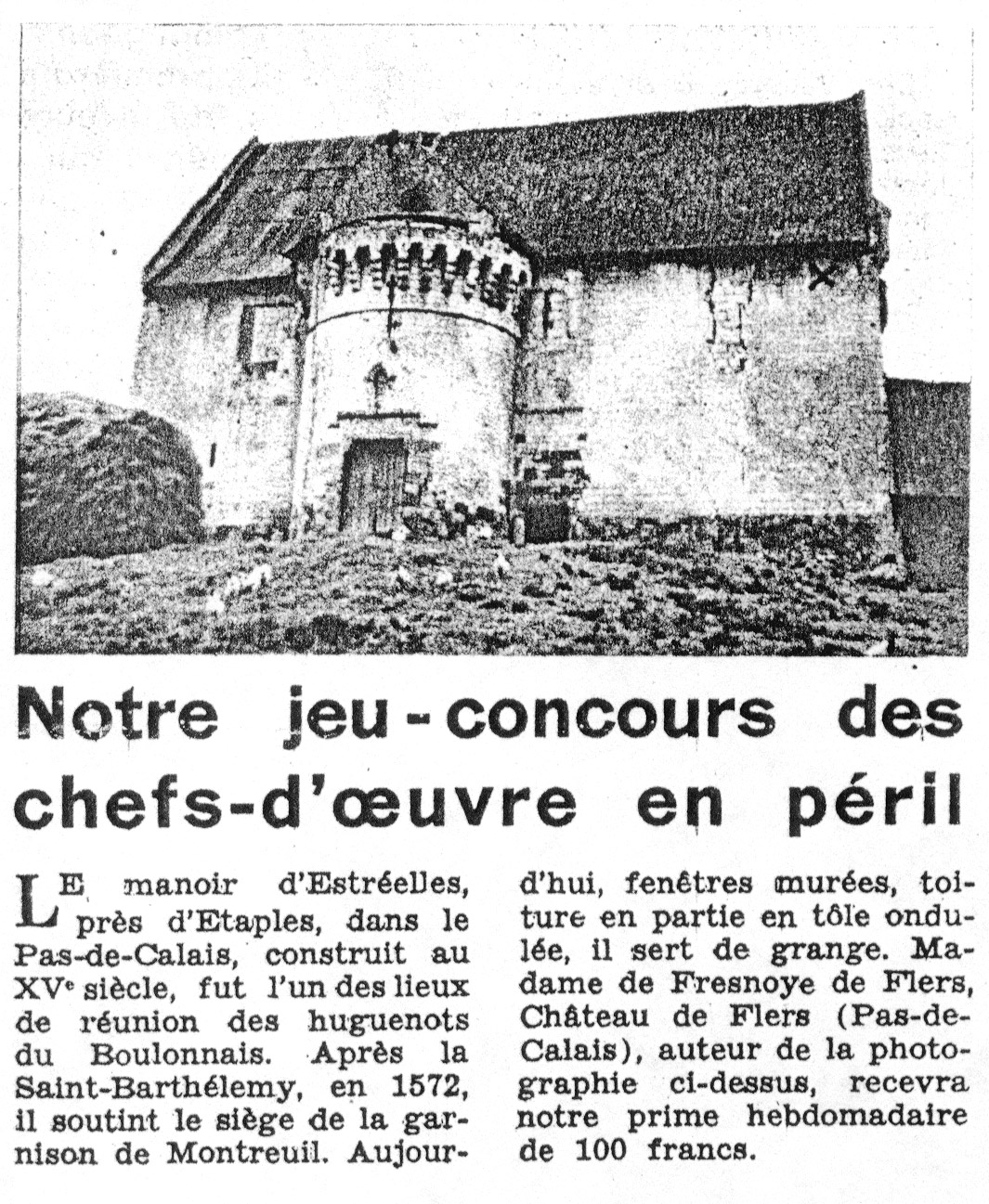
Newspaper article

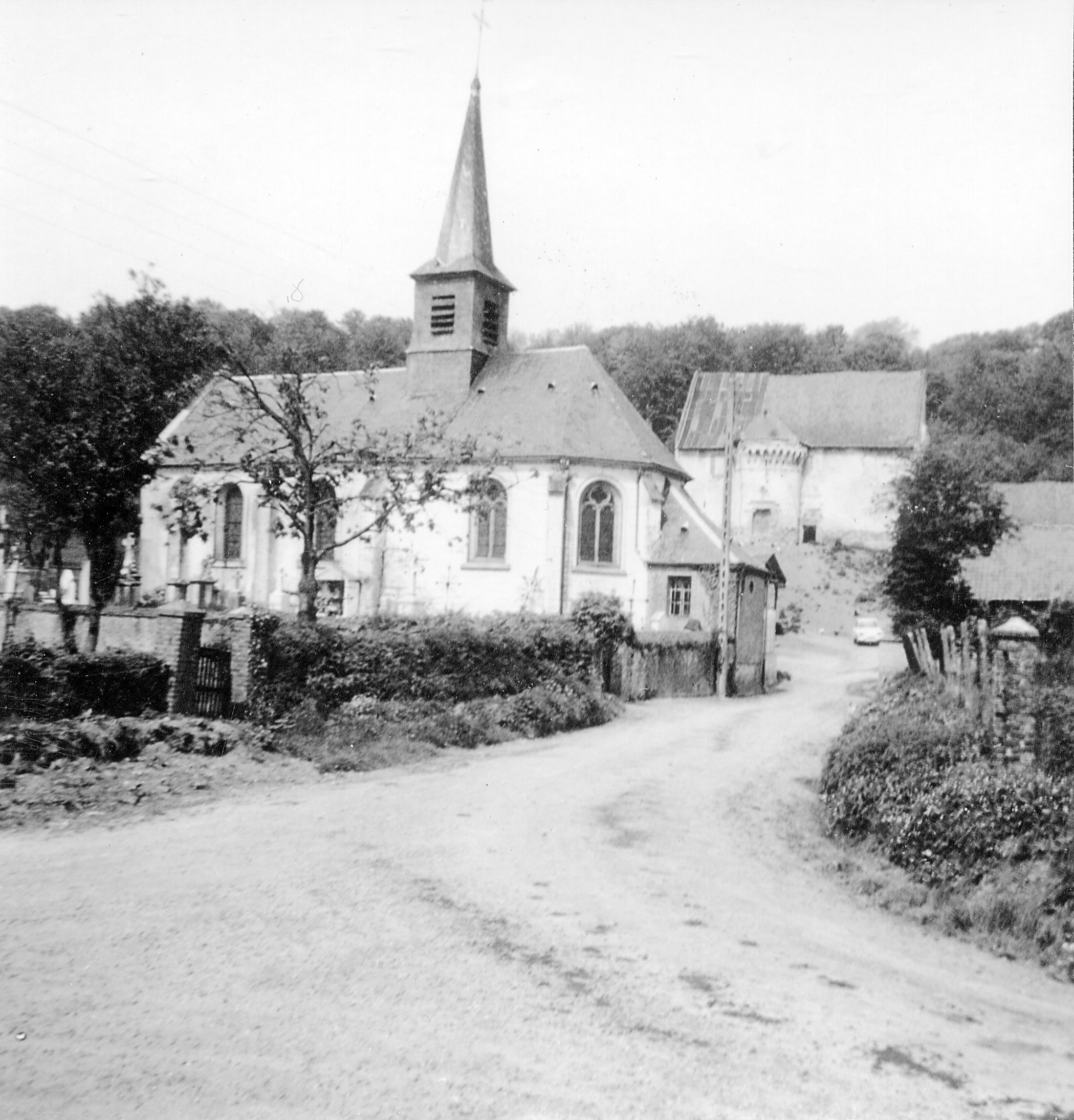
The village church

== See also ==
- Communes of the Pas-de-Calais department
