= Écuires =

Écuires Schuren
- Commune
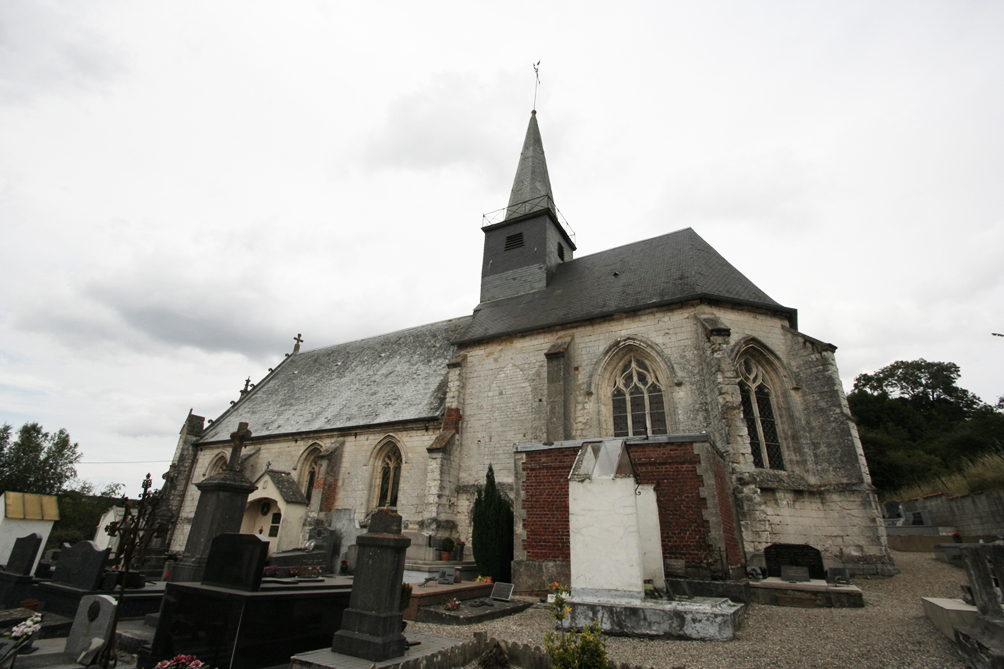
- The church of Écuires

- Coat of arms
- Location of Écuires
- Location within France Location within Hauts-de-France
- Coordinates: 50°26′50″N 1°45′43″E
- Country: France
- Region: Hauts-de-France
- Department: Pas-de-Calais
- Arrondissement: Montreuil
- Canton: Berck
- Intercommunality: CA Deux Baies en Montreuillois

Government
  - Mayor (2020–2026): Philippe Cousin
- Area^{1}: 9.15 km^{2} (3.53 sq mi)
- Elevation: 15 m (49 ft)
- Highest elevation: 65 m (213 ft)
- Lowest elevation: 5 m (16 ft)
- Population (2023): 682
  - Density: 74.5/km^{2} (193/sq mi)
- Time zone: UTC+01:00 (CET)
  - Summer (DST): UTC+02:00 (CEST)
- INSEE/Postal code: 62289 /62170
- ^{1} French Land Register data, which excludes lakes, ponds, glaciers > 1 km^{2} (0.386 sq mi or 247 acres) and river estuaries.

Écuires (French pronunciation: [ekɥiʁ]; West Flemish: Schuren) is a commune in the Pas-de-Calais department in the Hauts-de-France region of France outside Montreuil-sur-Mer.

== Population ==
Historical population
Year	Pop.	±% p.a.
1968	586	—
1975	670	+1.93%
1982	795	+2.47%
1990	878	+1.25%
1999	830	−0.62%
2007	782	−0.74%
2012	779	−0.08%
2017	717	−1.65%
2023	682	−0.83%
Source: INSEE

== See also ==
- Communes of the Pas-de-Calais department
