= La Madelaine-sous-Montreuil =

- Commune
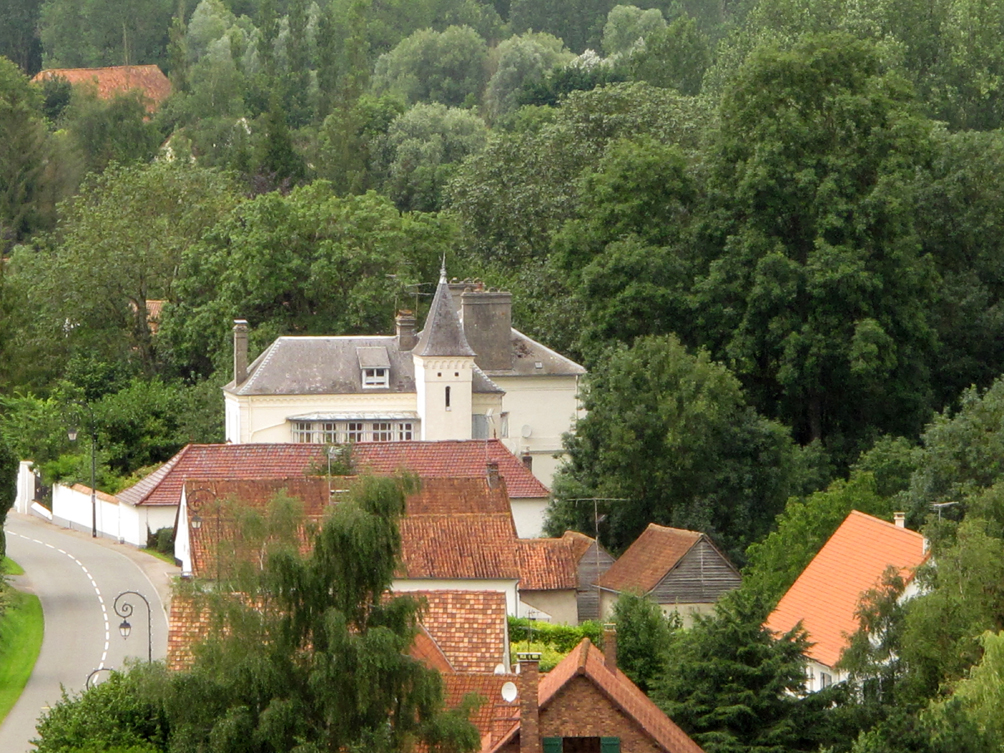
- A view of the chateau of La Madelaine

- Coat of arms
- Location of La Madelaine-sous-Montreuil
- Location within France Location within Hauts-de-France
- Coordinates: 50°28′10″N 1°45′00″E
- Country: France
- Region: Hauts-de-France
- Department: Pas-de-Calais
- Arrondissement: Montreuil
- Canton: Berck
- Intercommunality: CA Deux Baies en Montreuillois

Government
  - Mayor (2020–2026): Jean-François Roussel
- Area^{1}: 2.46 km^{2} (0.95 sq mi)
- Elevation: 5 m (16 ft)
- Highest elevation: 50 m (160 ft)
- Lowest elevation: 2 m (6.6 ft)
- Population (2023): 149
  - Density: 60.6/km^{2} (157/sq mi)
- Time zone: UTC+01:00 (CET)
  - Summer (DST): UTC+02:00 (CEST)
- INSEE/Postal code: 62535 /62170
- ^{1} French Land Register data, which excludes lakes, ponds, glaciers > 1 km^{2} (0.386 sq mi or 247 acres) and river estuaries.

La Madelaine-sous-Montreuil (French pronunciation: [la madlɛn su mɔ̃tʁœj], literally La Madelaine under Montreuil; Picard: El Madelaine-dsou-Montreu) is a commune in the Pas-de-Calais department in the Hauts-de-France region of France.

== Geography ==
La Madelaine-sous-Montreuil is situated adjacent to the northwest of Montreuil-sur-Mer on the D139 road and by the banks of the Canche river.

== Population ==
Historical population
Year	Pop.	±% p.a.
1968	124	—
1975	136	+1.33%
1982	139	+0.31%
1990	147	+0.70%
1999	156	+0.66%
2007	169	+1.01%
2012	172	+0.35%
2017	161	−1.31%
2023	149	−1.28%
Source: INSEE

== See also ==
- Communes of the Pas-de-Calais department
