= Campigneulles-les-Petites =

- Commune
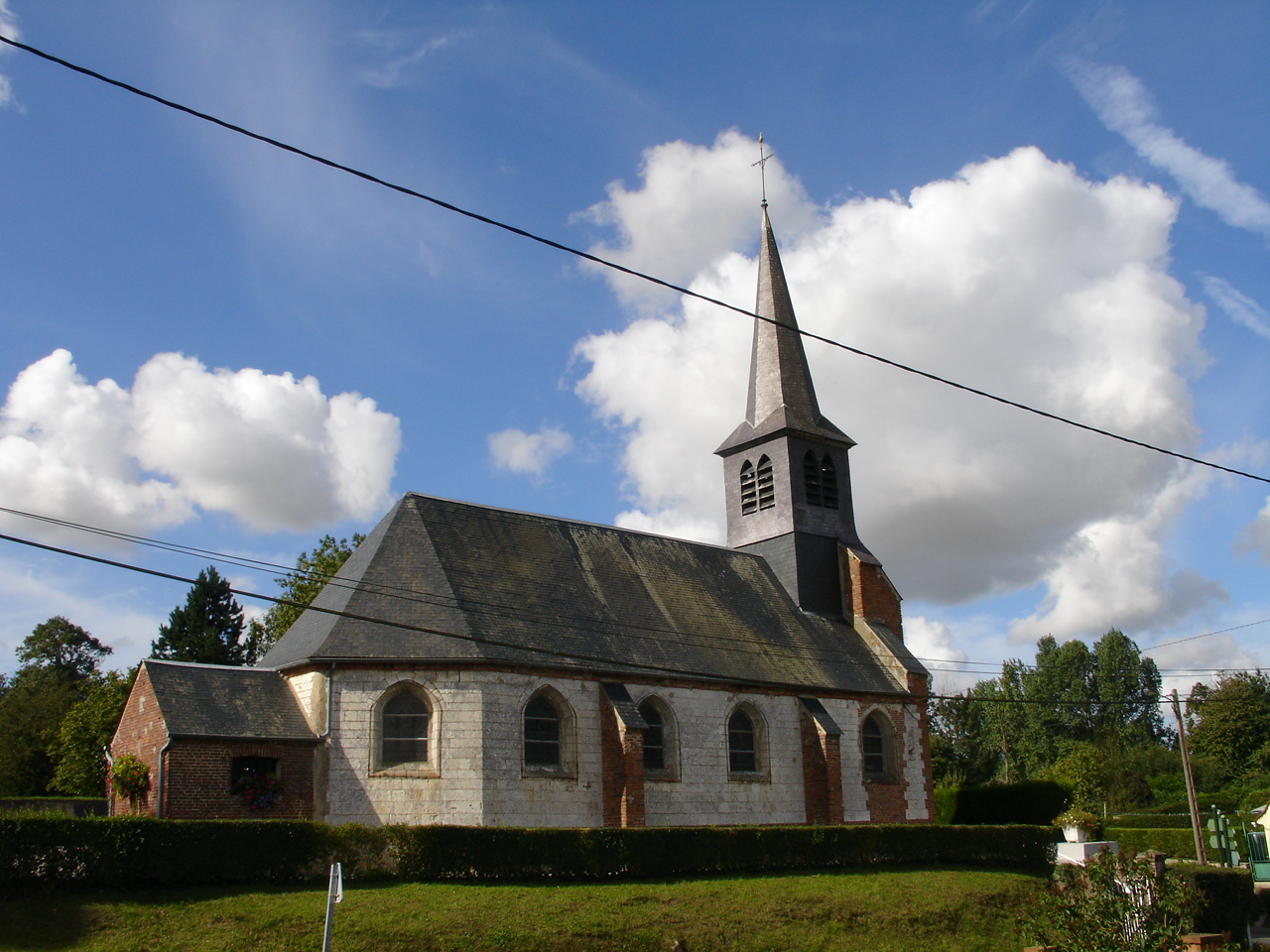
- The church of Campigneulles-les-Petites

- Coat of arms
- Location of Campigneulles-les-Petites
- Location within France Location within Hauts-de-France
- Coordinates: 50°26′46″N 1°44′03″E
- Country: France
- Region: Hauts-de-France
- Department: Pas-de-Calais
- Arrondissement: Montreuil
- Canton: Berck
- Intercommunality: CA Deux Baies en Montreuillois

Government
  - Mayor (2020–2026): Jean-Claude Allexandre
- Area^{1}: 6.19 km^{2} (2.39 sq mi)
- Elevation: 51 m (167 ft)
- Highest elevation: 67 m (220 ft)
- Lowest elevation: 15 m (49 ft)
- Population (2023): 521
  - Density: 84.2/km^{2} (218/sq mi)
- Time zone: UTC+01:00 (CET)
  - Summer (DST): UTC+02:00 (CEST)
- INSEE/Postal code: 62207 /62170
- ^{1} French Land Register data, which excludes lakes, ponds, glaciers > 1 km^{2} (0.386 sq mi or 247 acres) and river estuaries.

Campigneulles-les-Petites (French pronunciation: [kɑ̃piɲœl le pətit]) is a commune in the Pas-de-Calais department in the Hauts-de-France region of France.

== Geography ==
A village situated some 2 miles (3 km) southwest of Montreuil-sur-Mer on the D917 road.

== Population ==
Historical population
Year	Pop.	±% p.a.
1968	200	—
1975	266	+4.16%
1982	539	+10.62%
1990	515	−0.57%
1999	517	+0.04%
2007	587	+1.60%
2012	578	−0.31%
2017	552	−0.92%
2023	521	−0.96%
Source: INSEE

== See also ==
- Communes of the Pas-de-Calais department
