= Campigneulles-les-Grandes =

- Commune
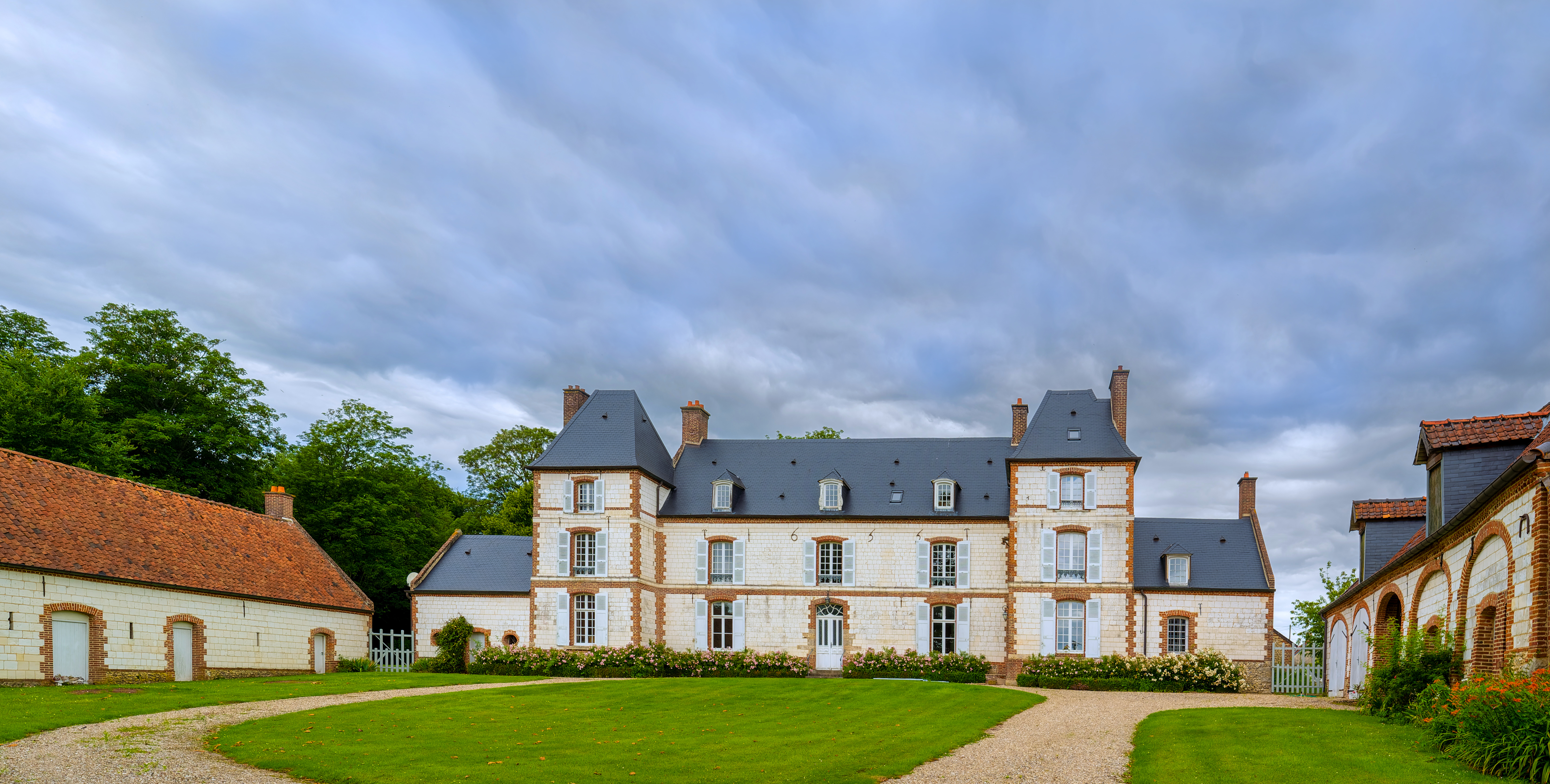
- The castle of Campigneulles-les-Grandes

- Coat of arms
- Location of Campigneulles-les-Grandes
- Location within France Location within Hauts-de-France
- Coordinates: 50°26′11″N 1°42′51″E
- Country: France
- Region: Hauts-de-France
- Department: Pas-de-Calais
- Arrondissement: Montreuil
- Canton: Berck
- Intercommunality: CA Deux Baies en Montreuillois

Government
  - Mayor (2020–2026): Hubert Douay
- Area^{1}: 5.34 km^{2} (2.06 sq mi)
- Elevation: 51 m (167 ft)
- Highest elevation: 61.9 m (203 ft)
- Lowest elevation: 23 m (75 ft)
- Population (2023): 295
  - Density: 55.2/km^{2} (143/sq mi)
- Time zone: UTC+01:00 (CET)
  - Summer (DST): UTC+02:00 (CEST)
- INSEE/Postal code: 62206 /62170
- ^{1} French Land Register data, which excludes lakes, ponds, glaciers > 1 km^{2} (0.386 sq mi or 247 acres) and river estuaries.

Campigneulles-les-Grandes (French pronunciation: [kɑ̃piɲœl le ɡʁɑ̃d]) is a commune in the Pas-de-Calais department in the Hauts-de-France region of France.

== Geography ==
A village situated some 3 miles (5 km) southwest of Montreuil-sur-Mer on the D917 road.

== Population ==
Historical population
Year	Pop.	±% p.a.
1968	177	—
1975	167	−0.83%
1982	175	+0.67%
1990	221	+2.96%
1999	256	+1.65%
2007	270	+0.67%
2012	325	+3.78%
2017	299	−1.65%
2023	295	−0.22%
Source: INSEE

== See also ==
- Communes of the Pas-de-Calais department
