= Lépine, Pas-de-Calais =

Lépine
- Commune
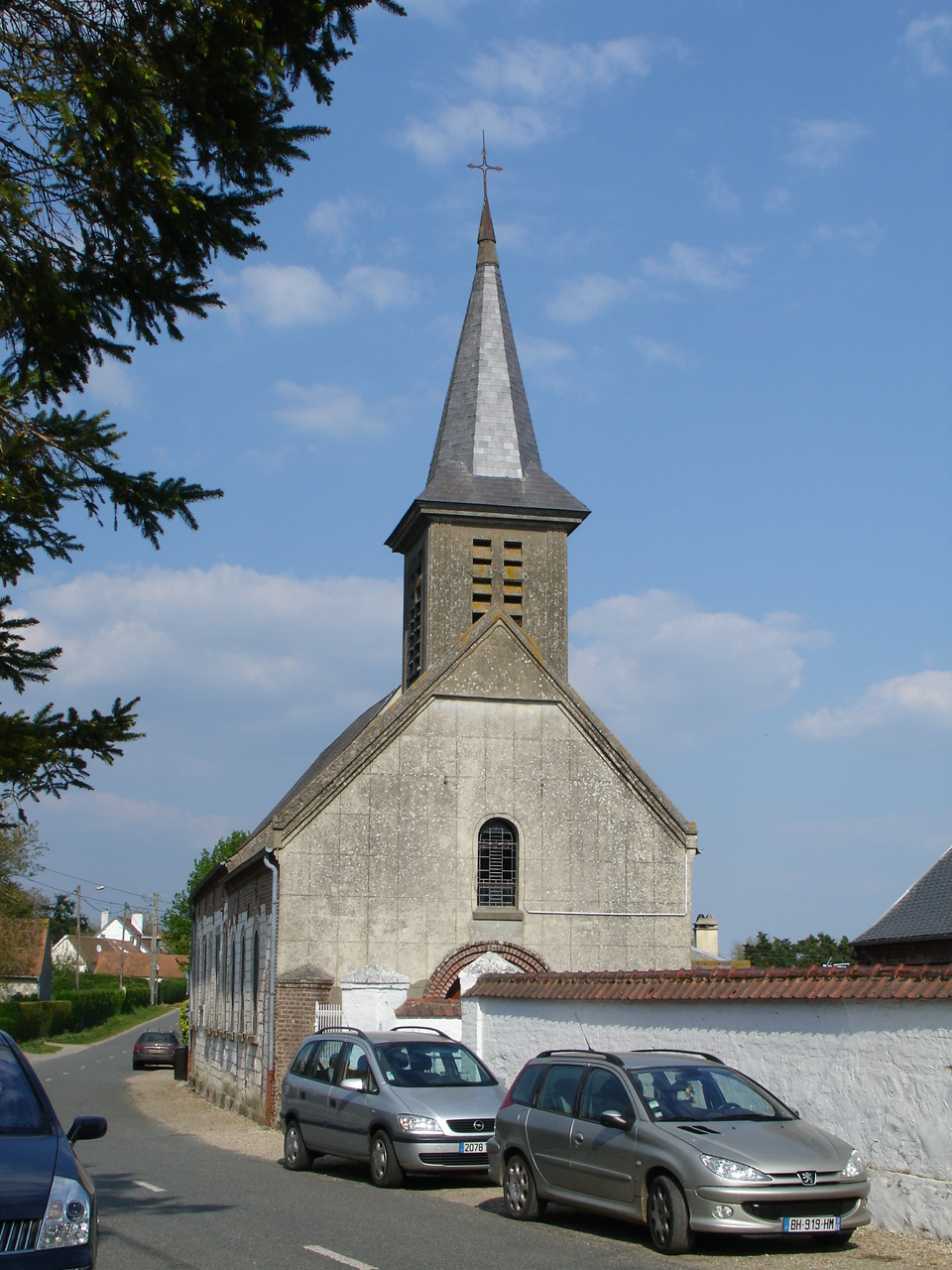
- The church of Lépine

- Coat of arms
- Location of Lépine
- Location within France Location within Hauts-de-France
- Coordinates: 50°22′43″N 1°43′37″E
- Country: France
- Region: Hauts-de-France
- Department: Pas-de-Calais
- Arrondissement: Montreuil
- Canton: Berck
- Intercommunality: CA Deux Baies en Montreuillois

Government
  - Mayor (2020–2026): Benoit Rouzé
- Area^{1}: 10.82 km^{2} (4.18 sq mi)
- Elevation: 46 m (151 ft)
- Highest elevation: 59 m (194 ft)
- Lowest elevation: 3 m (9.8 ft)
- Population (2023): 291
  - Density: 26.9/km^{2} (69.7/sq mi)
- Time zone: UTC+01:00 (CET)
  - Summer (DST): UTC+02:00 (CEST)
- INSEE/Postal code: 62499 /62170
- ^{1} French Land Register data, which excludes lakes, ponds, glaciers > 1 km^{2} (0.386 sq mi or 247 acres) and river estuaries.

Lépine (French pronunciation: [lepin]) is a commune in the Pas-de-Calais department in the Hauts-de-France region of France.

== Geography ==
Lépine is situated 6 miles (9 km) south of Montreuil-sur-Mer, just off the N1 on the D140 road.

== Population ==
Historical population
Year	Pop.	±% p.a.
1968	319	—
1975	268	−2.46%
1982	279	+0.58%
1990	296	+0.74%
1999	297	+0.04%
2007	282	−0.65%
2012	278	−0.29%
2017	273	−0.36%
2023	291	+1.07%
Source: INSEE

== Places of interest ==
- The fifteenth century church of the Nativité-de-Notre-Dame.
- Château du Puits-Bérault, dating from the nineteenth century.

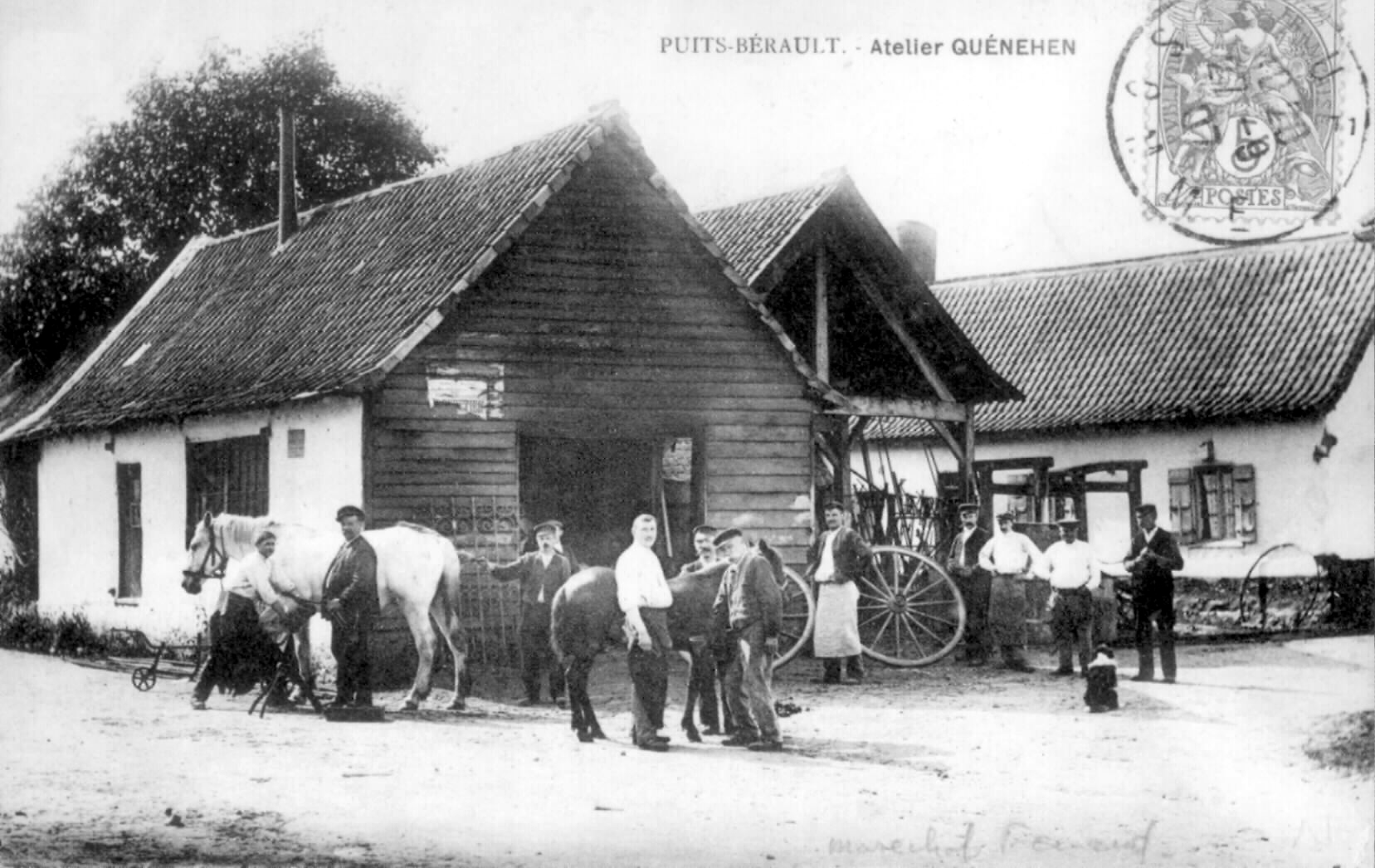
The farrier's yard at Puits-Bérault, around 1905.

== See also ==
- Communes of the Pas-de-Calais department
