= Sorrus =

- Commune
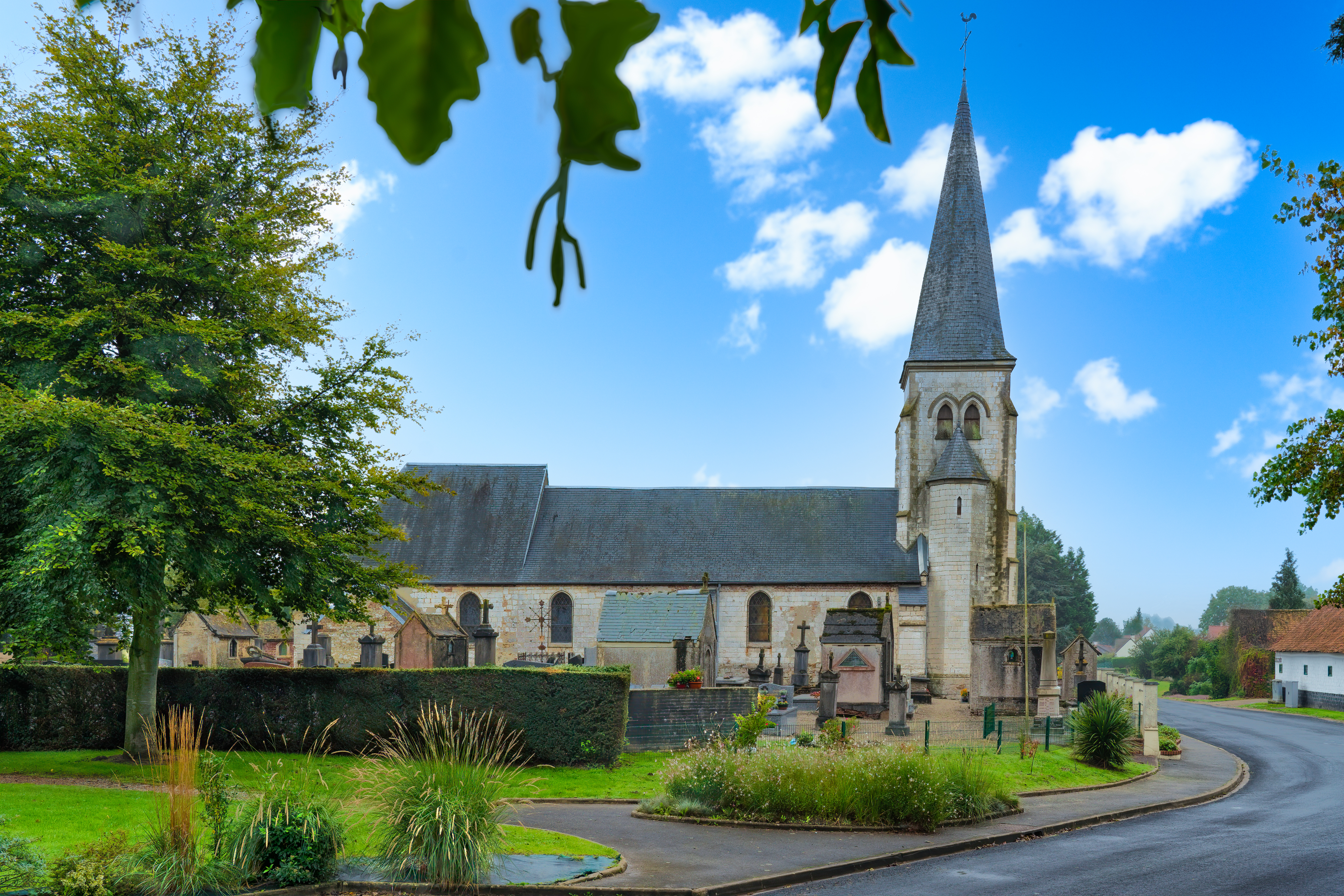
- The church of Sorrus

- Coat of arms
- Location of Sorrus
- Location within France Location within Hauts-de-France
- Coordinates: 50°27′34″N 1°43′25″E
- Country: France
- Region: Hauts-de-France
- Department: Pas-de-Calais
- Arrondissement: Montreuil
- Canton: Berck
- Intercommunality: CA Deux Baies en Montreuillois

Government
  - Mayor (2020–2026): Jacques Flahaut
- Area^{1}: 6.79 km^{2} (2.62 sq mi)
- Elevation: 45 m (148 ft)
- Highest elevation: 62 m (203 ft)
- Lowest elevation: 21 m (69 ft)
- Population (2023): 942
  - Density: 139/km^{2} (359/sq mi)
- Time zone: UTC+01:00 (CET)
  - Summer (DST): UTC+02:00 (CEST)
- INSEE/Postal code: 62799 /62170
- ^{1} French Land Register data, which excludes lakes, ponds, glaciers > 1 km^{2} (0.386 sq mi or 247 acres) and river estuaries.

Sorrus is a commune in the Pas-de-Calais department in the Hauts-de-France region of France.

== Geography ==
Sorrus lies 2 miles (3 km) west of Montreuil-sur-Mer at the junction of the D144 and the D145 roads.

== Population ==
Historical population
Year	Pop.	±% p.a.
1968	296	—
1975	284	−0.59%
1982	349	+2.99%
1990	473	+3.87%
1999	472	−0.02%
2007	607	+3.19%
2012	685	+2.45%
2017	817	+3.59%
2023	942	+2.40%
Source: INSEE

== Places of interest ==
- The church of St.Riqiuer, dating from the sixteenth century
- Traces of the 16th century Château-Bleu.
- The nineteenth century Château de la Bruyère.

== See also ==
- Communes of the Pas-de-Calais department
