= Recques-sur-Course =

Recques-sur-Course Rekke
- Commune
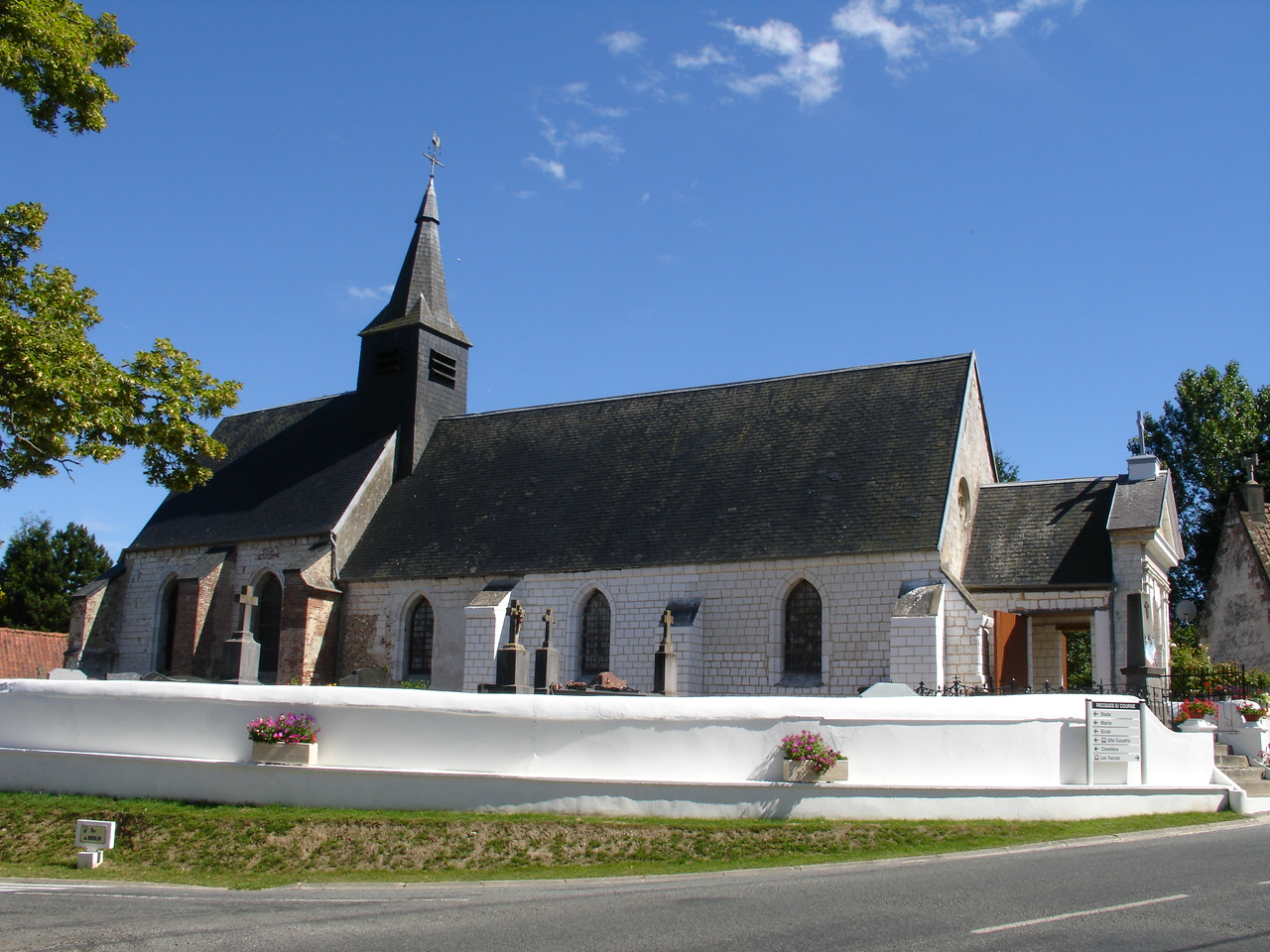
- The church of Recques-sur-Course

- Coat of arms
- Location of Recques-sur-Course
- Location within France Location within Hauts-de-France
- Coordinates: 50°31′18″N 1°47′05″E
- Country: France
- Region: Hauts-de-France
- Department: Pas-de-Calais
- Arrondissement: Montreuil
- Canton: Berck
- Intercommunality: CA Deux Baies en Montreuillois

Government
  - Mayor (2020–2026): Maryse Jumez
- Area^{1}: 4.83 km^{2} (1.86 sq mi)
- Elevation: 54 m (177 ft)
- Highest elevation: 103 m (338 ft)
- Lowest elevation: 14 m (46 ft)
- Population (2023): 266
  - Density: 55.1/km^{2} (143/sq mi)
- Time zone: UTC+01:00 (CET)
  - Summer (DST): UTC+02:00 (CEST)
- INSEE/Postal code: 62698 /62170
- ^{1} French Land Register data, which excludes lakes, ponds, glaciers > 1 km^{2} (0.386 sq mi or 247 acres) and river estuaries.

Recques-sur-Course (French pronunciation: [ʁɛk syʁ kuʁs]; West Flemish: Rekke) is a commune in the Pas-de-Calais department in the Hauts-de-France region of France 6 km (3.7 mi) north of Montreuil-sur-Mer by the banks of the Course river.

== Population ==
Historical population
Year	Pop.	±% p.a.
1968	186	—
1975	172	−1.11%
1982	191	+1.51%
1990	267	+4.28%
1999	292	+1.00%
2007	272	−0.88%
2012	278	+0.44%
2017	279	+0.07%
2023	266	−0.79%
Source: INSEE

== See also ==
- Communes of the Pas-de-Calais department
