= Beaumerie-Saint-Martin =

- Commune
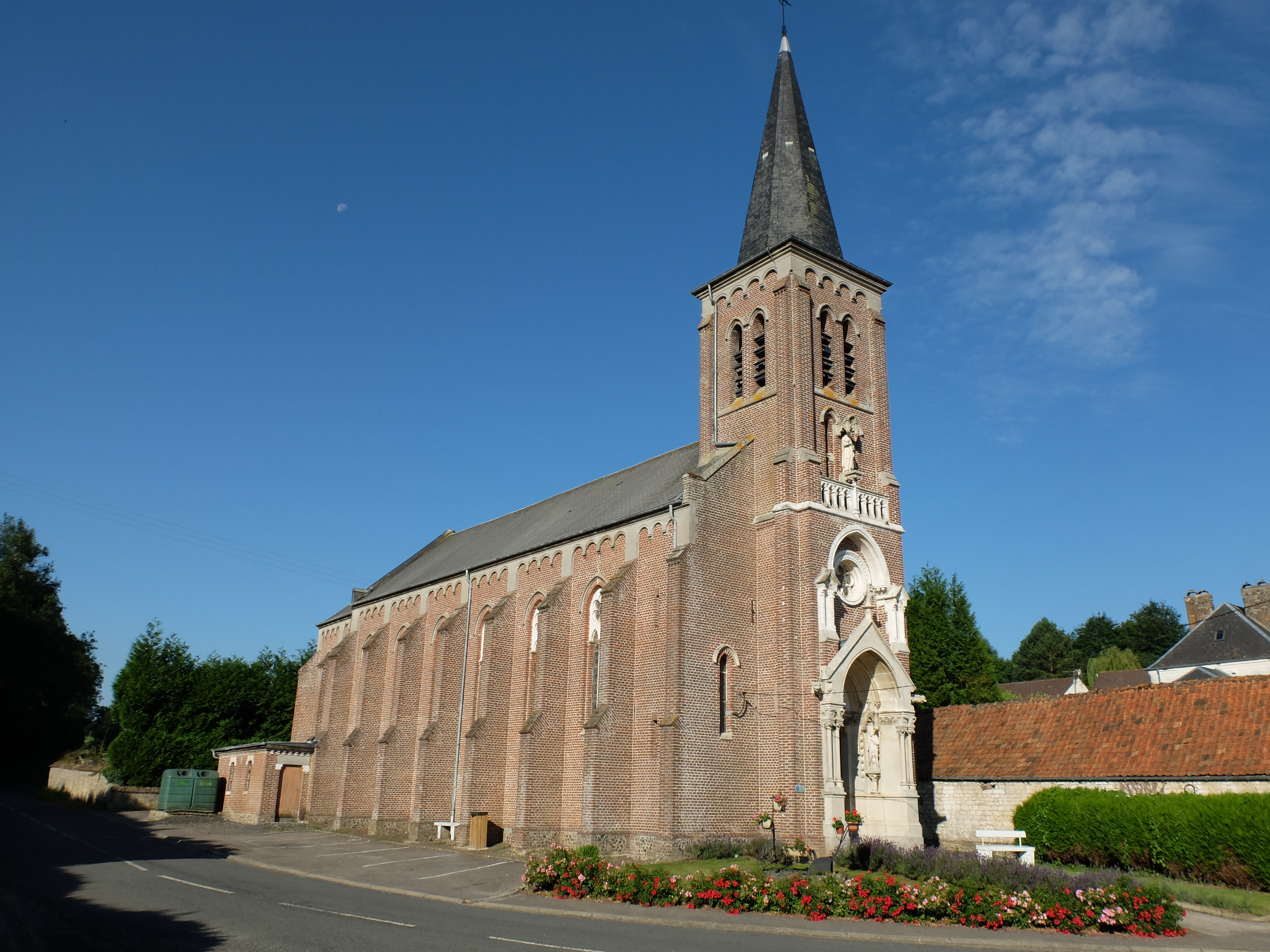
- The church of Beaumerie-Saint-Martin

- Coat of arms
- Location of Beaumerie-Saint-Martin
- Location within France Location within Hauts-de-France
- Coordinates: 50°27′23″N 1°47′57″E
- Country: France
- Region: Hauts-de-France
- Department: Pas-de-Calais
- Arrondissement: Montreuil
- Canton: Berck
- Intercommunality: CA Deux Baies en Montreuillois

Government
  - Mayor (2020–2026): Patrick Herlange
- Area^{1}: 9.37 km^{2} (3.62 sq mi)
- Elevation: 850 m (2,790 ft)
- Highest elevation: 73 m (240 ft)
- Lowest elevation: 3 m (9.8 ft)
- Population (2023): 379
  - Density: 40.4/km^{2} (105/sq mi)
- Time zone: UTC+01:00 (CET)
  - Summer (DST): UTC+02:00 (CEST)
- INSEE/Postal code: 62094 /62170
- ^{1} French Land Register data, which excludes lakes, ponds, glaciers > 1 km^{2} (0.386 sq mi or 247 acres) and river estuaries.

Beaumerie-Saint-Martin (French pronunciation: [bomʁi sɛ̃ maʁtɛ̃]; Picard: Bieumerie-Saint-Martin) is a commune in the Pas-de-Calais department in the Hauts-de-France region in northern France.

== Geography ==
A village situated some 1.5 miles (3 km) southeast of Montreuil-sur-Mer, on the D349 road.

== Population ==
Historical population
Year	Pop.	±% p.a.
1968	306	—
1975	263	−2.14%
1982	296	+1.70%
1990	309	+0.54%
1999	318	+0.32%
2007	355	+1.39%
2012	394	+2.11%
2017	397	+0.15%
2023	379	−0.77%
Source: INSEE

== See also ==
- Communes of the Pas-de-Calais department
