= Communauté de communes de l'Hesdinois =

Coordinates: 50.3742°N 2.0367°E

Hesdinois
- Former communauté de communes
- Interactive map of Hesdinois
- Country: France
- Region: Hauts-de-France
- Department: Pas-de-Calais
- No. of communes: {{{nbcomm}}}
- Established: 2002
- Disbanded: 2014
- Population (1999): 14,805

The Communauté de communes de l'Hesdinois was located in the Pas-de-Calais département, in northern France. It was created in January 2002. It was merged into the new Communauté de communes des 7 Vallées in January 2014.

== Composition ==
It comprised the following 27 communes:

1. Aubin-Saint-Vaast
2. Auchy-lès-Hesdin
3. Bouin-Plumoison
4. Brévillers
5. Capelle-lès-Hesdin
6. Caumont
7. Cavron-Saint-Martin
8. Chériennes
9. Contes
10. Grigny
11. Guigny
12. Guisy
13. Hesdin
14. Huby-Saint-Leu
15. La Loge
16. Labroye
17. Le Parcq
18. Le Quesnoy-en-Artois
19. Marconne
20. Marconnelle
21. Mouriez
22. Raye-sur-Authie
23. Regnauville
24. Sainte-Austreberthe
25. Tortefontaine
26. Wambercourt
27. Wamin
