= Bras de Bronne =

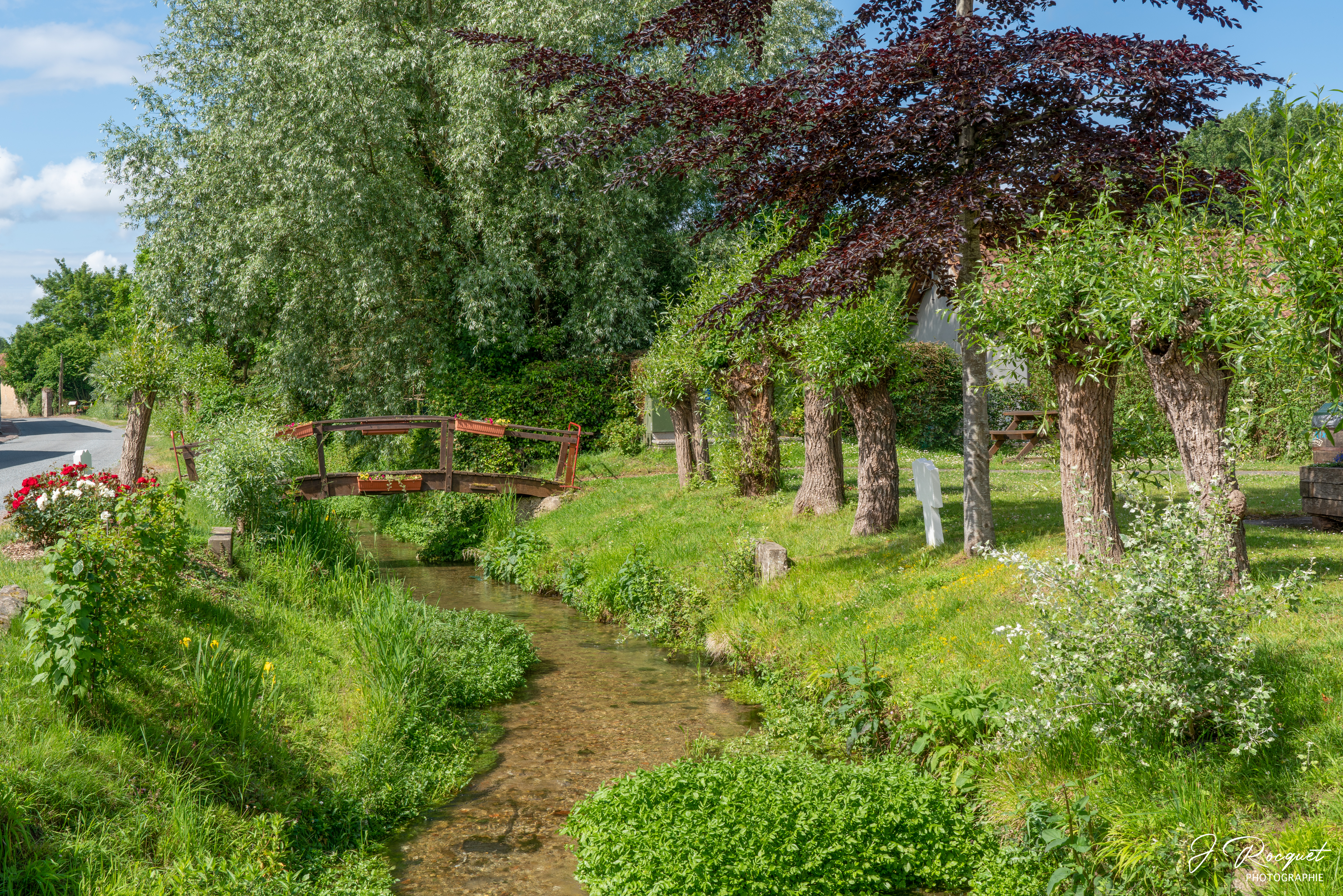

- Location within France Location within Hauts-de-France

Location
- Country: France

Physical characteristics
- Source
  - location: Artois
- Mouth
  - location: Canche
  - coordinates: 50°27′9″N 1°49′14″E
- Length: 11 km (6.8 mi)

Basin features
- Progression: Canche→ English Channel

The Bras de Bronne (French pronunciation: [bʁa də bʁɔn]; sometimes spelled Bras de Brosne) is a small river in northern France whose 10.8 km (6.7 mi) course crosses the departement of the Pas-de-Calais. Its source is at the hamlet of Etreuille, near the village of Saint-Michel-sous-Bois. It flows through the communes of Humbert, Sempy, Aix-en-Issart, Marant, Marenla and joins the river Canche at Marles-sur-Canche.
In winter, it is fed by an even smaller river at the commune of Quilen.
There's an ancient watermill at Sempy.
