= Incourt =

Incourt may refer to:

- Incourt, Belgium, a municipality in the province of Walloon Brabant
- Incourt, Pas-de-Calais, a commune of the Pas-de-Calais department in northern France
