= Sempy =

- Commune
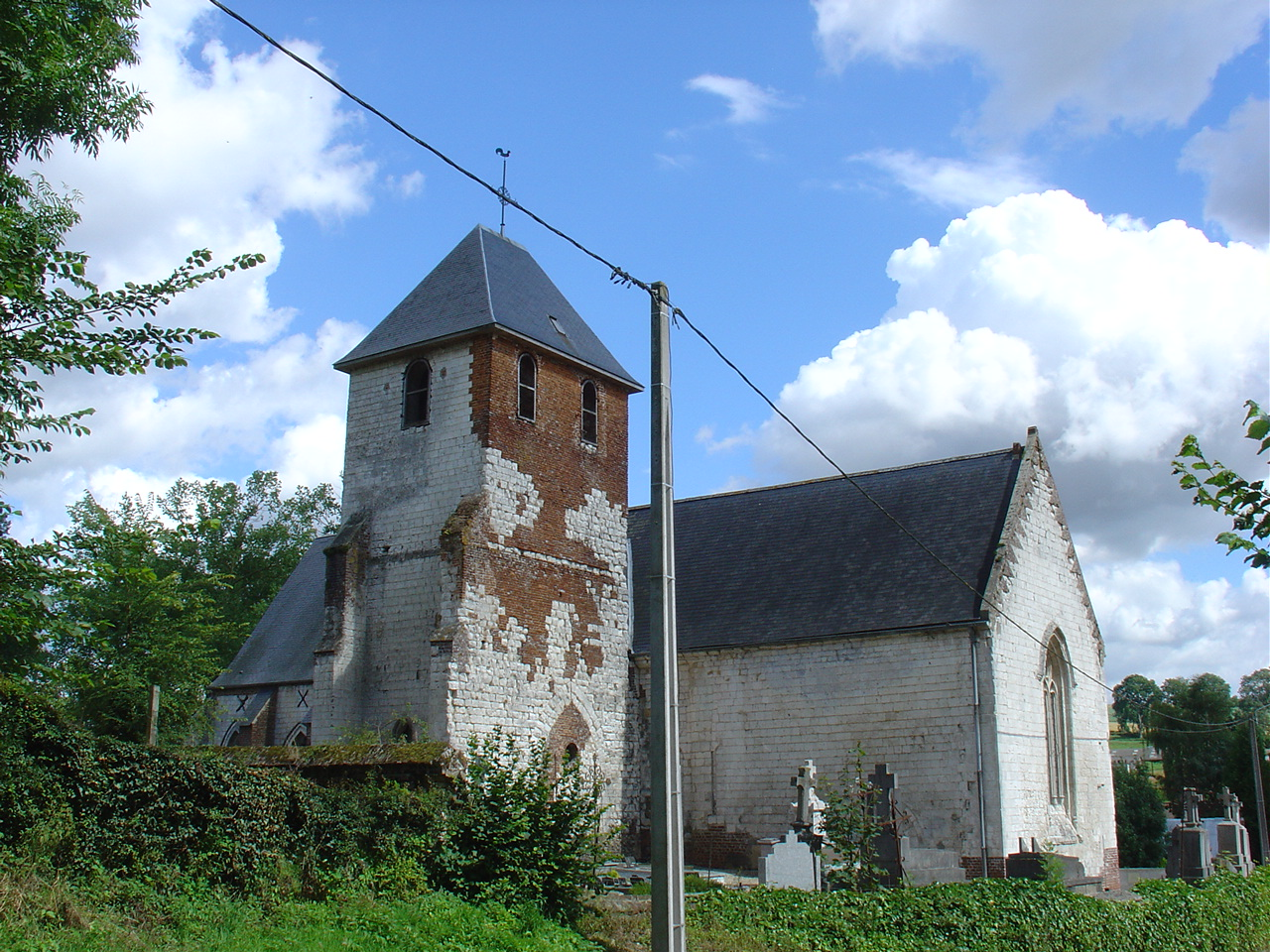
- The church of Sempy

- Coat of arms
- Location of Sempy
- Location within France Location within Hauts-de-France
- Coordinates: 50°29′38″N 1°52′44″E
- Country: France
- Region: Hauts-de-France
- Department: Pas-de-Calais
- Arrondissement: Montreuil
- Canton: Auxi-le-Château
- Intercommunality: CC des 7 Vallées

Government
  - Mayor (2020–2026): Pascal Widehem
- Area^{1}: 8 km^{2} (3.1 sq mi)
- Elevation: 41 m (135 ft)
- Highest elevation: 130 m (430 ft)
- Lowest elevation: 29 m (95 ft)
- Population (2023): 324
  - Density: 40/km^{2} (100/sq mi)
- Time zone: UTC+01:00 (CET)
  - Summer (DST): UTC+02:00 (CEST)
- INSEE/Postal code: 62787 /62170
- ^{1} French Land Register data, which excludes lakes, ponds, glaciers > 1 km^{2} (0.386 sq mi or 247 acres) and river estuaries.

Sempy (French pronunciation: [sɑ̃pi]) is a commune in the Pas-de-Calais department in the Hauts-de-France region of France.

== Geography ==
Sempy is located 4 miles (6 km) southeast of Montreuil-sur-Mer on the D129 road, alongside the banks of the small Bras de Bronne river.

== Population ==
Historical population
Year	Pop.	±% p.a.
1968	238	—
1975	229	−0.55%
1982	210	−1.23%
1990	176	−2.18%
1999	176	+0.00%
2007	254	+4.69%
2012	314	+4.33%
2017	325	+0.69%
2023	324	−0.05%
Source: INSEE

== Places of interest ==
- The church of St. Firmin, dating from the thirteenth century
- Traces of an ancient chateau.
- A watermill and a windmill.

== See also ==
- Communes of the Pas-de-Calais department
