= Noyelles-lès-Humières =

- Commune
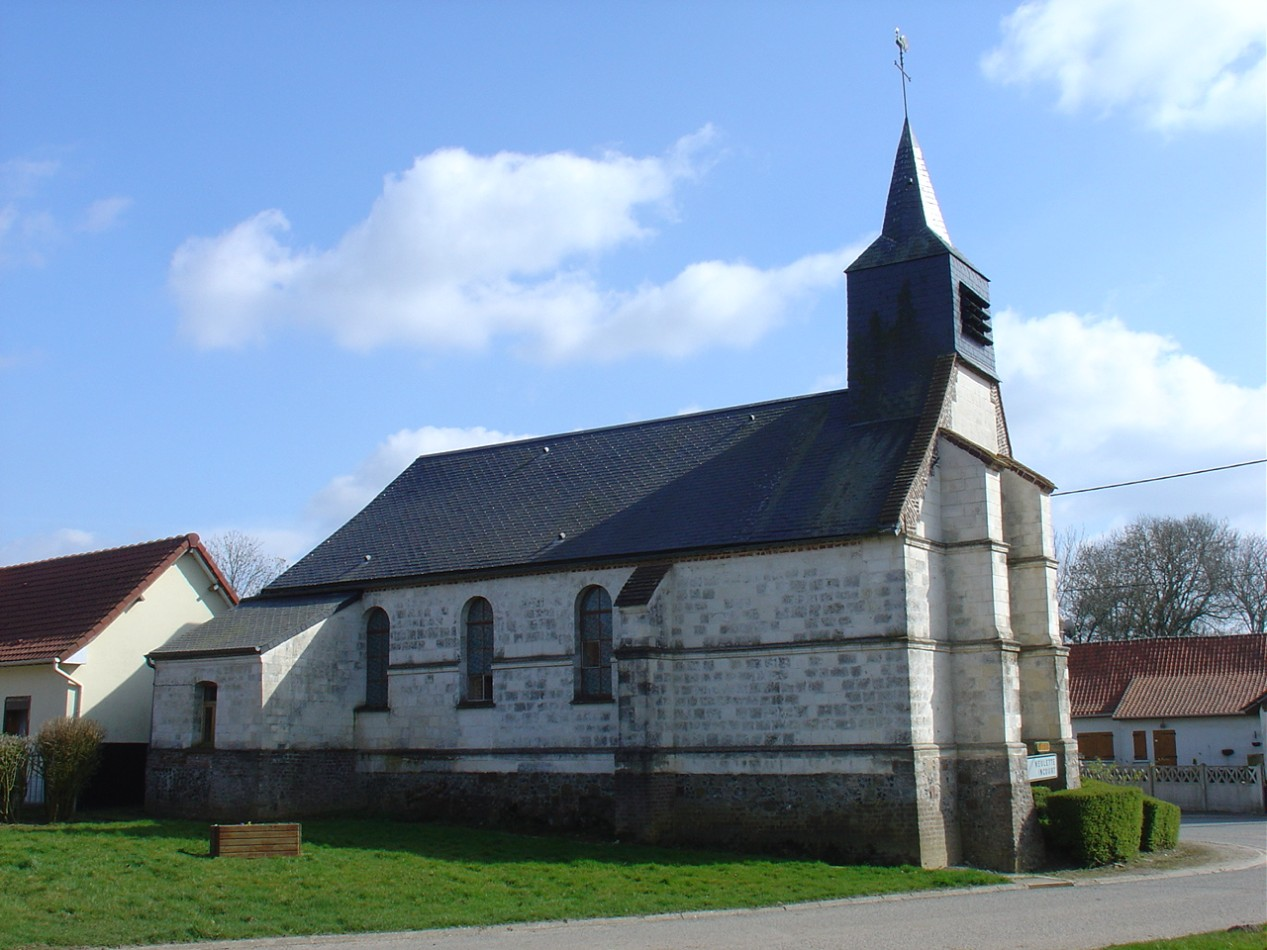
- The church of Noyelles-lès-Humières

- Coat of arms
- Location of Noyelles-lès-Humières
- Location within France Location within Hauts-de-France
- Coordinates: 50°22′28″N 2°10′36″E
- Country: France
- Region: Hauts-de-France
- Department: Pas-de-Calais
- Arrondissement: Montreuil
- Canton: Auxi-le-Château
- Intercommunality: CC des 7 Vallées

Government
  - Mayor (2020–2026): Jean-Claude Louchet
- Area^{1}: 1.16 km^{2} (0.45 sq mi)
- Elevation: 109 m (358 ft)
- Highest elevation: 112 m (367 ft)
- Lowest elevation: 95 m (312 ft)
- Population (2023): 56
  - Density: 48/km^{2} (130/sq mi)
- Time zone: UTC+01:00 (CET)
  - Summer (DST): UTC+02:00 (CEST)
- INSEE/Postal code: 62625 /62770
- ^{1} French Land Register data, which excludes lakes, ponds, glaciers > 1 km^{2} (0.386 sq mi or 247 acres) and river estuaries.

Noyelles-lès-Humières is a commune in the Pas-de-Calais department in the Hauts-de-France region of France about 20 miles (32 km) southeast of Montreuil-sur-Mern.

== Population ==
Historical population
| Year | Pop. | ±% p.a. |
|---|---|---|
| 1968 | 61 | — |
| 1975 | 50 | −2.80% |
| 1982 | 46 | −1.18% |
| 1990 | 57 | +2.72% |
| 1999 | 56 | −0.20% |
| 2007 | 66 | +2.08% |
| 2012 | 57 | −2.89% |
| 2017 | 53 | −1.44% |
| 2023 | 56 | +0.92% |
Source: INSEE

== See also ==
- Communes of the Pas-de-Calais department
