= Maresquel-Ecquemicourt =

- Commune
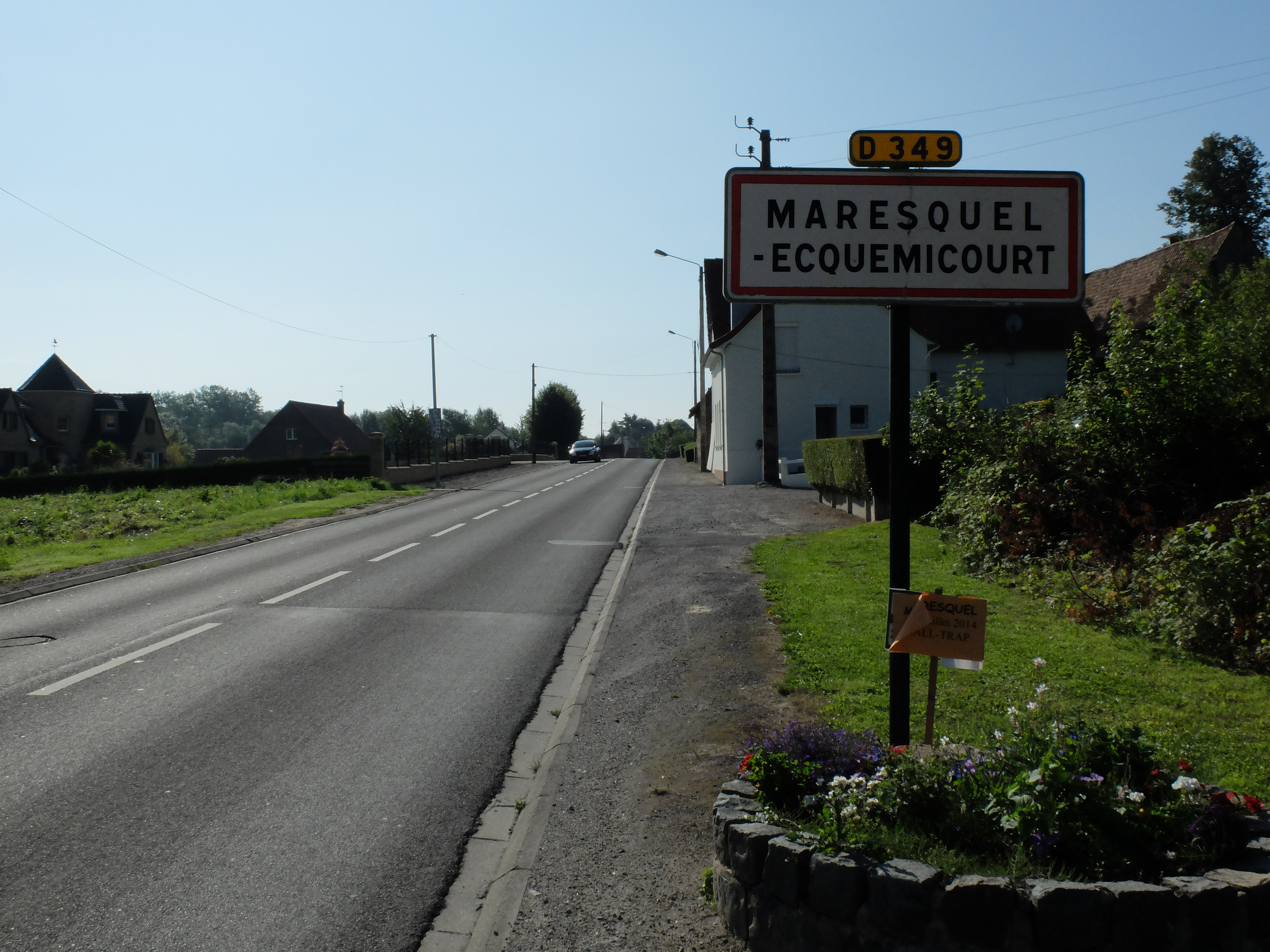
- The road into Maresquel-Ecquemicourt

- Coat of arms
- Location of Maresquel-Ecquemicourt
- Location within France Location within Hauts-de-France
- Coordinates: 50°24′40″N 1°55′41″E
- Country: France
- Region: Hauts-de-France
- Department: Pas-de-Calais
- Arrondissement: Montreuil
- Canton: Auxi-le-Château
- Intercommunality: CC des 7 Vallées

Government
  - Mayor (2020–2026): Lionel Leborgne
- Area^{1}: 7.89 km^{2} (3.05 sq mi)
- Elevation: 26 m (85 ft)
- Highest elevation: 104 m (341 ft)
- Lowest elevation: 13 m (43 ft)
- Population (2023): 1,070
  - Density: 136/km^{2} (351/sq mi)
- Time zone: UTC+01:00 (CET)
  - Summer (DST): UTC+02:00 (CEST)
- INSEE/Postal code: 62552 /62990
- ^{1} French Land Register data, which excludes lakes, ponds, glaciers > 1 km^{2} (0.386 sq mi or 247 acres) and river estuaries.

Maresquel-Ecquemicourt is a commune in the Pas-de-Calais department in the Hauts-de-France region of France.

== Geography ==
Maresquel-Ecquemicourt is situated 8 miles (13 km) southeast of Montreuil-sur-Mer, on the D349 road.

== Population ==
Historical population
Year	Pop.	±% p.a.
1968	934	—
1975	1,005	+1.05%
1982	1,037	+0.45%
1990	900	−1.76%
1999	847	−0.67%
2007	853	+0.09%
2012	913	+1.37%
2017	986	+1.55%
2023	1,070	+1.37%
Source: INSEE

== Places of interest ==
- The church of Saint-Pierre, dating from the seventeenth century.

== See also ==
- Communes of the Pas-de-Calais department
