= Béalencourt =

- Commune
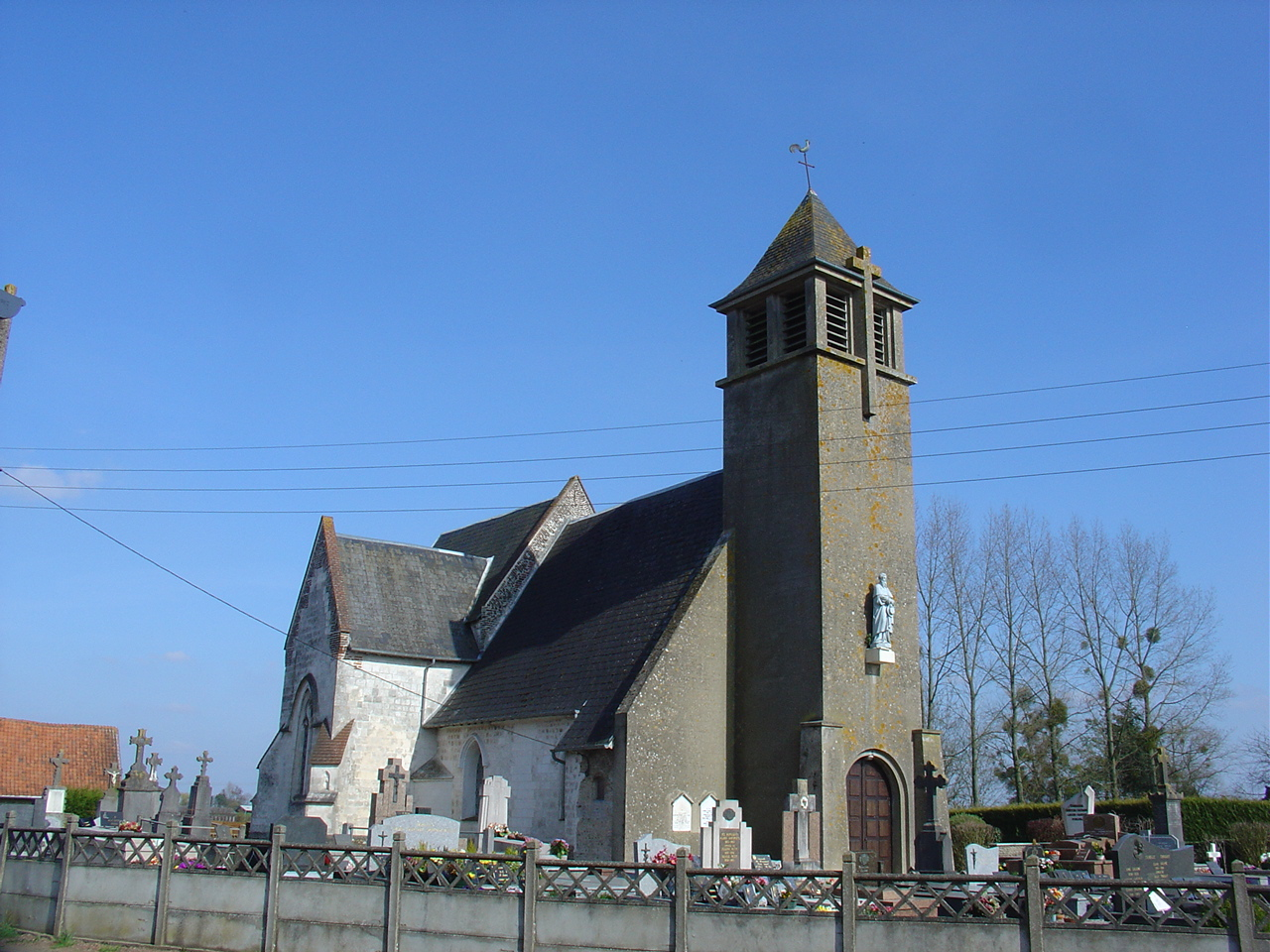
- The church of Béalencourt

- Coat of arms
- Location of Béalencourt
- Location within France Location within Hauts-de-France
- Coordinates: 50°26′07″N 2°07′20″E
- Country: France
- Region: Hauts-de-France
- Department: Pas-de-Calais
- Arrondissement: Montreuil
- Canton: Auxi-le-Château
- Intercommunality: CC des 7 Vallées

Government
  - Mayor (2020–2026): Benoît Théret
- Area^{1}: 7.31 km^{2} (2.82 sq mi)
- Elevation: 106 m (348 ft)
- Highest elevation: 124 m (407 ft)
- Lowest elevation: 55 m (180 ft)
- Population (2023): 139
  - Density: 19.0/km^{2} (49.2/sq mi)
- Time zone: UTC+01:00 (CET)
  - Summer (DST): UTC+02:00 (CEST)
- INSEE/Postal code: 62090 /62770
- ^{1} French Land Register data, which excludes lakes, ponds, glaciers > 1 km^{2} (0.386 sq mi or 247 acres) and river estuaries.

Béalencourt (French pronunciation: [bealɑ̃kuʁ]) is a commune in the Pas-de-Calais department in the Hauts-de-France region in northern France.

== Geography ==
A small village situated some 16 miles (26 km) east of Montreuil-sur-Mer, on the D107E road.

== Population ==
Historical population
Year	Pop.	±% p.a.
1968	185	—
1975	157	−2.32%
1982	193	+2.99%
1990	159	−2.39%
1999	135	−1.80%
2007	117	−1.77%
2012	122	+0.84%
2017	130	+1.28%
2023	139	+1.12%
Source: INSEE

== See also ==
- Communes of the Pas-de-Calais department
