= Buire-le-Sec =

- Commune
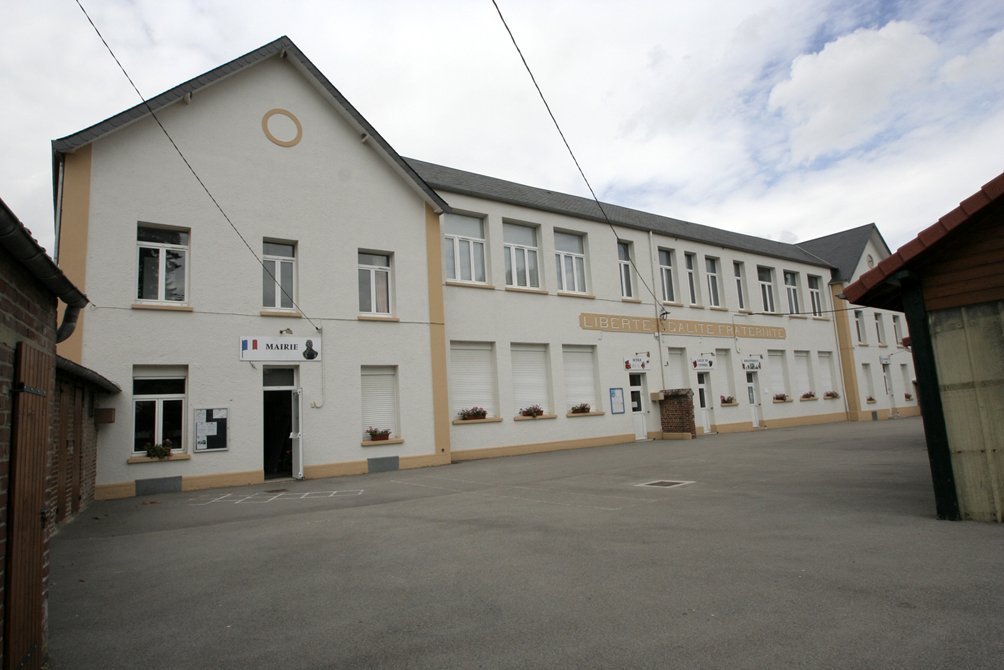
- The town hall and school of Buire-le-Sec

- Coat of arms
- Location of Buire-le-Sec
- Location within France Location within Hauts-de-France
- Coordinates: 50°23′03″N 1°49′58″E
- Country: France
- Region: Hauts-de-France
- Department: Pas-de-Calais
- Arrondissement: Montreuil
- Canton: Auxi-le-Château
- Intercommunality: CC des 7 Vallées

Government
  - Mayor (2020–2026): Isabelle Quenehen
- Area^{1}: 13.36 km^{2} (5.16 sq mi)
- Elevation: 80 m (260 ft)
- Highest elevation: 93 m (305 ft)
- Lowest elevation: 38 m (125 ft)
- Population (2023): 753
  - Density: 56.4/km^{2} (146/sq mi)
- Time zone: UTC+01:00 (CET)
  - Summer (DST): UTC+02:00 (CEST)
- INSEE/Postal code: 62183 /62870
- ^{1} French Land Register data, which excludes lakes, ponds, glaciers > 1 km^{2} (0.386 sq mi or 247 acres) and river estuaries.

Buire-le-Sec (French pronunciation: [bɥiʁ lə sɛk]; Picard: Buire-l'Sé) is a commune in the Pas-de-Calais department in the Hauts-de-France region in northern France.

== Geography ==
Buire-le-Sec is a village situated some 5 miles (8 km) southeast of Montreuil-sur-Mer on the D139 road.

== Population ==
Historical population
Year	Pop.	±% p.a.
1968	604	—
1975	543	−1.51%
1982	551	+0.21%
1990	663	+2.34%
1999	788	+1.94%
2007	793	+0.08%
2012	799	+0.15%
2017	777	−0.56%
2023	753	−0.52%
Source: INSEE

== Sights ==
The church is one of the most beautiful and oldest in the arrondissement of Montreuil. It was built in the 12th century, though all that remains of that church are the foundations. Some 13th century features remain, but mostly it is of 16th century construction (the nave and transept). It is in the form of a Latin cross and built from chalk. The dimensions are: 32 meters long, including 19m for the nave and 7m for the choir. The width of the choir and the nave is 6m, the transept 15.50m in total. The porch has ribbed vaulting.

== See also ==
- Communes of the Pas-de-Calais department
