= Saulchoy =

- Commune
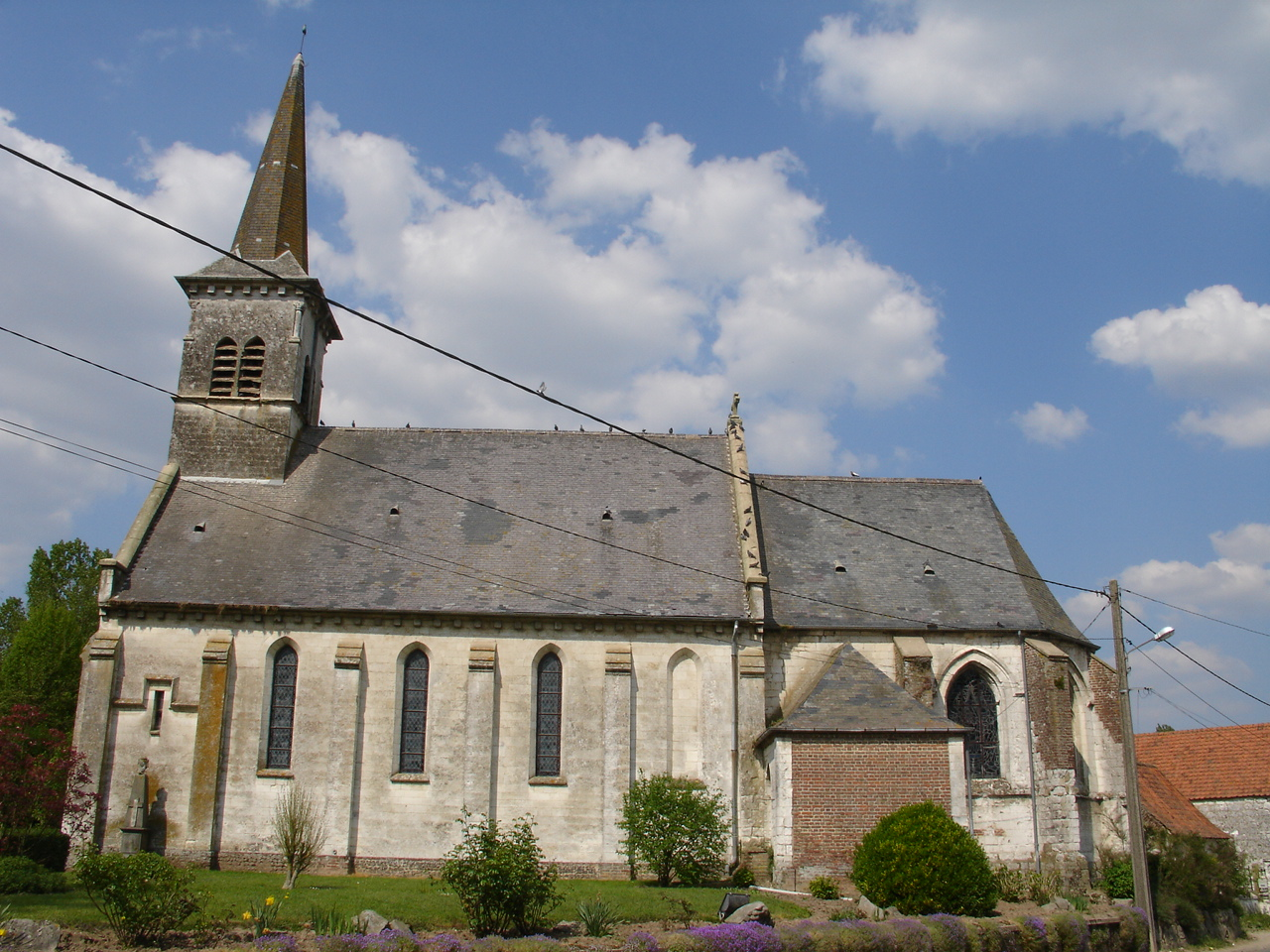
- The church of Saulchoy

- Coat of arms
- Location of Saulchoy
- Location within France Location within Hauts-de-France
- Coordinates: 50°21′00″N 1°51′02″E
- Country: France
- Region: Hauts-de-France
- Department: Pas-de-Calais
- Arrondissement: Montreuil
- Canton: Auxi-le-Château
- Intercommunality: CC des 7 Vallées

Government
  - Mayor (2020–2026): Solange Hétroy
- Area^{1}: 5.29 km^{2} (2.04 sq mi)
- Elevation: 13 m (43 ft)
- Highest elevation: 102 m (335 ft)
- Lowest elevation: 7 m (23 ft)
- Population (2023): 325
  - Density: 61.4/km^{2} (159/sq mi)
- Time zone: UTC+01:00 (CET)
  - Summer (DST): UTC+02:00 (CEST)
- INSEE/Postal code: 62783 /62870
- ^{1} French Land Register data, which excludes lakes, ponds, glaciers > 1 km^{2} (0.386 sq mi or 247 acres) and river estuaries.

Saulchoy (French pronunciation: [solʃwa]; Picard: Saulsoy) is a commune in the Pas-de-Calais department in the Hauts-de-France region of France.

== Geography ==
Saulchoy is located 8 miles (12 km) southeast of Montreuil-sur-Mer at the junction of the D137E1 and D119 roads, by the banks of the river Authie, the border with the Somme department. There's both a bar and a restaurant on the village green.

== Population ==
Historical population
| Year | Pop. | ±% p.a. |
|---|---|---|
| 1968 | 262 | — |
| 1975 | 220 | −2.47% |
| 1982 | 233 | +0.82% |
| 1990 | 260 | +1.38% |
| 1999 | 292 | +1.30% |
| 2007 | 349 | +2.25% |
| 2012 | 296 | −3.24% |
| 2017 | 317 | +1.38% |
| 2023 | 325 | +0.42% |
Source: INSEE

== Places of interest ==
- The church of St. Martin, dating from the fifteenth century

== See also ==
- Communes of the Pas-de-Calais department
