= Communauté de communes des 7 Vallées =

Federation of municipalities in France

7 Vallées
- Communauté de communes
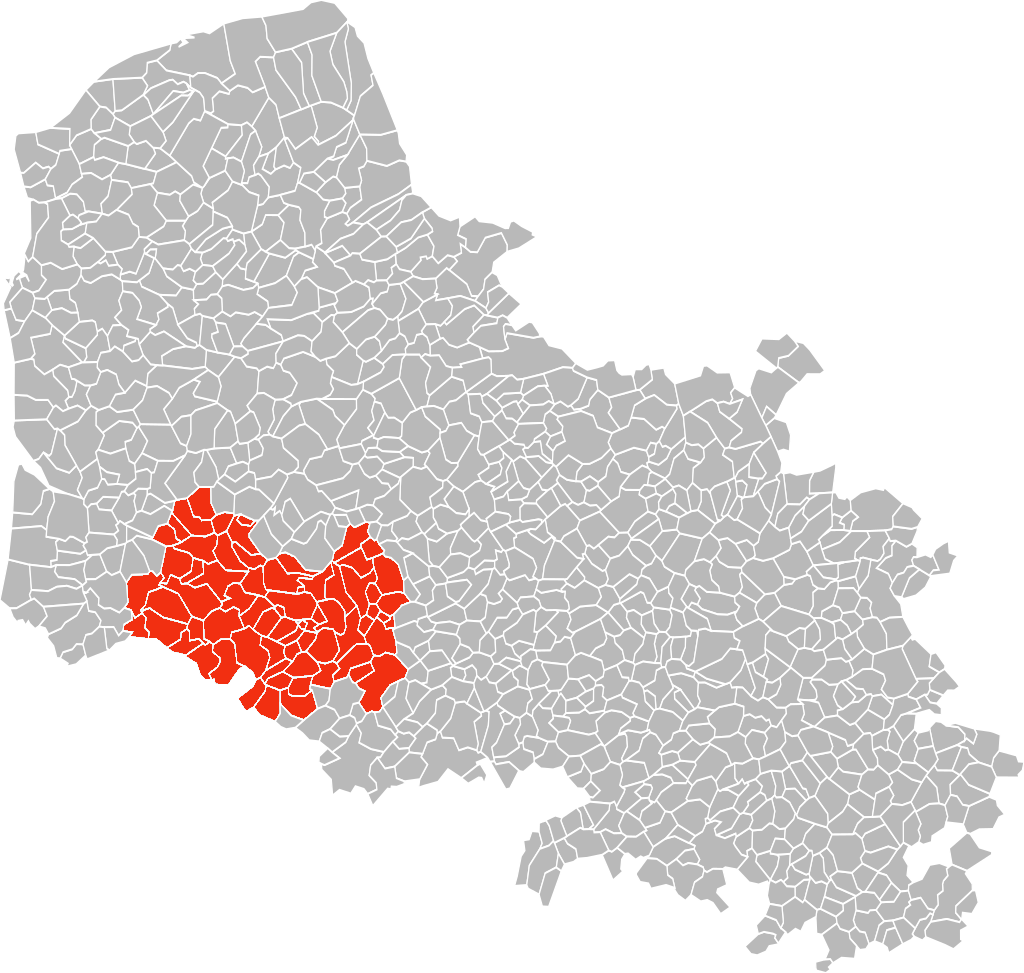
- Location of the 7 Vallées within the department
- Coordinates: 50°22′N 02°02′E
- Country: France
- Region: Hauts-de-France
- Department: Pas-de-Calais
- No. of communes: {{{nbcomm}}}
- Established: 2014
- Area: 497.3 km^{2} (192.0 sq mi)
- Population (2018): 29,653
  - Density: 59.63/km^{2} (154.4/sq mi)

The Communauté de communes des 7 Vallées (also: 7 Vallées comm) is a communauté de communes, an intercommunal structure, in the Pas-de-Calais department, in the Hauts-de-France region, northern France. It was created in January 2014 by the merger of the former communautés de communes L'Hesdinois, Canche Ternoise and Val de Canche et d'Authie. Its area is 497.3 km^{2}, and its population was 29,653 in 2018. Its seat is in Hesdin-la-Forêt.

== Composition ==
The communauté de communes consists of the following 66 communes:

1. Aix-en-Issart
2. Aubin-Saint-Vaast
3. Auchy-lès-Hesdin
4. Azincourt
5. Béalencourt
6. Beaurainville
7. Blangy-sur-Ternoise
8. Blingel
9. Boisjean
10. Boubers-lès-Hesmond
11. Bouin-Plumoison
12. Brévillers
13. Brimeux
14. Buire-le-Sec
15. Campagne-lès-Hesdin
16. Capelle-lès-Hesdin
17. Caumont
18. Cavron-Saint-Martin
19. Chériennes
20. Contes
21. Douriez
22. Éclimeux
23. Fillièvres
24. Fresnoy
25. Galametz
26. Gouy-Saint-André
27. Grigny
28. Guigny
29. Guisy
30. Hesdin-la-Forêt
31. Hesmond
32. Incourt
33. Labroye
34. Lespinoy
35. La Loge
36. Loison-sur-Créquoise
37. Maintenay
38. Maisoncelle
39. Marant
40. Marconnelle
41. Marenla
42. Maresquel-Ecquemicourt
43. Marles-sur-Canche
44. Mouriez
45. Neulette
46. Noyelles-lès-Humières
47. Offin
48. Le Parcq
49. Le Quesnoy-en-Artois
50. Raye-sur-Authie
51. Regnauville
52. Rollancourt
53. Roussent
54. Saint-Denœux
55. Saint-Georges
56. Saint-Rémy-au-Bois
57. Saulchoy
58. Sempy
59. Tortefontaine
60. Tramecourt
61. Vacqueriette-Erquières
62. Vieil-Hesdin
63. Wail
64. Wambercourt
65. Wamin
66. Willeman
