= Boisjean =

- Commune
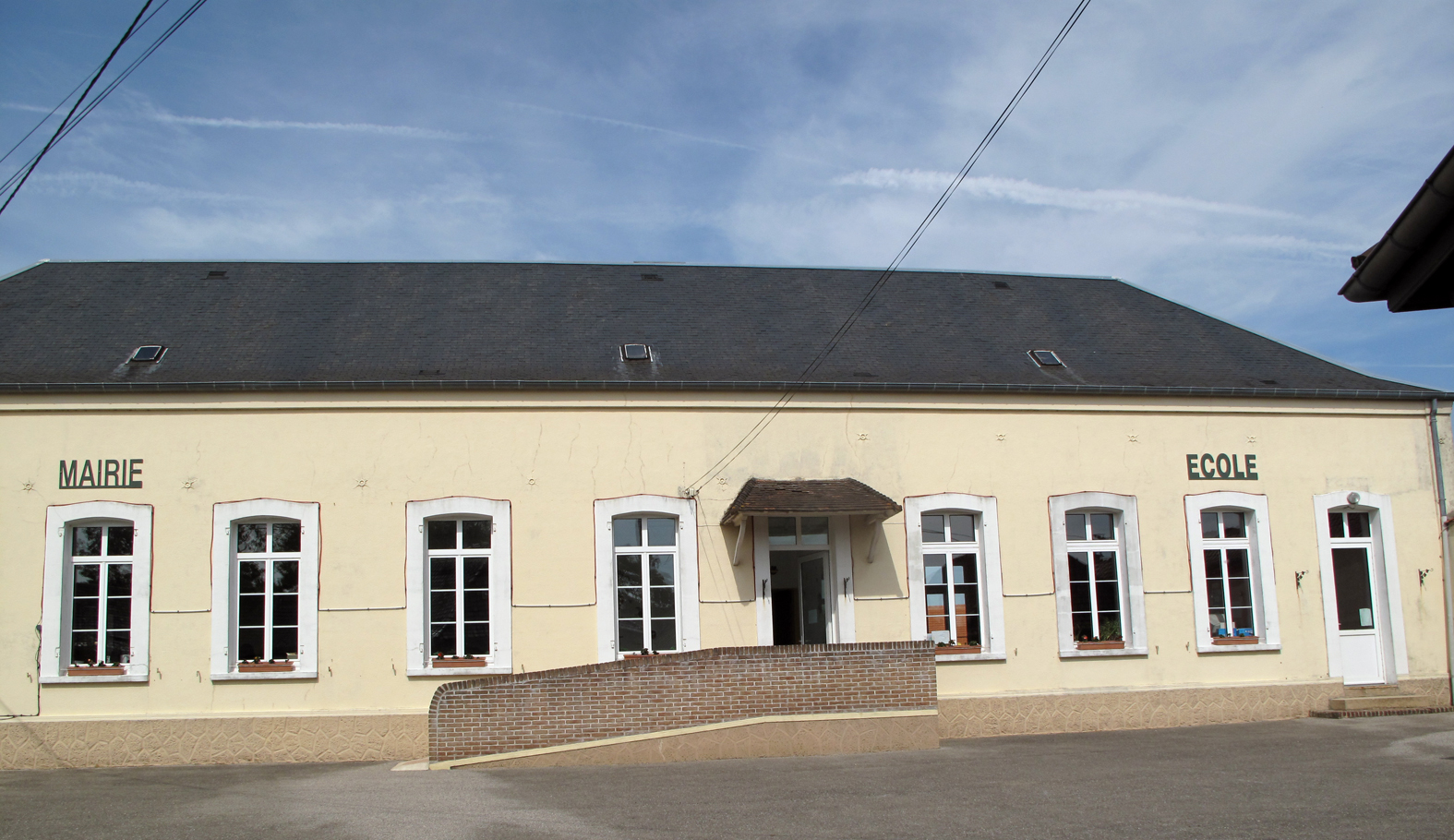
- The town hall and school of Boisjean

- Coat of arms
- Location of Boisjean
- Location within France Location within Hauts-de-France
- Coordinates: 50°24′25″N 1°46′05″E
- Country: France
- Region: Hauts-de-France
- Department: Pas-de-Calais
- Arrondissement: Montreuil
- Canton: Auxi-le-Château
- Intercommunality: CC des 7 Vallées

Government
  - Mayor (2020–2026): François Douay
- Area^{1}: 12.74 km^{2} (4.92 sq mi)
- Elevation: 69 m (226 ft)
- Highest elevation: 82 m (269 ft)
- Lowest elevation: 17 m (56 ft)
- Population (2023): 529
  - Density: 41.5/km^{2} (108/sq mi)
- Time zone: UTC+01:00 (CET)
  - Summer (DST): UTC+02:00 (CEST)
- INSEE/Postal code: 62150 /62170
- ^{1} French Land Register data, which excludes lakes, ponds, glaciers > 1 km^{2} (0.386 sq mi or 247 acres) and river estuaries.

Boisjean (French pronunciation: [bwaʒɑ̃]) is a commune in the Pas-de-Calais department in the Hauts-de-France region in northern France.

== Geography ==
A small village situated some 4 mi (6.4 km) south of Montreuil-sur-Mer at the D139 and D142 crossroads.

== Population ==
Historical population
Year	Pop.	±% p.a.
1968	382	—
1975	372	−0.38%
1982	375	+0.11%
1990	426	+1.61%
1999	437	+0.28%
2007	437	+0.00%
2012	505	+2.93%
2017	505	+0.00%
2023	529	+0.78%
Source: INSEE

== See also ==
- Communes of the Pas-de-Calais department
