= Lespinoy =

- Commune
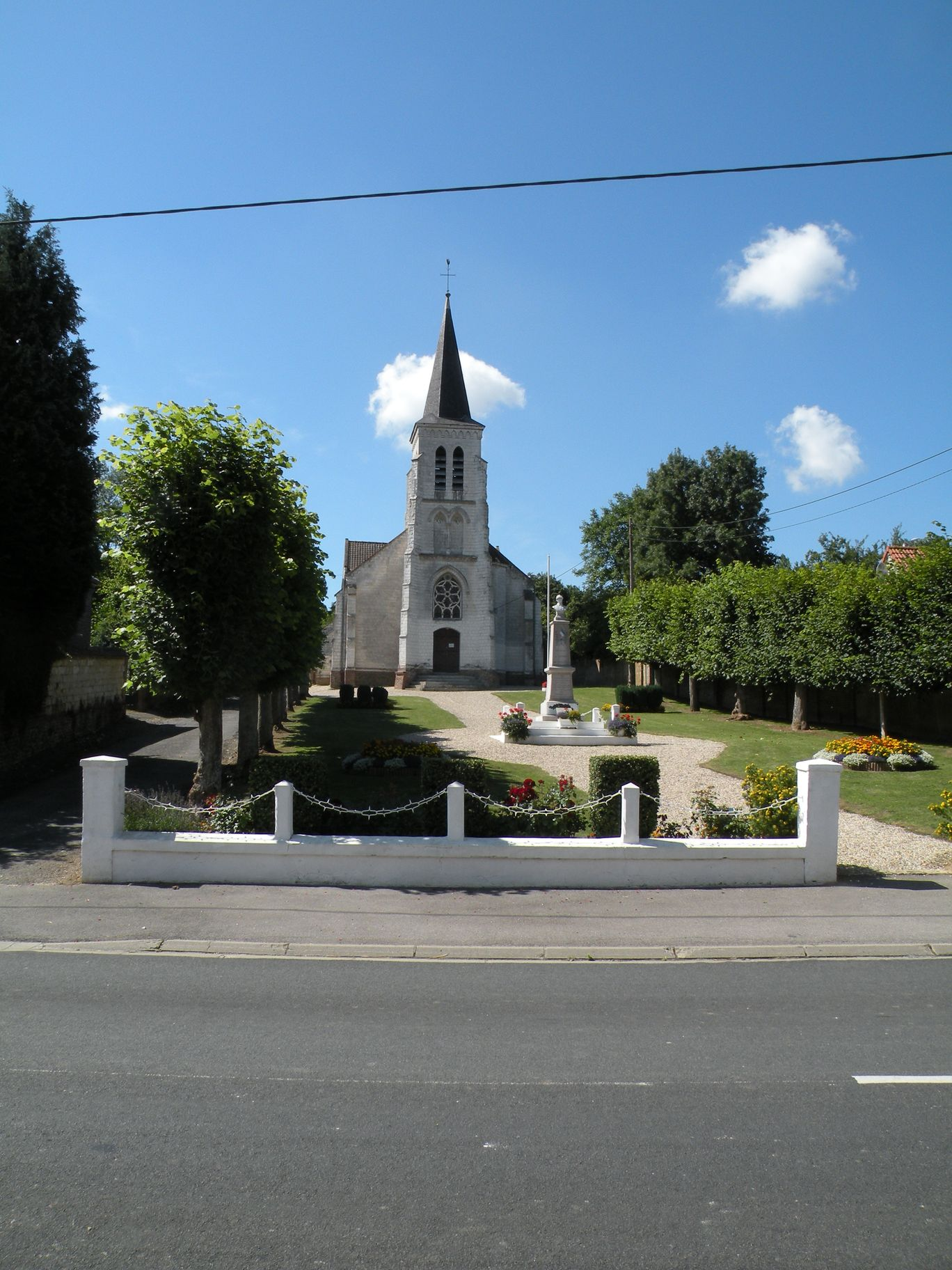
- The church of Lespinoy

- Coat of arms
- Location of Lespinoy
- Location within France Location within Hauts-de-France
- Coordinates: 50°25′46″N 1°52′37″E
- Country: France
- Region: Hauts-de-France
- Department: Pas-de-Calais
- Arrondissement: Montreuil
- Canton: Auxi-le-Château
- Intercommunality: CC des 7 Vallées

Government
  - Mayor (2020–2026): Jeany Bacquet
- Area^{1}: 3.96 km^{2} (1.53 sq mi)
- Elevation: 13 m (43 ft)
- Highest elevation: 87 m (285 ft)
- Lowest elevation: 7 m (23 ft)
- Population (2023): 243
  - Density: 61.4/km^{2} (159/sq mi)
- Time zone: UTC+01:00 (CET)
  - Summer (DST): UTC+02:00 (CEST)
- INSEE/Postal code: 62501 /62990
- ^{1} French Land Register data, which excludes lakes, ponds, glaciers > 1 km^{2} (0.386 sq mi or 247 acres) and river estuaries.

Lespinoy is a commune in the Pas-de-Calais department in the Hauts-de-France region of France 4 miles (6 km) southeast of Montreuil-sur-Mer in the Canche valley.

== Population ==
Historical population
Year	Pop.	±% p.a.
1968	159	—
1975	164	+0.44%
1982	195	+2.50%
1990	242	+2.74%
1999	233	−0.42%
2007	206	−1.53%
2012	226	+1.87%
2017	222	−0.36%
2023	243	+1.52%
Source: INSEE

== See also ==
- Communes of the Pas-de-Calais department
