= Saint-Denœux =

- Commune
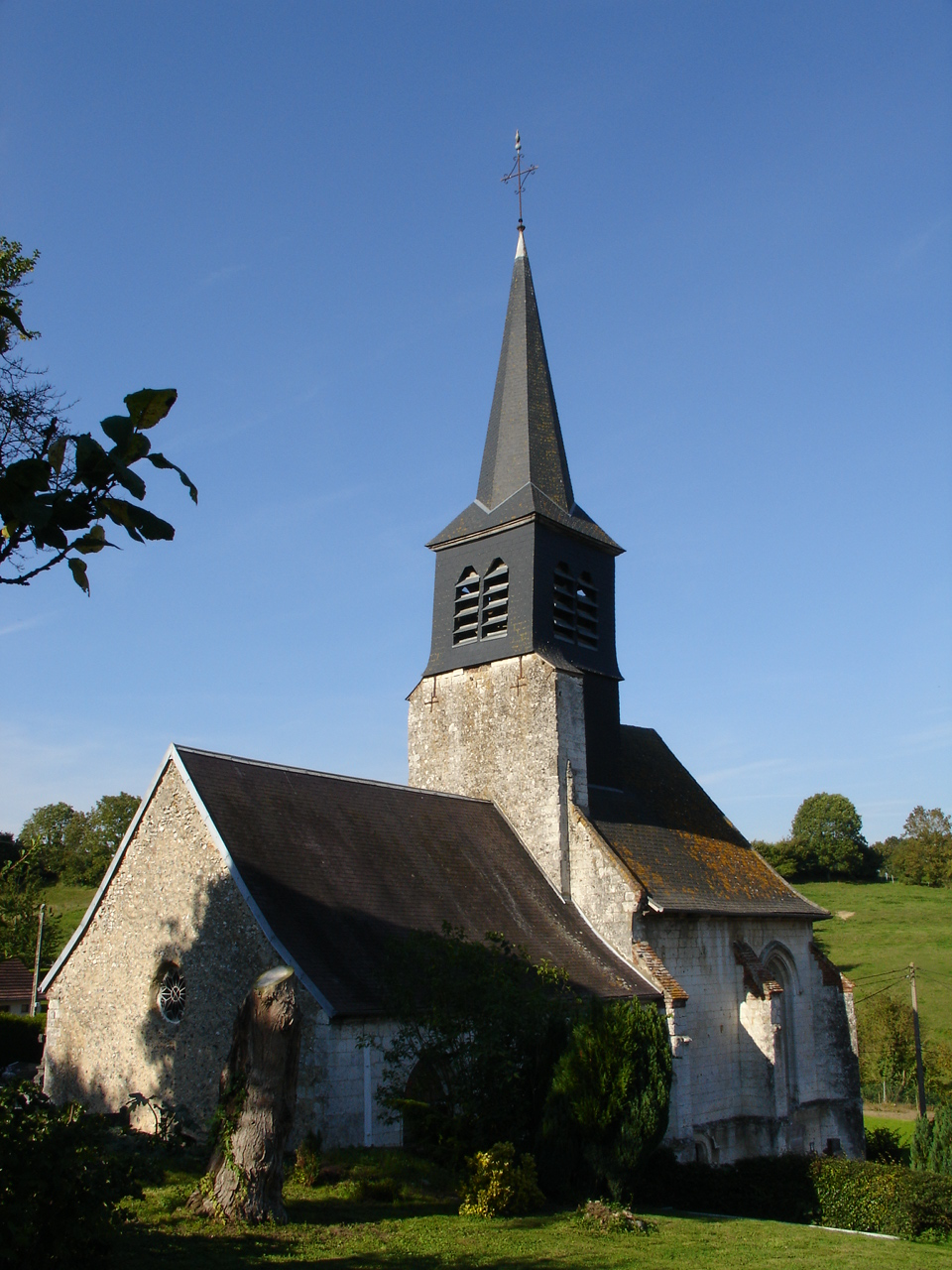
- The church of Saint-Denoeux

- Coat of arms
- Location of Saint-Denœux
- Location within France Location within Hauts-de-France
- Coordinates: 50°28′23″N 1°54′23″E
- Country: France
- Region: Hauts-de-France
- Department: Pas-de-Calais
- Arrondissement: Montreuil
- Canton: Auxi-le-Château
- Intercommunality: CC des 7 Vallées

Government
  - Mayor (2025–2026): Irénée Therry
- Area^{1}: 4.03 km^{2} (1.56 sq mi)
- Elevation: 44 m (144 ft)
- Highest elevation: 123 m (404 ft)
- Lowest elevation: 37 m (121 ft)
- Population (2023): 173
  - Density: 42.9/km^{2} (111/sq mi)
- Time zone: UTC+01:00 (CET)
  - Summer (DST): UTC+02:00 (CEST)
- INSEE/Postal code: 62745 /62990
- ^{1} French Land Register data, which excludes lakes, ponds, glaciers > 1 km^{2} (0.386 sq mi or 247 acres) and river estuaries.

Saint-Denœux is a commune in the Pas-de-Calais department in the Hauts-de-France region of France.

== Geography ==
Saint-Denœux is located 6 miles (9 km) east of Montreuil-sur-Mer at the junction of the D149 and D153 roads.

== Population ==
Historical population
Year	Pop.	±% p.a.
1968	192	—
1975	186	−0.45%
1982	157	−2.39%
1990	149	−0.65%
1999	116	−2.74%
2007	123	+0.74%
2012	147	+3.63%
2017	160	+1.71%
2023	173	+1.31%
Source: INSEE

== Places of interest ==
- The church of St. Austreberthe, dating from the sixteenth century
- A watermill

== See also ==
- Communes of the Pas-de-Calais department
