= Douriez =

- Commune
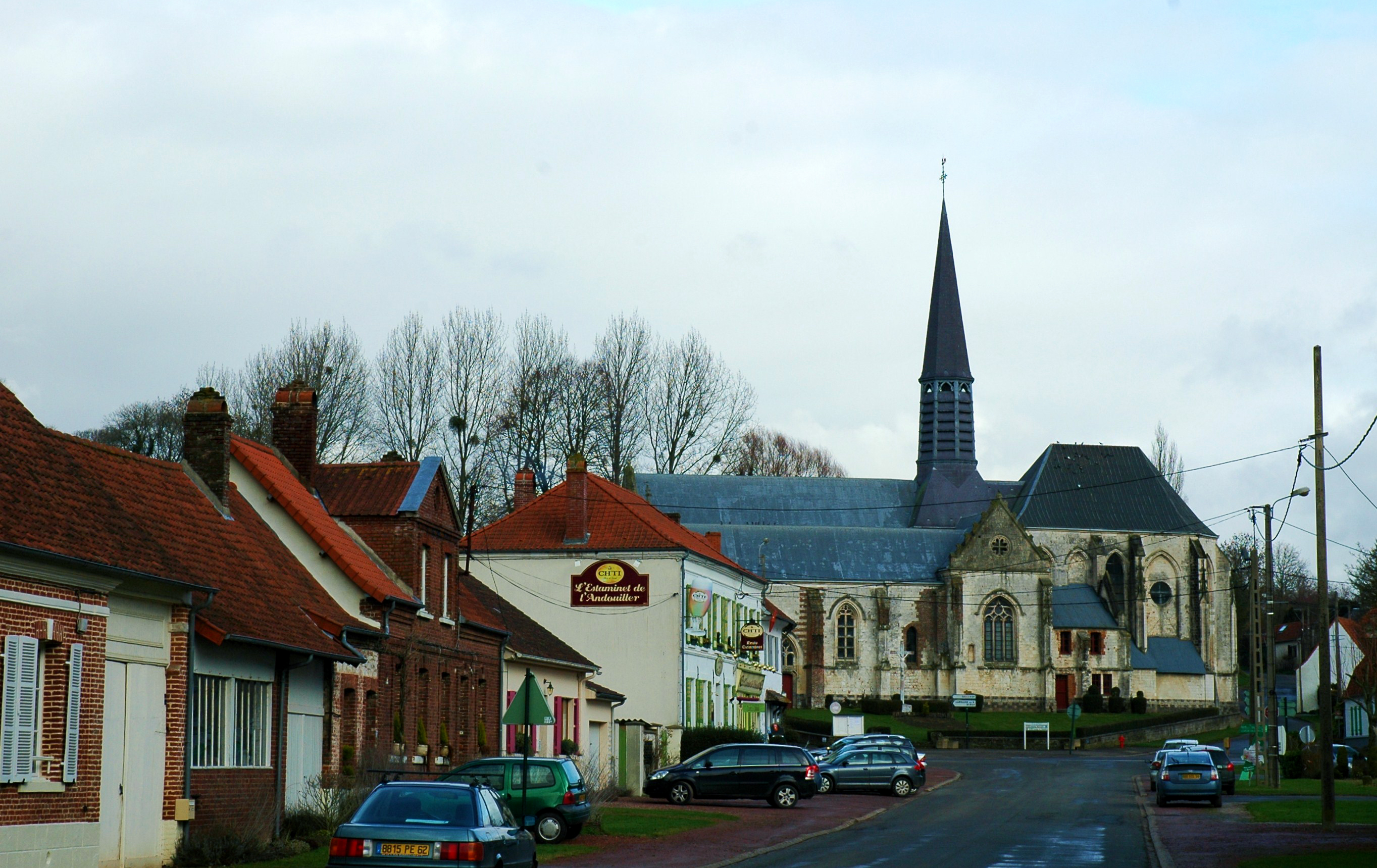
- The centre of Douriez

- Coat of arms
- Location of Douriez
- Location within France Location within Hauts-de-France
- Coordinates: 50°19′59″N 1°52′43″E
- Country: France
- Region: Hauts-de-France
- Department: Pas-de-Calais
- Arrondissement: Montreuil
- Canton: Auxi-le-Château
- Intercommunality: CC des 7 Vallées

Government
  - Mayor (2020–2026): Karl Paillart
- Area^{1}: 8.84 km^{2} (3.41 sq mi)
- Elevation: 14 m (46 ft)
- Highest elevation: 102 m (335 ft)
- Lowest elevation: 7 m (23 ft)
- Population (2023): 296
  - Density: 33.5/km^{2} (86.7/sq mi)
- Time zone: UTC+01:00 (CET)
  - Summer (DST): UTC+02:00 (CEST)
- INSEE/Postal code: 62275 /62870
- ^{1} French Land Register data, which excludes lakes, ponds, glaciers > 1 km^{2} (0.386 sq mi or 247 acres) and river estuaries.

Douriez (French pronunciation: [duʁje]) is a commune in the Pas-de-Calais department in the Hauts-de-France region of France.

== Geography ==
A rural village situated some 30 miles (48 km) southeast of Montreuil-sur-Mer on the D119 road, by the banks of the river Authie, the border with the Somme department.

== Places of interest ==
- The sixteenth-century church of the Nativité-de-Notre-Dame
- Remains of a 13th-century château
- A water mill
- Douriez Church
- Chateau Valloires
- Douries Chateau (Manoir)
- l'Estaminet Restaurant
- Douriez part and one of the seven valleys of nature
- Douriez the home of Baron & Baroness Guibal
- l'Auberge du gros tilleul (the best ***** )

== Population ==
Historical population
Year	Pop.	±% p.a.
1968	281	—
1975	239	−2.29%
1982	259	+1.15%
1990	256	−0.15%
1999	296	+1.63%
2007	289	−0.30%
2012	317	+1.87%
2017	326	+0.56%
2023	296	−1.60%
Source: INSEE

== See also ==
- Communes of the Pas-de-Calais department
