= Galametz =

- Commune
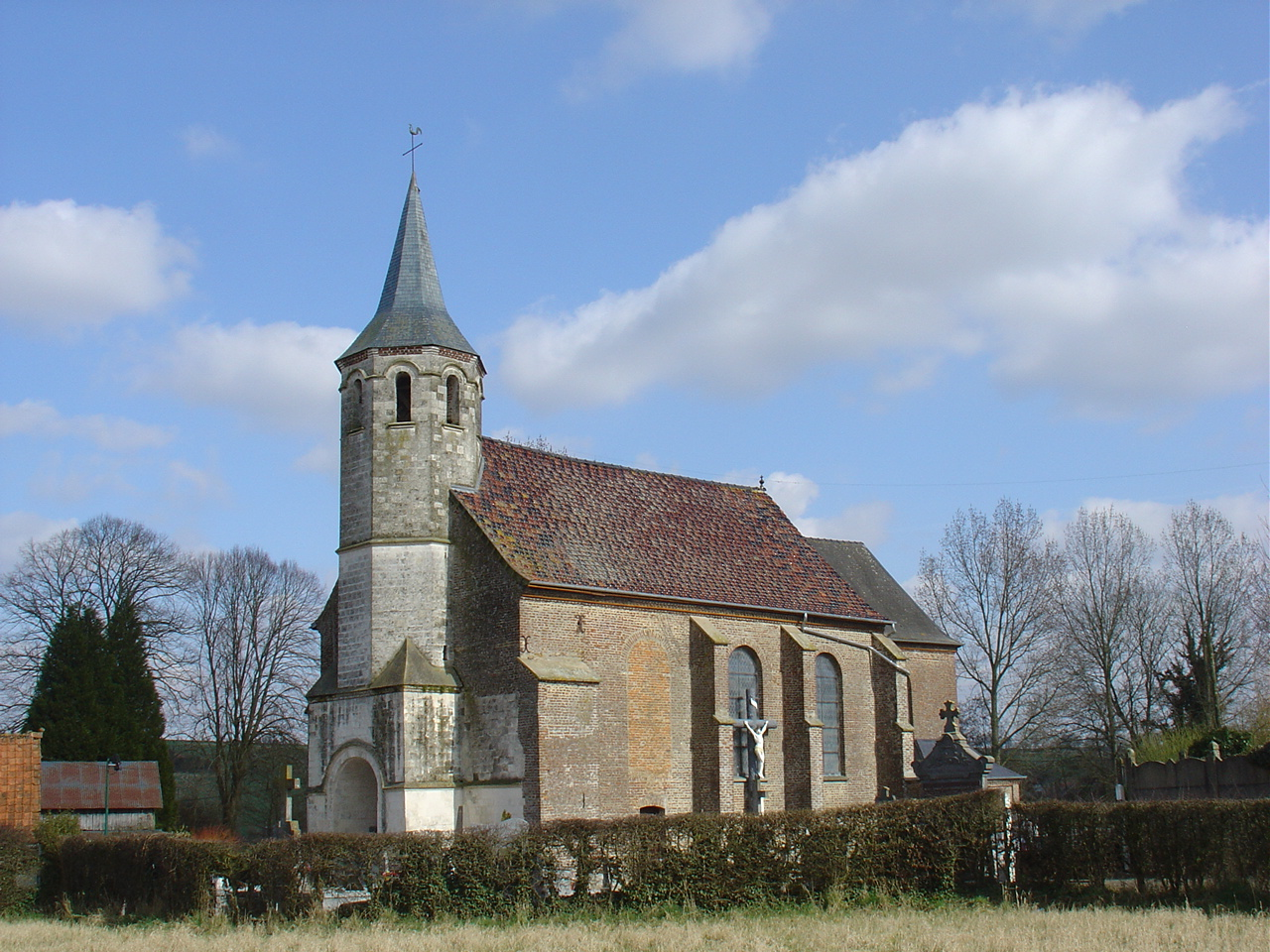
- The church of Galametz

- Coat of arms
- Location of Galametz
- Location within France Location within Hauts-de-France
- Coordinates: 50°19′45″N 2°08′22″E
- Country: France
- Region: Hauts-de-France
- Department: Pas-de-Calais
- Arrondissement: Montreuil
- Canton: Auxi-le-Château
- Intercommunality: CC des 7 Vallées

Government
  - Mayor (2020–2026): Rene Bienaimé
- Area^{1}: 4.27 km^{2} (1.65 sq mi)
- Elevation: 43 m (141 ft)
- Highest elevation: 131 m (430 ft)
- Lowest elevation: 37 m (121 ft)
- Population (2023): 208
  - Density: 48.7/km^{2} (126/sq mi)
- Time zone: UTC+01:00 (CET)
  - Summer (DST): UTC+02:00 (CEST)
- INSEE/Postal code: 62365 /62770
- ^{1} French Land Register data, which excludes lakes, ponds, glaciers > 1 km^{2} (0.386 sq mi or 247 acres) and river estuaries.

Galametz is a commune in the Pas-de-Calais department in the Hauts-de-France region of France.

== Geography ==
A small village situated some 20 miles (32 km) southeast of Montreuil-sur-Mer on the D340 road.

== Population ==
Historical population
Year	Pop.	±% p.a.
1968	131	—
1975	124	−0.78%
1982	160	+3.71%
1990	148	−0.97%
1999	157	+0.66%
2007	172	+1.15%
2012	193	+2.33%
2017	199	+0.61%
2023	208	+0.74%
Source: INSEE

== Places of interest ==
- Church of St. Martin, dating from the eighteenth century.

== See also ==
- Communes of the Pas-de-Calais department
