= Vacqueriette-Erquières =

- Commune
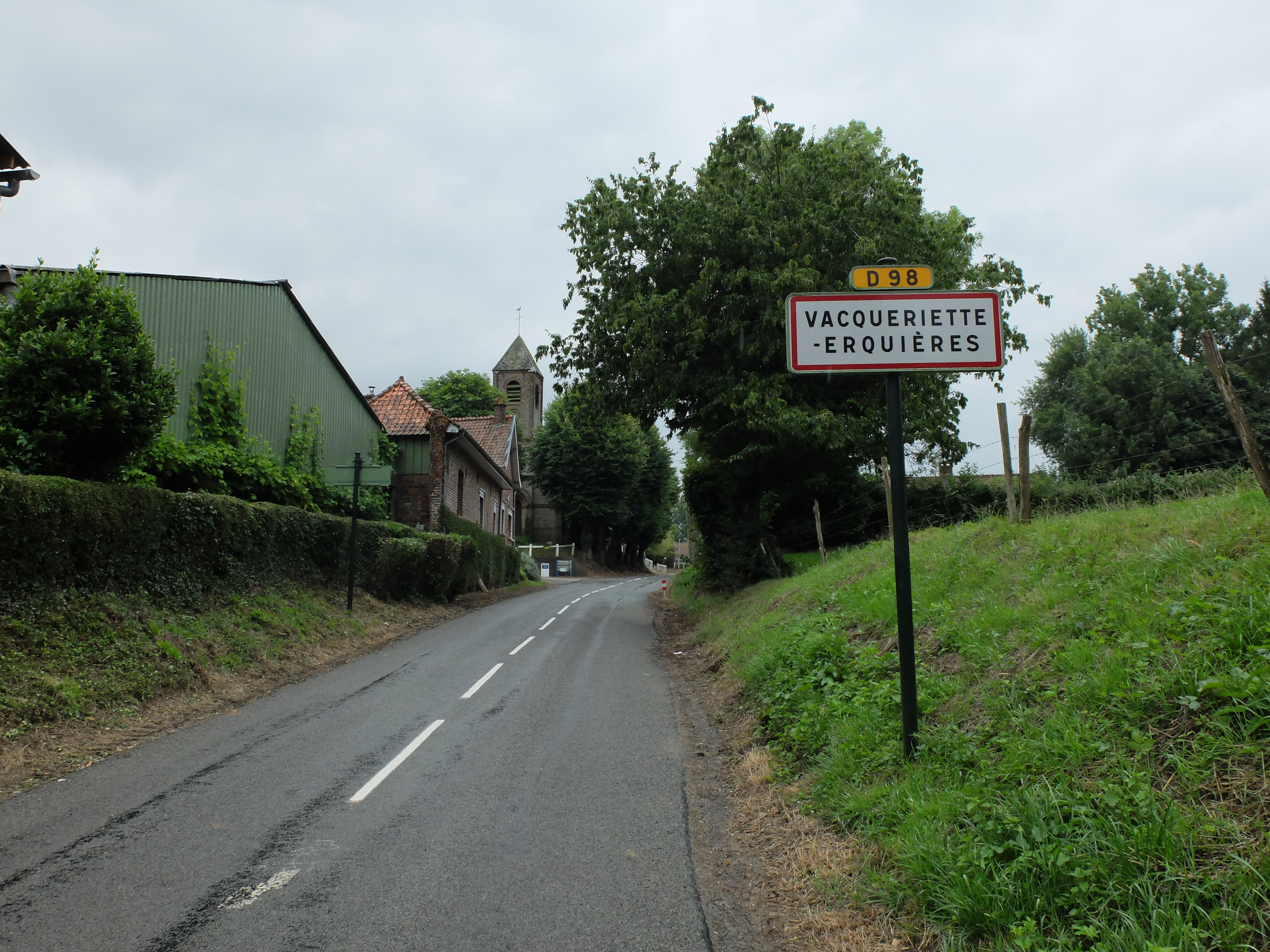
- The road into Vacqueriette-Erquières

- Coat of arms
- Location of Vacqueriette-Erquières
- Location within France Location within Hauts-de-France
- Coordinates: 50°19′30″N 2°04′42″E
- Country: France
- Region: Hauts-de-France
- Department: Pas-de-Calais
- Arrondissement: Montreuil
- Canton: Auxi-le-Château
- Intercommunality: CC des 7 Vallées

Government
  - Mayor (2020–2026): Jean-Paul Lagache
- Area^{1}: 5.94 km^{2} (2.29 sq mi)
- Elevation: 129 m (423 ft)
- Highest elevation: 142 m (466 ft)
- Lowest elevation: 70 m (230 ft)
- Population (2023): 245
  - Density: 41.2/km^{2} (107/sq mi)
- Time zone: UTC+01:00 (CET)
  - Summer (DST): UTC+02:00 (CEST)
- INSEE/Postal code: 62834 /62140
- ^{1} French Land Register data, which excludes lakes, ponds, glaciers > 1 km^{2} (0.386 sq mi or 247 acres) and river estuaries.

Vacqueriette-Erquières is a commune in the Pas-de-Calais department in the Hauts-de-France region of France.

== Geography ==
Vacqueriette-Erquières is located 18 miles (27 km) southeast of Montreuil-sur-Mer on the D122 road, 4 miles (6 km) south of Hesdin.

== Population ==
Historical population
Year	Pop.	±% p.a.
1968	364	—
1975	319	−1.87%
1982	291	−1.30%
1990	248	−1.98%
1999	247	−0.04%
2007	244	−0.15%
2012	248	+0.33%
2017	253	+0.40%
2023	245	−0.53%
Source: INSEE

== Places of interest ==
- The church of Notre-Dame and, at Erquières, St. Firmin's church, both dating from the nineteenth century.

== See also ==
- Communes of the Pas-de-Calais department
