= Blingel =

- Commune
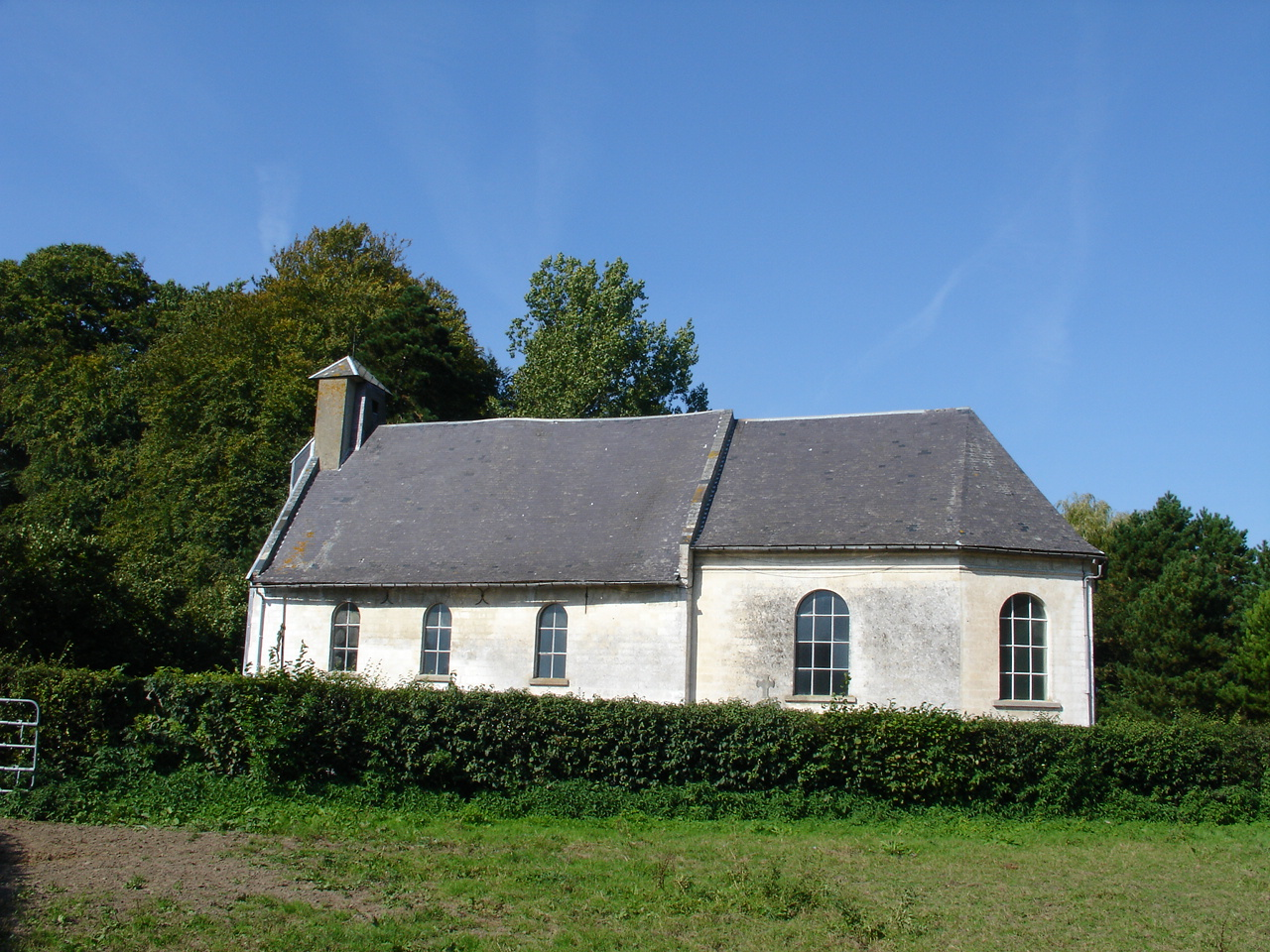
- The church of Blingel

- Coat of arms
- Location of Blingel
- Location within France Location within Hauts-de-France
- Coordinates: 50°24′34″N 2°08′55″E
- Country: France
- Region: Hauts-de-France
- Department: Pas-de-Calais
- Arrondissement: Montreuil
- Canton: Auxi-le-Château
- Intercommunality: CC des 7 Vallées

Government
  - Mayor (2020–2026): Karine Delannoy
- Area^{1}: 3.17 km^{2} (1.22 sq mi)
- Elevation: 40 m (130 ft)
- Highest elevation: 106 m (348 ft)
- Lowest elevation: 36 m (118 ft)
- Population (2023): 160
  - Density: 50/km^{2} (130/sq mi)
- Time zone: UTC+01:00 (CET)
  - Summer (DST): UTC+02:00 (CEST)
- INSEE/Postal code: 62142 /62770
- ^{1} French Land Register data, which excludes lakes, ponds, glaciers > 1 km^{2} (0.386 sq mi or 247 acres) and river estuaries.

Blingel (French pronunciation: [blɛ̃ʒɛl]) is a commune in the Pas-de-Calais department in the Hauts-de-France region in northern France.

== Geography ==
A small village situated some 5 miles(8 km) northeast of Hesdin at the D94 and D107 crossroads.

== Population ==
Historical population
Year	Pop.	±% p.a.
1968	171	—
1975	137	−3.12%
1982	137	+0.00%
1990	122	−1.44%
1999	117	−0.46%
2007	98	−2.19%
2012	123	+4.65%
2017	166	+6.18%
2023	160	−0.61%
Source: INSEE

== See also ==
- Communes of the Pas-de-Calais department
