= Maintenay =

- Commune
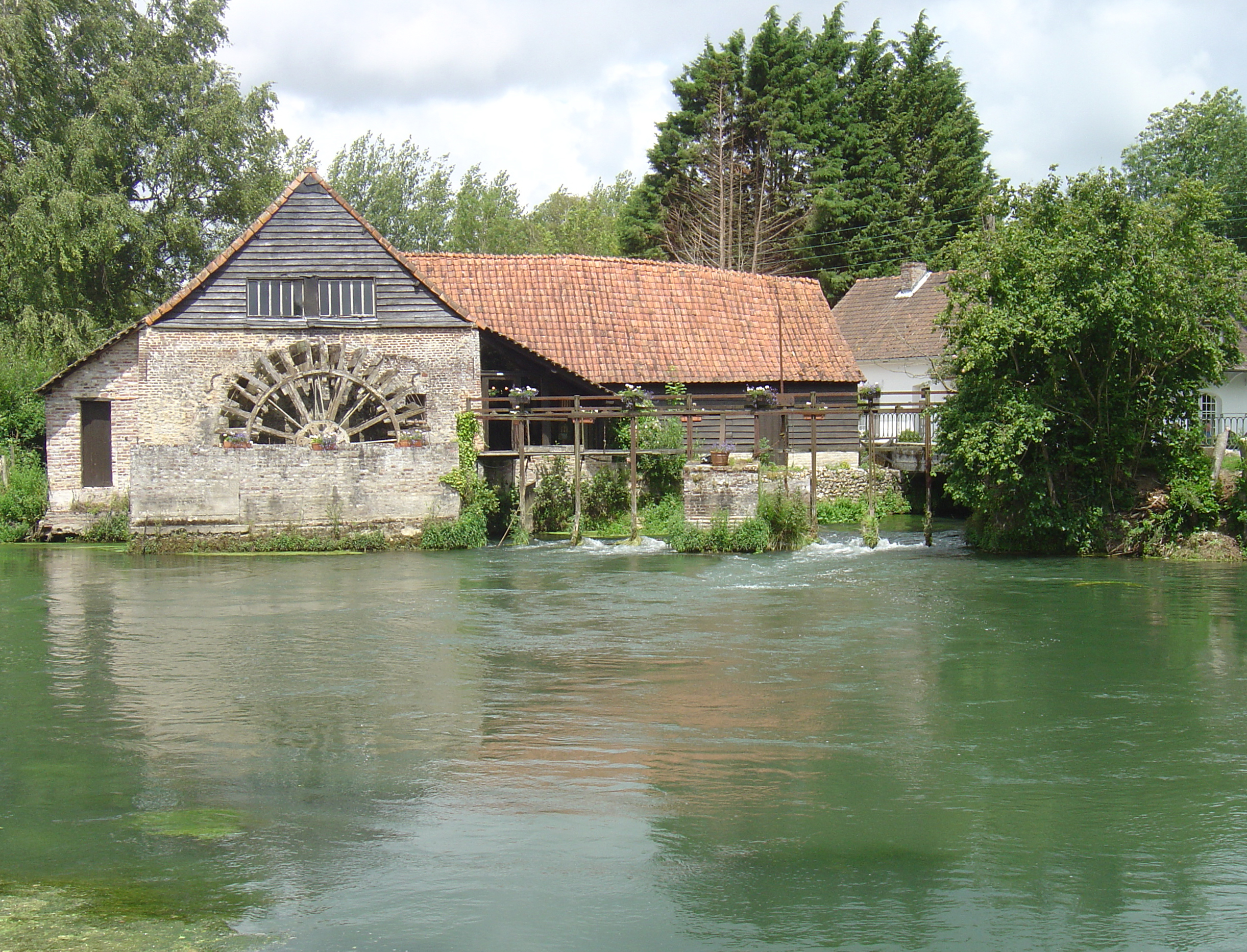
- Restored watermill

- Coat of arms
- Location of Maintenay
- Location within France Location within Hauts-de-France
- Coordinates: 50°22′03″N 1°48′47″E
- Country: France
- Region: Hauts-de-France
- Department: Pas-de-Calais
- Arrondissement: Montreuil
- Canton: Auxi-le-Château
- Intercommunality: CC des 7 Vallées

Government
  - Mayor (2020–2026): Reynald Denoeux
- Area^{1}: 12.11 km^{2} (4.68 sq mi)
- Elevation: 68 m (223 ft)
- Highest elevation: 102 m (335 ft)
- Lowest elevation: 5 m (16 ft)
- Population (2023): 451
  - Density: 37.2/km^{2} (96.5/sq mi)
- Time zone: UTC+01:00 (CET)
  - Summer (DST): UTC+02:00 (CEST)
- INSEE/Postal code: 62538 /62870
- ^{1} French Land Register data, which excludes lakes, ponds, glaciers > 1 km^{2} (0.386 sq mi or 247 acres) and river estuaries.

Maintenay (French pronunciation: [mɛ̃tnɛ]) is a commune in the Pas-de-Calais department in the Hauts-de-France region of France. 9 miles (14 km) south of Montreuil-sur-Mer.

== Population ==
Historical population
Year	Pop.	±% p.a.
1968	375	—
1975	401	+0.96%
1982	405	+0.14%
1990	381	−0.76%
1999	322	−1.85%
2007	377	+1.99%
2012	391	+0.73%
2017	426	+1.73%
2023	451	+0.95%
Source: INSEE

== See also ==
- Communes of the Pas-de-Calais department
