= Wail, Pas-de-Calais =

Wail
- Commune
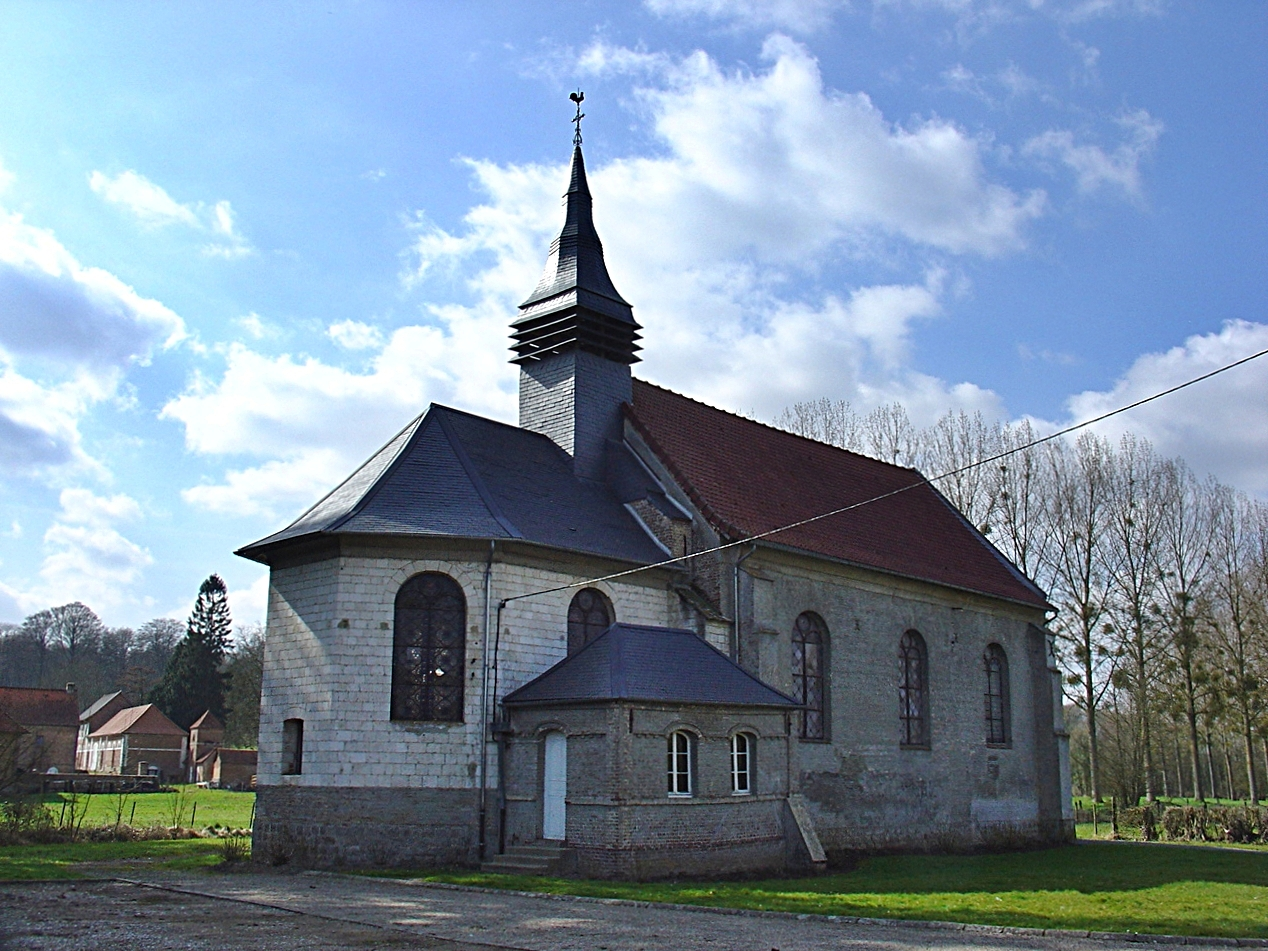
- The church of Wail
- Location of Wail
- Location within France Location within Hauts-de-France
- Coordinates: 50°20′53″N 2°07′42″E
- Country: France
- Region: Hauts-de-France
- Department: Pas-de-Calais
- Arrondissement: Montreuil
- Canton: Auxi-le-Château
- Intercommunality: CC des 7 Vallées

Government
  - Mayor (2020–2026): Serge Gotterand
- Area^{1}: 9.15 km^{2} (3.53 sq mi)
- Elevation: 72 m (236 ft)
- Highest elevation: 137 m (449 ft)
- Lowest elevation: 34 m (112 ft)
- Population (2023): 261
  - Density: 28.5/km^{2} (73.9/sq mi)
- Time zone: UTC+01:00 (CET)
  - Summer (DST): UTC+02:00 (CEST)
- INSEE/Postal code: 62868 /62770
- ^{1} French Land Register data, which excludes lakes, ponds, glaciers > 1 km^{2} (0.386 sq mi or 247 acres) and river estuaries.

Wail is a commune in the Pas-de-Calais department in the Hauts-de-France region of France.

== Geography ==
Wail is located 21 miles (33 km) southeast of Montreuil-sur-Mer, at the D98 and D340 road junction, 4miles (6k) east of Hesdin.

== Population ==
Historical population
Year	Pop.	±% p.a.
1968	304	—
1975	315	+0.51%
1982	278	−1.77%
1990	224	−2.66%
1999	265	+1.89%
2007	258	−0.33%
2012	279	+1.58%
2017	262	−1.25%
2023	261	−0.06%
Source: INSEE

== Places of interest ==
- The church of St. Martin, dating from the eighteenth century.

== See also ==
- Communes of the Pas-de-Calais department
