= Saint-Rémy-au-Bois =

- Commune
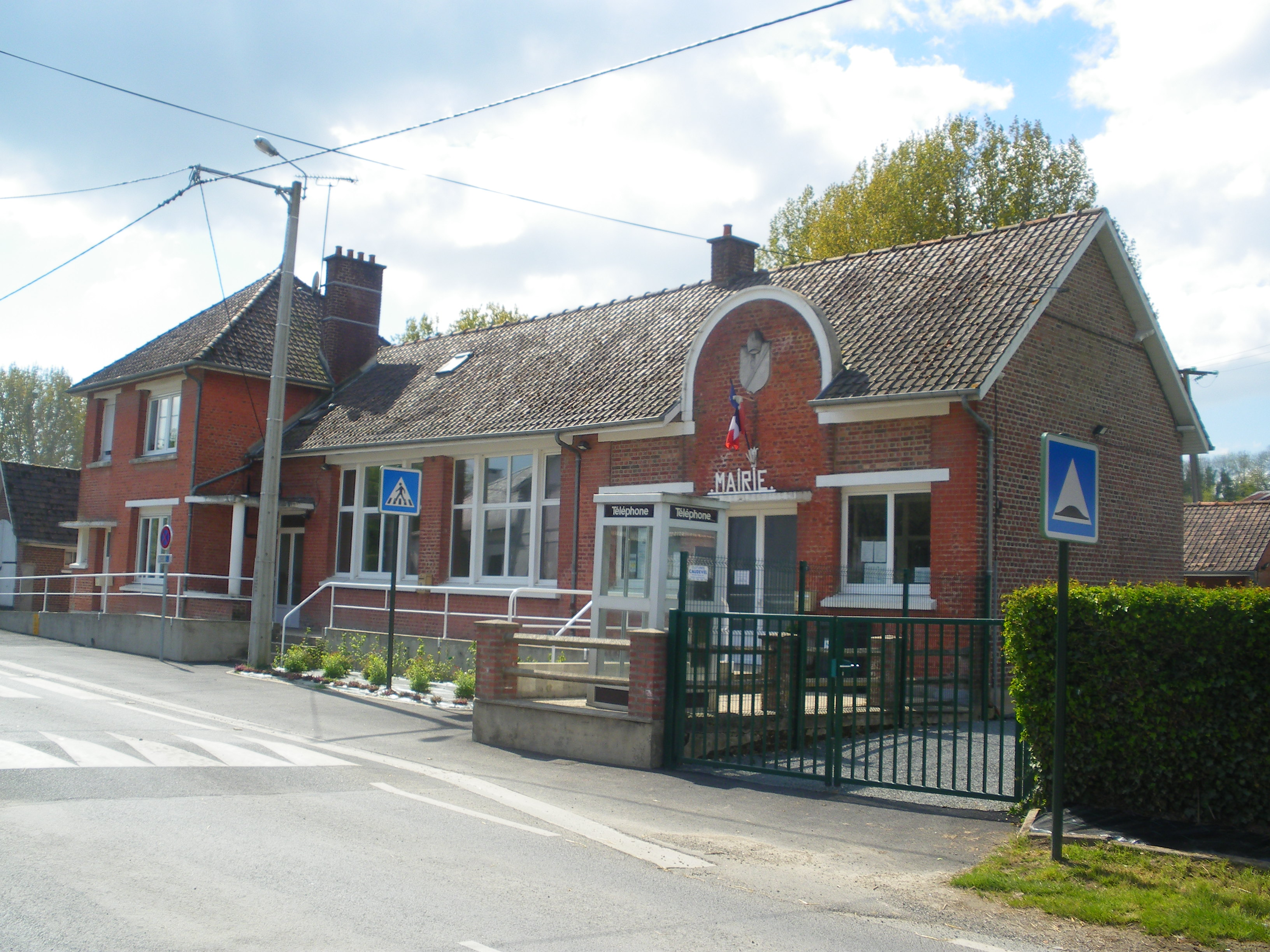
- The town hall of Saint-Rémy-au-Bois

- Coat of arms
- Location of Saint-Rémy-au-Bois
- Location within France Location within Hauts-de-France
- Coordinates: 50°22′04″N 1°52′30″E
- Country: France
- Region: Hauts-de-France
- Department: Pas-de-Calais
- Arrondissement: Montreuil
- Canton: Auxi-le-Château
- Intercommunality: CC des 7 Vallées

Government
  - Mayor (2020–2026): Patrick Desreumaux
- Area^{1}: 4.05 km^{2} (1.56 sq mi)
- Elevation: 31 m (102 ft)
- Highest elevation: 102 m (335 ft)
- Lowest elevation: 15 m (49 ft)
- Population (2023): 105
  - Density: 25.9/km^{2} (67.1/sq mi)
- Time zone: UTC+01:00 (CET)
  - Summer (DST): UTC+02:00 (CEST)
- INSEE/Postal code: 62768 /62870
- ^{1} French Land Register data, which excludes lakes, ponds, glaciers > 1 km^{2} (0.386 sq mi or 247 acres) and river estuaries.

Saint-Rémy-au-Bois (French pronunciation: [sɛ̃ ʁemi o bwa]; Picard: Saint-Rémy-au-Bo) is a commune in the Pas-de-Calais department in the Hauts-de-France region of France.

== Geography ==
Saint-Rémy-au-Bois is located 10 miles (16 km) southeast of Montreuil-sur-Mer on the D129 road.

== Population ==
Historical population
Year	Pop.	±% p.a.
1968	163	—
1975	122	−4.05%
1982	118	−0.48%
1990	100	−2.05%
1999	111	+1.17%
2007	121	+1.08%
2012	107	−2.43%
2017	101	−1.15%
2023	105	+0.65%
Source: INSEE

== Places of interest ==
- The church of St. Rémy, dating from the eighteenth century
- A sixteenth-century bridge

== See also ==
- Communes of the Pas-de-Calais department
