= Brévillers, Pas-de-Calais =

Brévillers
- Commune
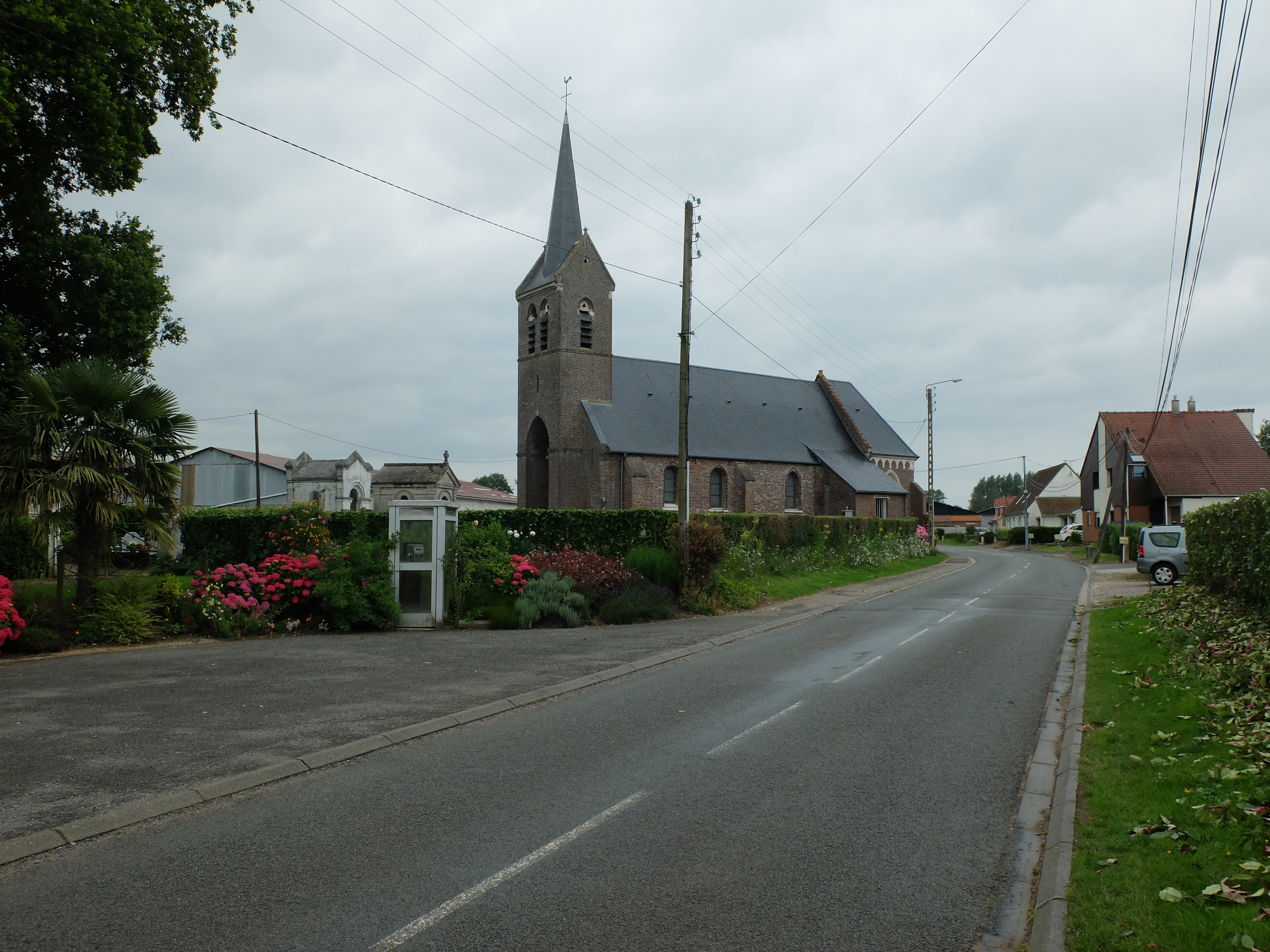
- The church of Brévillers

- Coat of arms
- Location of Brévillers
- Location within France Location within Hauts-de-France
- Coordinates: 50°20′50″N 2°01′39″E
- Country: France
- Region: Hauts-de-France
- Department: Pas-de-Calais
- Arrondissement: Montreuil
- Canton: Auxi-le-Château
- Intercommunality: CC des 7 Vallées

Government
  - Mayor (2020–2026): Christiane Girard
- Area^{1}: 3.03 km^{2} (1.17 sq mi)
- Elevation: 122 m (400 ft)
- Highest elevation: 130 m (430 ft)
- Lowest elevation: 60 m (200 ft)
- Population (2023): 156
  - Density: 51.5/km^{2} (133/sq mi)
- Time zone: UTC+01:00 (CET)
  - Summer (DST): UTC+02:00 (CEST)
- INSEE/Postal code: 62175 /62140
- ^{1} French Land Register data, which excludes lakes, ponds, glaciers > 1 km^{2} (0.386 sq mi or 247 acres) and river estuaries.

Brévillers is a commune in the Pas-de-Calais department in the Hauts-de-France region in northern France.

== Geography ==
Brévillers is a village situated some 15 miles (24 km) southeast of Montreuil-sur-Mer on the D135 road.

== Population ==
Historical population
Year	Pop.	±% p.a.
1968	111	—
1975	131	+2.39%
1982	120	−1.25%
1990	119	−0.10%
1999	107	−1.17%
2007	125	+1.96%
2012	153	+4.13%
2017	158	+0.65%
2023	156	−0.21%
Source: INSEE

== See also ==
- Communes of the Pas-de-Calais department
