= Marenla =

- Commune
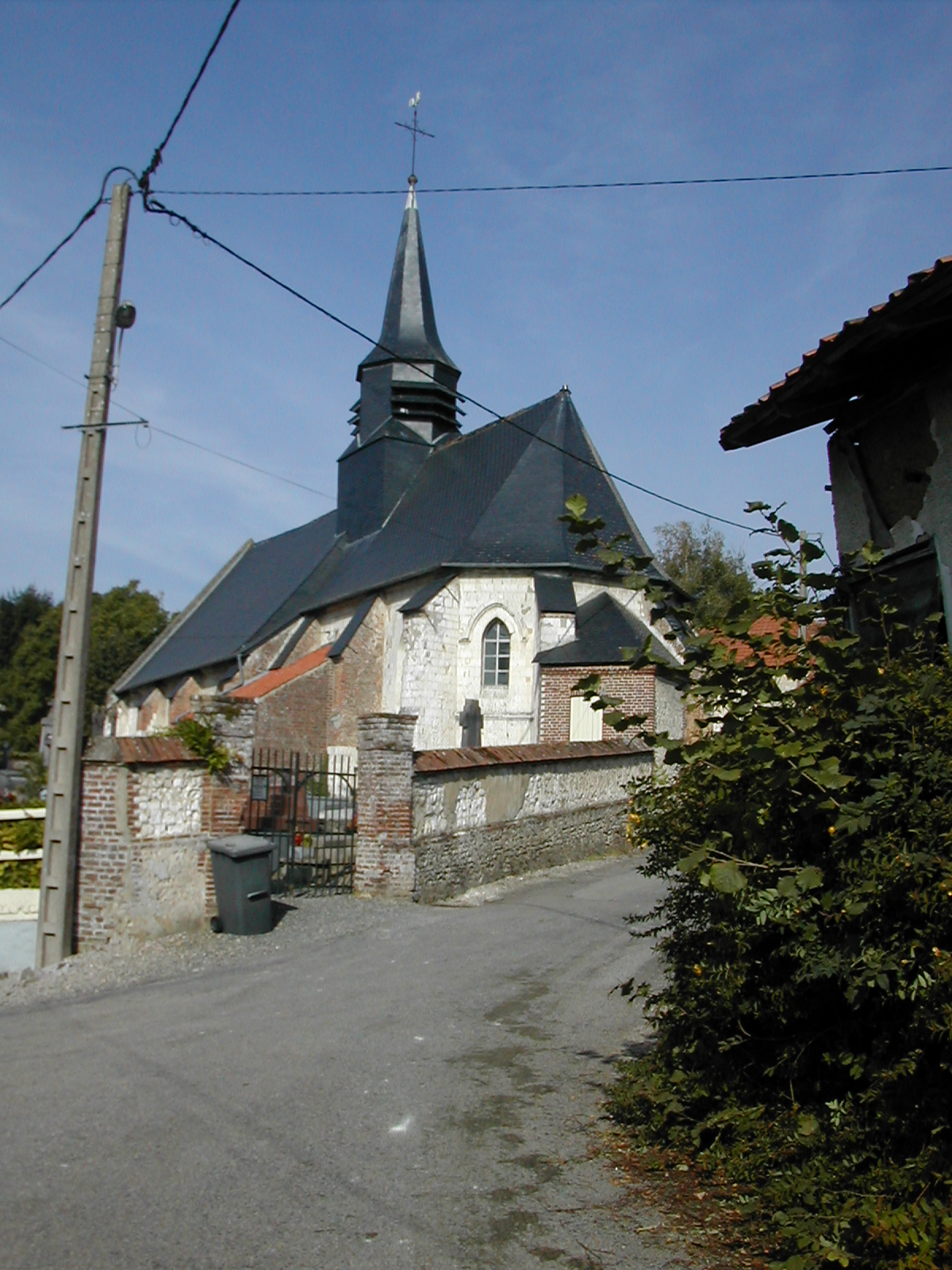
- The church of Marenla

- Coat of arms
- Location of Marenla
- Location within France Location within Hauts-de-France
- Coordinates: 50°26′43″N 1°50′06″E
- Country: France
- Region: Hauts-de-France
- Department: Pas-de-Calais
- Arrondissement: Montreuil
- Canton: Auxi-le-Château
- Intercommunality: CC des 7 Vallées

Government
  - Mayor (2020–2026): Pascal Pocholle
- Area^{1}: 10.04 km^{2} (3.88 sq mi)
- Elevation: 24 m (79 ft)
- Highest elevation: 96 m (315 ft)
- Lowest elevation: 6 m (20 ft)
- Population (2023): 283
  - Density: 28.2/km^{2} (73.0/sq mi)
- Time zone: UTC+01:00 (CET)
  - Summer (DST): UTC+02:00 (CEST)
- INSEE/Postal code: 62551 /62990
- ^{1} French Land Register data, which excludes lakes, ponds, glaciers > 1 km^{2} (0.386 sq mi or 247 acres) and river estuaries.

Marenla (French pronunciation: [maʁɑ̃la]) is a commune in the Pas-de-Calais department in the Hauts-de-France region of France.

== Geography ==
Marenla is situated 5 miles (8 km) southeast of Montreuil-sur-Mer, on the D113 road.

== Population ==
Historical population
Year	Pop.	±% p.a.
1968	263	—
1975	236	−1.54%
1982	222	−0.87%
1990	244	+1.19%
1999	222	−1.04%
2007	217	−0.28%
2012	235	+1.61%
2017	243	+0.67%
2023	283	+2.57%
Source: INSEE

== Places of interest ==
- The church of Saint-Aubin, dating from the seventeenth century.

== See also ==
- Communes of the Pas-de-Calais department
