= Incourt, Pas-de-Calais =

Incourt
- Commune
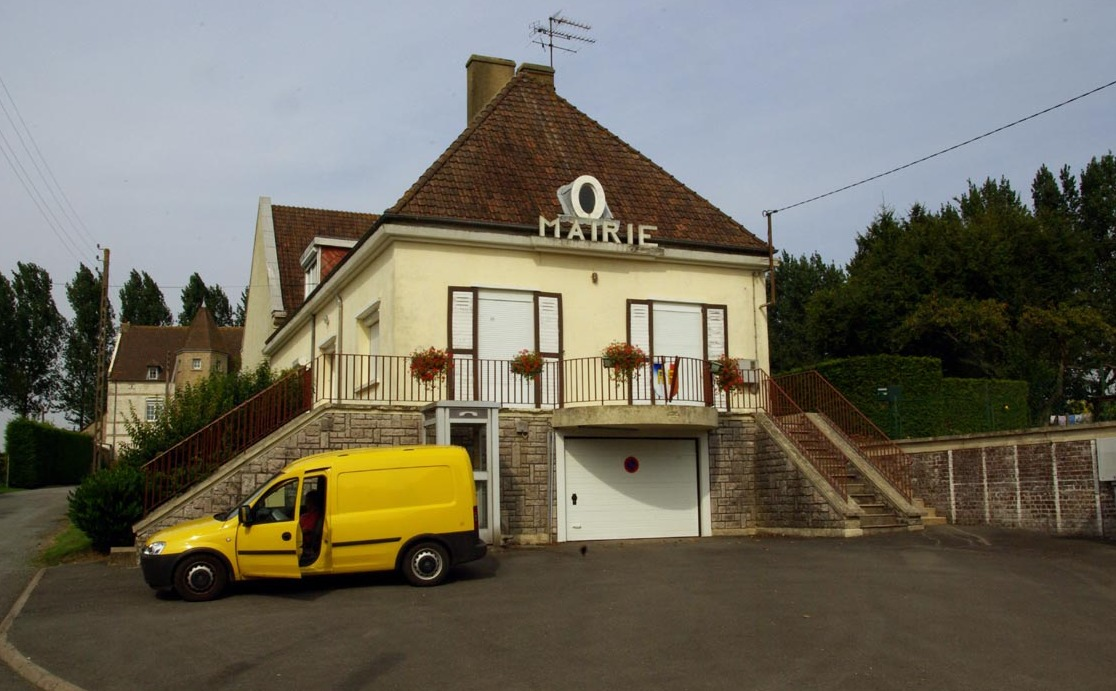
- The town hall of Incourt

- Coat of arms
- Location of Incourt
- Location within France Location within Hauts-de-France
- Coordinates: 50°23′29″N 2°09′10″E
- Country: France
- Region: Hauts-de-France
- Department: Pas-de-Calais
- Arrondissement: Montreuil
- Canton: Auxi-le-Château
- Intercommunality: CC des 7 Vallées

Government
  - Mayor (2020–2026): Bernard Dubois
- Area^{1}: 1.82 km^{2} (0.70 sq mi)
- Elevation: 92 m (302 ft)
- Highest elevation: 115 m (377 ft)
- Lowest elevation: 65 m (213 ft)
- Population (2023): 91
  - Density: 50/km^{2} (130/sq mi)
- Time zone: UTC+01:00 (CET)
  - Summer (DST): UTC+02:00 (CEST)
- INSEE/Postal code: 62470 /62770
- ^{1} French Land Register data, which excludes lakes, ponds, glaciers > 1 km^{2} (0.386 sq mi or 247 acres) and river estuaries.

Incourt (French pronunciation: [ɛ̃kuʁ]) is a commune in the Pas-de-Calais department in the Hauts-de-France region of France.

== Geography ==
Incourt is a small village situated approximately 20 miles (32 km) southeast of Montreuil-sur-Mer on the D107 road.

== Population ==
Historical population
Year	Pop.	±% p.a.
1968	119	—
1975	126	+0.82%
1982	123	−0.34%
1990	104	−2.08%
1999	92	−1.35%
2007	92	+0.00%
2012	62	−7.59%
2017	86	+6.76%
2023	91	+0.95%
Source: INSEE

== Places of interest ==
- Church of St. Martin, which dates from the sixteenth century.

== See also ==
- Communes of the Pas-de-Calais department
