= Marles-sur-Canche =

- Commune
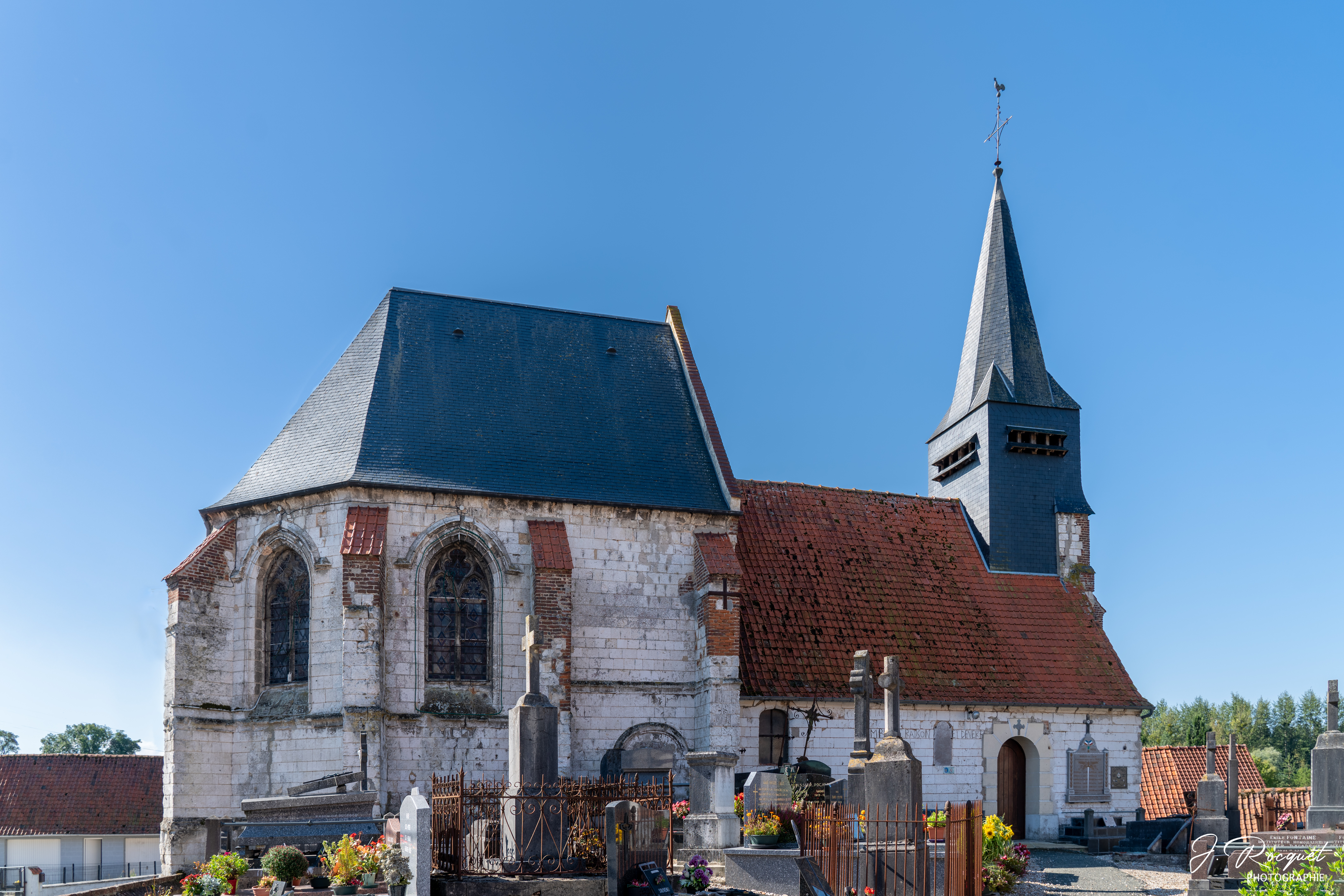
- The church of Marles-sur-Canche

- Coat of arms
- Location of Marles-sur-Canche
- Location within France Location within Hauts-de-France
- Coordinates: 50°27′31″N 1°49′41″E
- Country: France
- Region: Hauts-de-France
- Department: Pas-de-Calais
- Arrondissement: Montreuil
- Canton: Auxi-le-Château
- Intercommunality: CC des 7 Vallées

Government
  - Mayor (2020–2026): Joël Davesne
- Area^{1}: 5.1 km^{2} (2.0 sq mi)
- Elevation: 46 m (151 ft)
- Highest elevation: 79 m (259 ft)
- Lowest elevation: 5 m (16 ft)
- Population (2023): 314
  - Density: 62/km^{2} (160/sq mi)
- Time zone: UTC+01:00 (CET)
  - Summer (DST): UTC+02:00 (CEST)
- INSEE/Postal code: 62556 /62170
- ^{1} French Land Register data, which excludes lakes, ponds, glaciers > 1 km^{2} (0.386 sq mi or 247 acres) and river estuaries.

Marles-sur-Canche (French pronunciation: [maʁl syʁ kɑ̃ʃ], literally Marles on Canche) is a commune in the Pas-de-Calais department in the Hauts-de-France region of France.

== Geography ==
Marles-sur-Canche is situated in the valley of the Canche river, 2.3 miles (4 km) southeast of Montreuil-sur-Mer, on the D113 road.

== Population ==
Historical population
Year	Pop.	±% p.a.
1968	268	—
1975	259	−0.49%
1982	274	+0.81%
1990	293	+0.84%
1999	294	+0.04%
2007	296	+0.08%
2012	284	−0.82%
2017	299	+1.03%
2023	314	+0.82%
Source: INSEE

== Places of interest ==
- The seventeenth century church of St. Firmin.

== See also ==
- Communes of the Pas-de-Calais department
