= Guigny =

- Commune
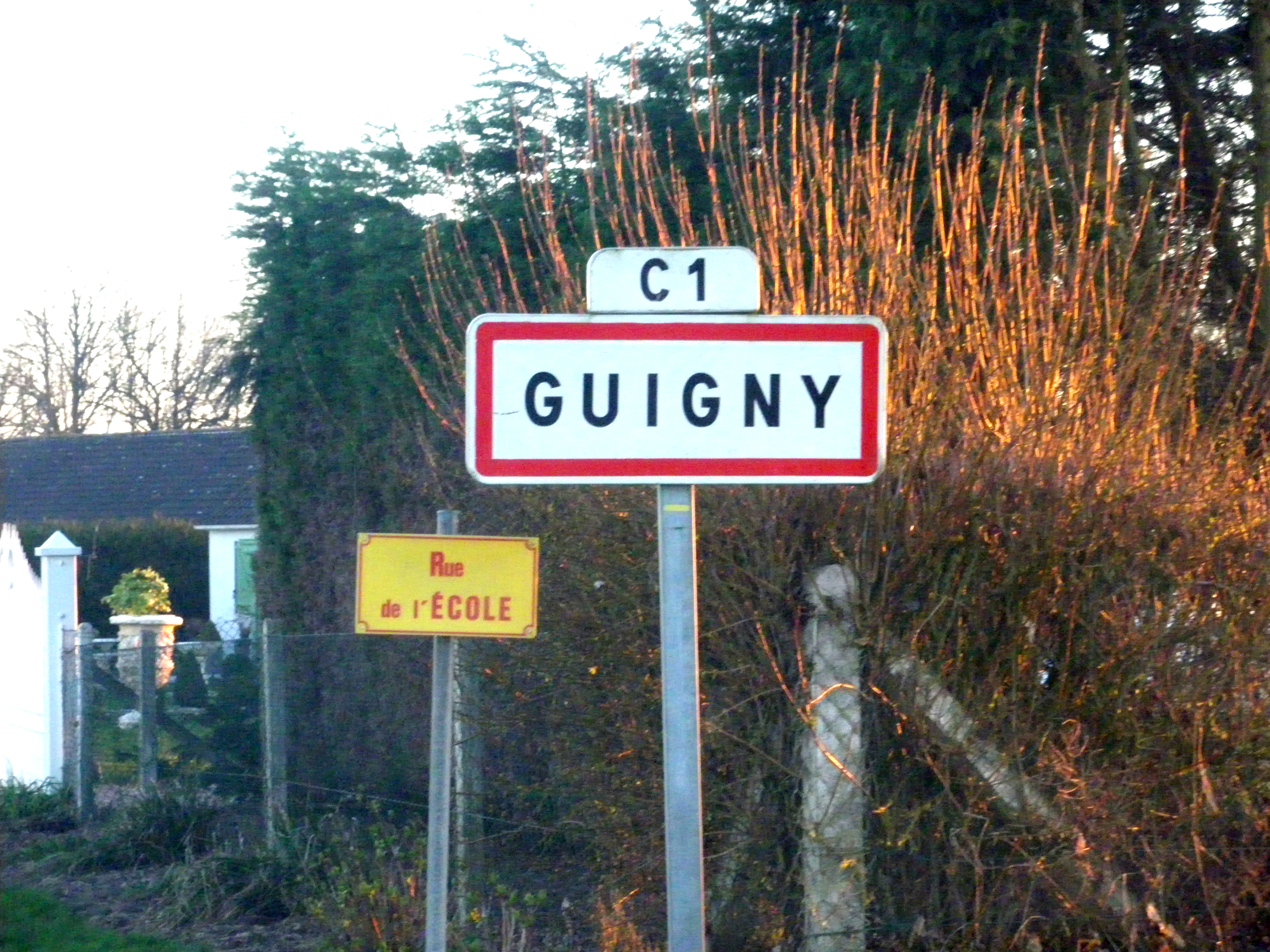
- A road sign at the entry to Guigny

- Coat of arms
- Location of Guigny
- Location within France Location within Hauts-de-France
- Coordinates: 50°19′50″N 1°59′59″E
- Country: France
- Region: Hauts-de-France
- Department: Pas-de-Calais
- Arrondissement: Montreuil
- Canton: Auxi-le-Château
- Intercommunality: CC des 7 Vallées

Government
  - Mayor (2020–2026): Michel Colliez
- Area^{1}: 3.6 km^{2} (1.4 sq mi)
- Elevation: 84 m (276 ft)
- Highest elevation: 110 m (360 ft)
- Lowest elevation: 32 m (105 ft)
- Population (2023): 149
  - Density: 41/km^{2} (110/sq mi)
- Time zone: UTC+01:00 (CET)
  - Summer (DST): UTC+02:00 (CEST)
- INSEE/Postal code: 62395 /62140
- ^{1} French Land Register data, which excludes lakes, ponds, glaciers > 1 km^{2} (0.386 sq mi or 247 acres) and river estuaries.

Guigny (French pronunciation: [ɡiɲi]) is a commune in the Pas-de-Calais department in the Hauts-de-France region of France.

== Geography ==
A village situated some 14 miles (22 km) southeast of Montreuil-sur-Mer on the D134E1 road.

== Population ==
Historical population
Year	Pop.	±% p.a.
1968	127	—
1975	96	−3.92%
1982	108	+1.70%
1990	140	+3.30%
1999	140	+0.00%
2007	156	+1.36%
2012	173	+2.09%
2017	139	−4.28%
2023	149	+1.16%
Source: INSEE

== See also ==
- Communes of the Pas-de-Calais department
