= Capelle-lès-Hesdin =

- Commune
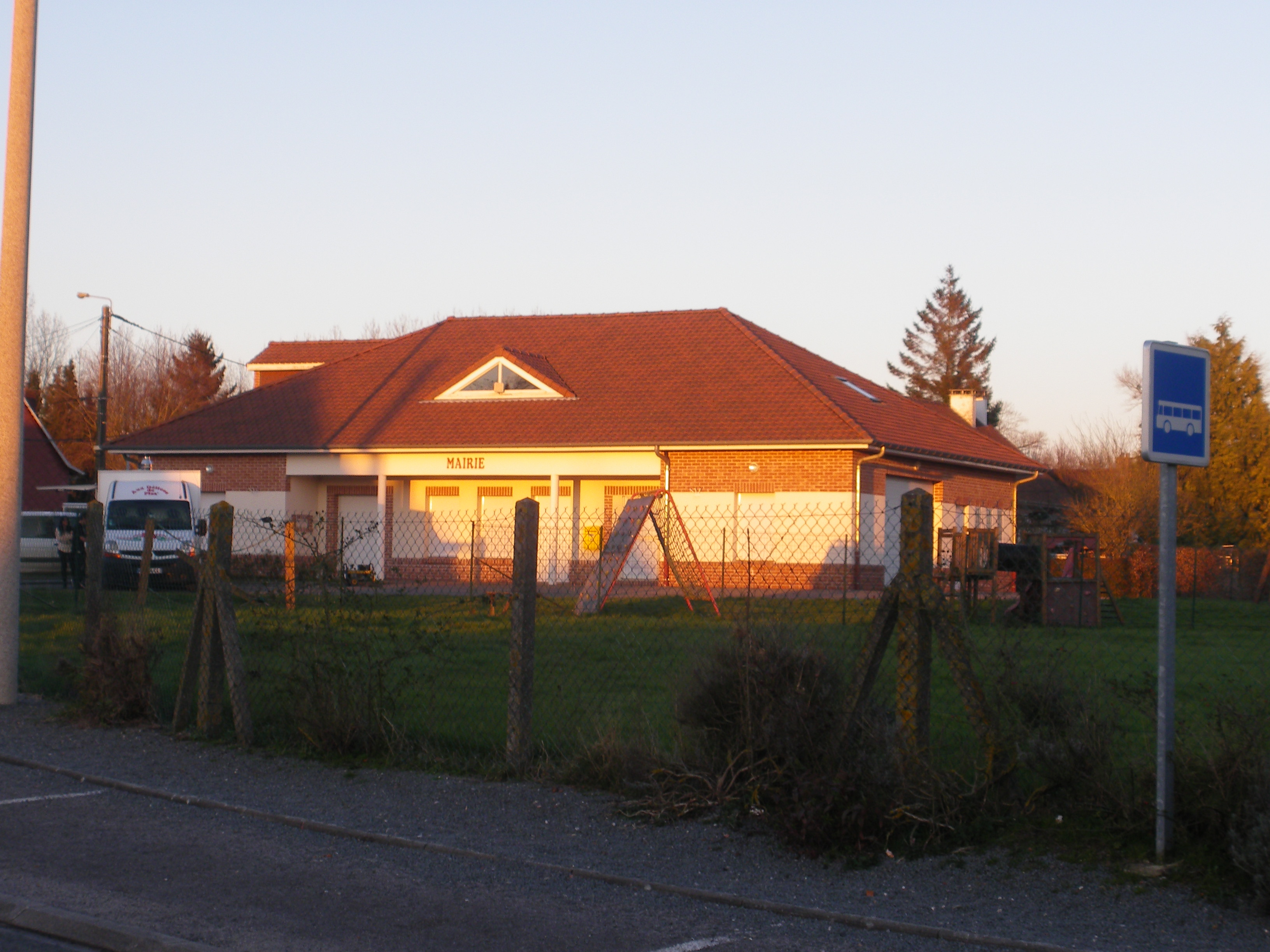
- The town hall of Capelle-lès-Hesdin

- Coat of arms
- Location of Capelle-lès-Hesdin
- Location within France Location within Hauts-de-France
- Coordinates: 50°20′32″N 1°59′52″E
- Country: France
- Region: Hauts-de-France
- Department: Pas-de-Calais
- Arrondissement: Montreuil
- Canton: Auxi-le-Château
- Intercommunality: CC des 7 Vallées

Government
  - Mayor (2020–2026): Francis Capron
- Area^{1}: 5.56 km^{2} (2.15 sq mi)
- Elevation: 102 m (335 ft)
- Highest elevation: 131 m (430 ft)
- Lowest elevation: 65 m (213 ft)
- Population (2023): 474
  - Density: 85.3/km^{2} (221/sq mi)
- Time zone: UTC+01:00 (CET)
  - Summer (DST): UTC+02:00 (CEST)
- INSEE/Postal code: 62212 /62140
- ^{1} French Land Register data, which excludes lakes, ponds, glaciers > 1 km^{2} (0.386 sq mi or 247 acres) and river estuaries.

Capelle-lès-Hesdin (French pronunciation: [kapɛl lɛz‿edɛ̃], literally Capelle near Hesdin) is a commune in the Pas-de-Calais department in the Hauts-de-France region of France.

== Geography ==
A village situated some 17 miles (27 km) southeast of Montreuil-sur-Mer on the D134 road.

== Population ==
Historical population
Year	Pop.	±% p.a.
1968	307	—
1975	317	+0.46%
1982	339	+0.96%
1990	367	+1.00%
1999	407	+1.16%
2007	449	+1.24%
2012	450	+0.04%
2017	485	+1.51%
2023	474	−0.38%
Source: INSEE

== See also ==
- Communes of the Pas-de-Calais department
