= Aubin-Saint-Vaast =

- Commune
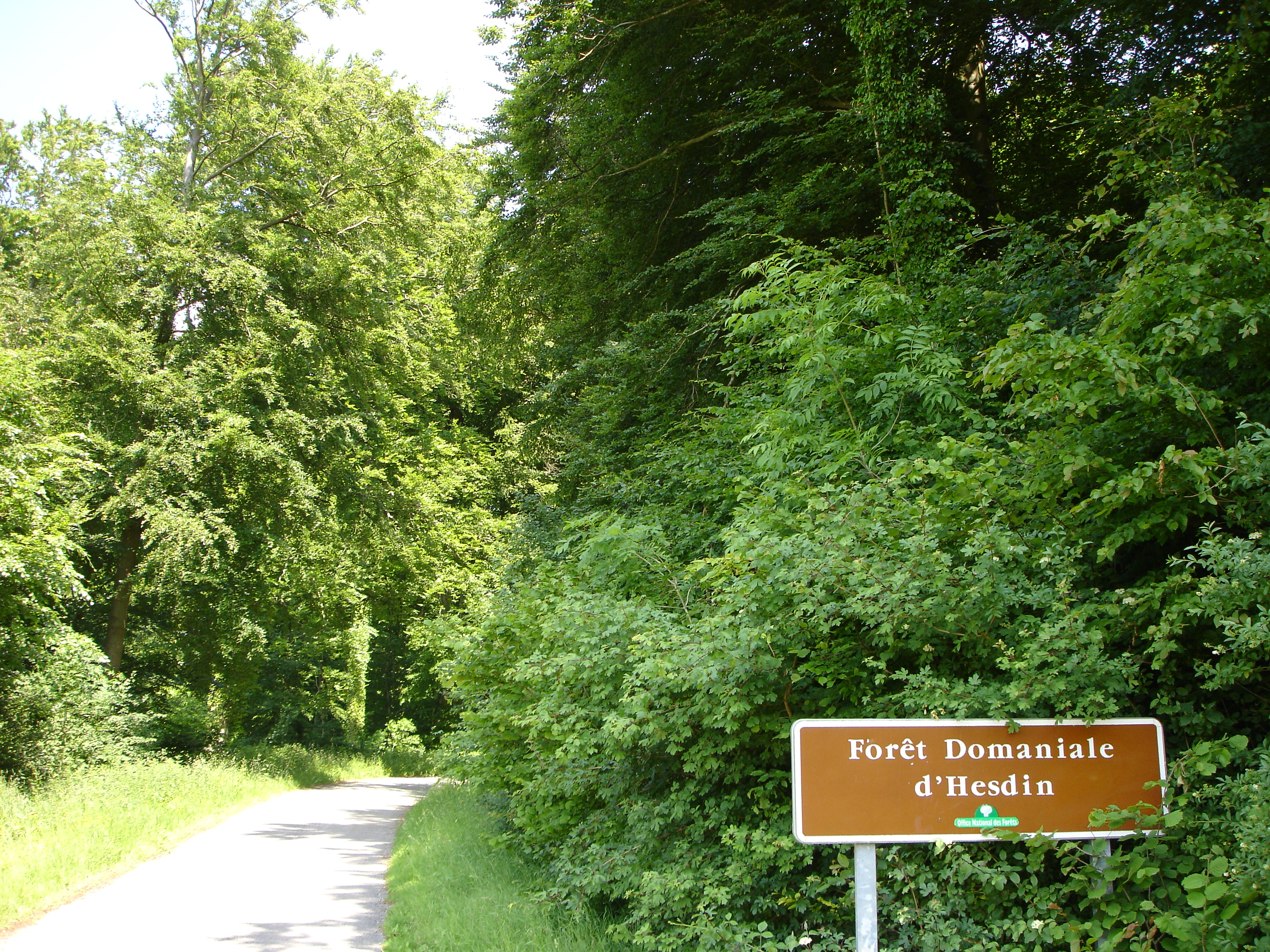
- The entrance to the forest of Hesdin

- Coat of arms
- Location of Aubin-Saint-Vaast
- Location within France Location within Hauts-de-France
- Coordinates: 50°23′46″N 1°58′26″E
- Country: France
- Region: Hauts-de-France
- Department: Pas-de-Calais
- Arrondissement: Montreuil
- Canton: Auxi-le-Château
- Intercommunality: CC des 7 Vallées

Government
  - Mayor (2020–2026): Steve Pringarbe
- Area^{1}: 6.7 km^{2} (2.6 sq mi)
- Elevation: 24 m (79 ft)
- Highest elevation: 119 m (390 ft)
- Lowest elevation: 17 m (56 ft)
- Population (2023): 733
  - Density: 110/km^{2} (280/sq mi)
- Time zone: UTC+01:00 (CET)
  - Summer (DST): UTC+02:00 (CEST)
- INSEE/Postal code: 62046 /62140
- ^{1} French Land Register data, which excludes lakes, ponds, glaciers > 1 km^{2} (0.386 sq mi or 247 acres) and river estuaries.

Aubin-Saint-Vaast is a commune in the Pas-de-Calais department in northern France.

== Population ==
Historical population
| Year | Pop. | ±% p.a. |
|---|---|---|
| 1968 | 678 | — |
| 1975 | 708 | +0.62% |
| 1982 | 735 | +0.54% |
| 1990 | 710 | −0.43% |
| 1999 | 756 | +0.70% |
| 2007 | 795 | +0.63% |
| 2012 | 735 | −1.56% |
| 2017 | 759 | +0.64% |
| 2023 | 733 | −0.58% |
Source: INSEE

== Sights ==
- The church

== See also ==
- Communes of Pas-de-Calais
