= Wamin =

- Commune
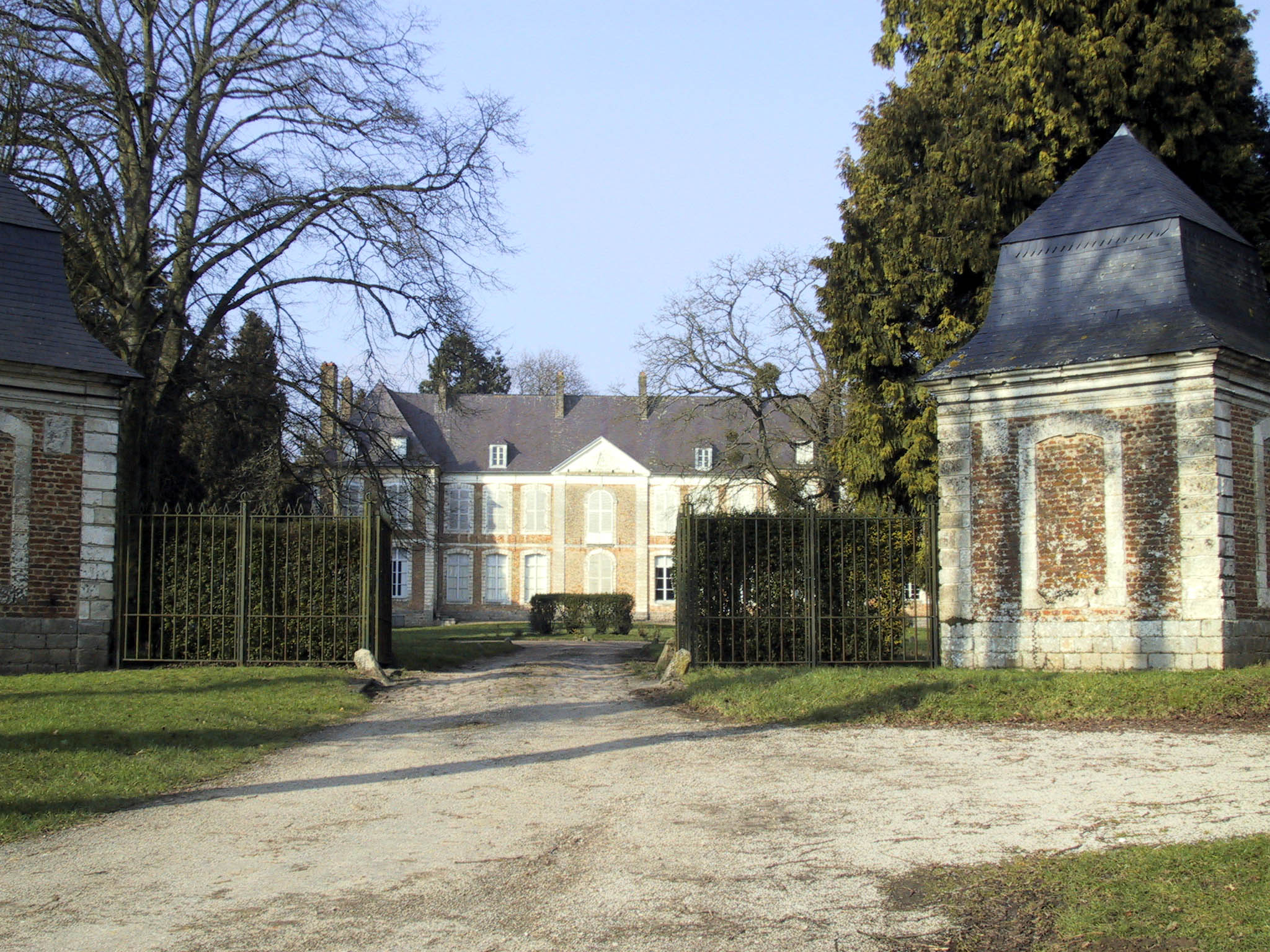
- Château de Wamin

- Coat of arms
- Location of Wamin
- Location within France Location within Hauts-de-France
- Coordinates: 50°24′51″N 2°03′41″E
- Country: France
- Region: Hauts-de-France
- Department: Pas-de-Calais
- Arrondissement: Montreuil
- Canton: Auxi-le-Château
- Intercommunality: CC des 7 Vallées

Government
  - Mayor (2020–2026): Philippe Lejosne
- Area^{1}: 7.2 km^{2} (2.8 sq mi)
- Highest elevation: 122 m (400 ft)
- Lowest elevation: 54 m (177 ft)
- Population (2023): 253
  - Density: 35/km^{2} (91/sq mi)
- Time zone: UTC+01:00 (CET)
  - Summer (DST): UTC+02:00 (CEST)
- INSEE/Postal code: 62872 /62770
- ^{1} French Land Register data, which excludes lakes, ponds, glaciers > 1 km^{2} (0.386 sq mi or 247 acres) and river estuaries.

Wamin (French pronunciation: [wamɛ̃]) is a commune in the department of Pas-de-Calais in the Nord-Pas de Calais region in France of France. It lies 5 km north of Hesdin and 24 km east of Montreuil.

== Main sights ==
The church of Our Lady of Assumption was constructed in 1664 of brick and stone, in typical regional style. The first Lords of Wamin are buried under the choir.

The château was built in the 17th century by François de Fléchin who had inherited, through marriage, the titles of the Créquy family and was elevated to Marquis in 1693. Sold in 1811 by the daughters of the Marquis of Fléchin to the family of Lefebvre de Gouy de Milly.

== Population ==
Historical population
| Year | Pop. | ±% p.a. |
|---|---|---|
| 1968 | 273 | — |
| 1975 | 217 | −3.23% |
| 1982 | 272 | +3.28% |
| 1990 | 276 | +0.18% |
| 1999 | 263 | −0.53% |
| 2007 | 253 | −0.48% |
| 2012 | 242 | −0.89% |
| 2017 | 237 | −0.42% |
| 2023 | 253 | +1.09% |
Source: INSEE

== See also ==
- Communes of the Pas-de-Calais department
