= Marant =

- Commune
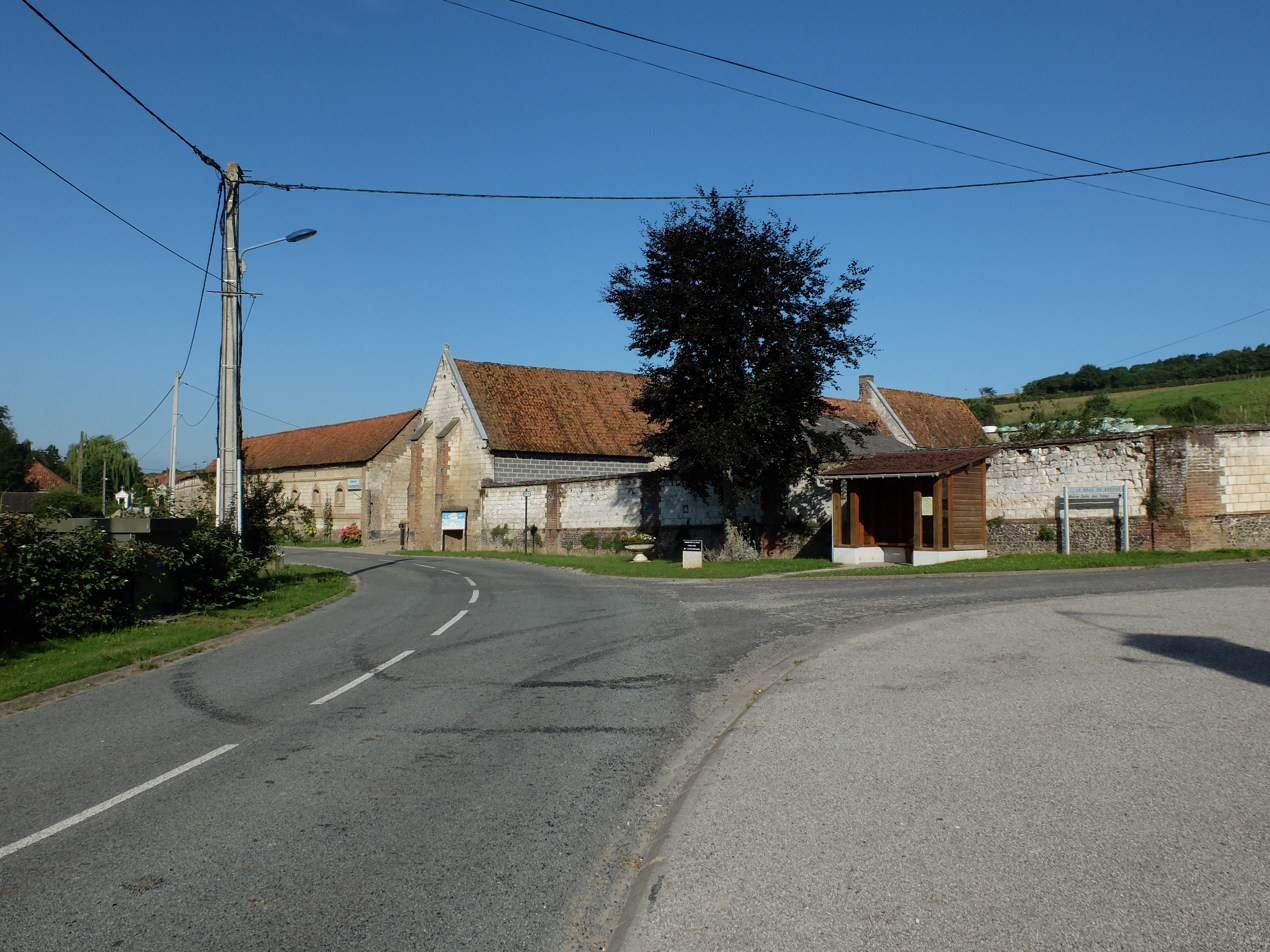
- The centre of Marant

- Coat of arms
- Location of Marant
- Location within France Location within Hauts-de-France
- Coordinates: 50°28′02″N 1°50′45″E
- Country: France
- Region: Hauts-de-France
- Department: Pas-de-Calais
- Arrondissement: Montreuil
- Canton: Auxi-le-Château
- Intercommunality: CC des 7 Vallées

Government
  - Mayor (2020–2026): Dany Bouchard
- Area^{1}: 3.88 km^{2} (1.50 sq mi)
- Elevation: 23 m (75 ft)
- Highest elevation: 96 m (315 ft)
- Lowest elevation: 10 m (33 ft)
- Population (2023): 73
  - Density: 19/km^{2} (49/sq mi)
- Time zone: UTC+01:00 (CET)
  - Summer (DST): UTC+02:00 (CEST)
- INSEE/Postal code: 62547 /62170
- ^{1} French Land Register data, which excludes lakes, ponds, glaciers > 1 km^{2} (0.386 sq mi or 247 acres) and river estuaries.

Marant (French pronunciation: [maʁɑ̃]) is a commune in the Pas-de-Calais department in the Hauts-de-France region of France.

== Geography ==
Marant is situated 3 miles (5 km) east of Montreuil-sur-Mer, on the D129 road.

== Population ==
Historical population
Year	Pop.	±% p.a.
1968	105	—
1975	83	−3.30%
1982	77	−1.07%
1990	86	+1.39%
1999	86	+0.00%
2007	70	−2.54%
2012	83	+3.47%
2017	66	−4.48%
2023	73	+1.69%
Source: INSEE

== See also ==
- Communes of the Pas-de-Calais department
