= Regnauville =

- Commune
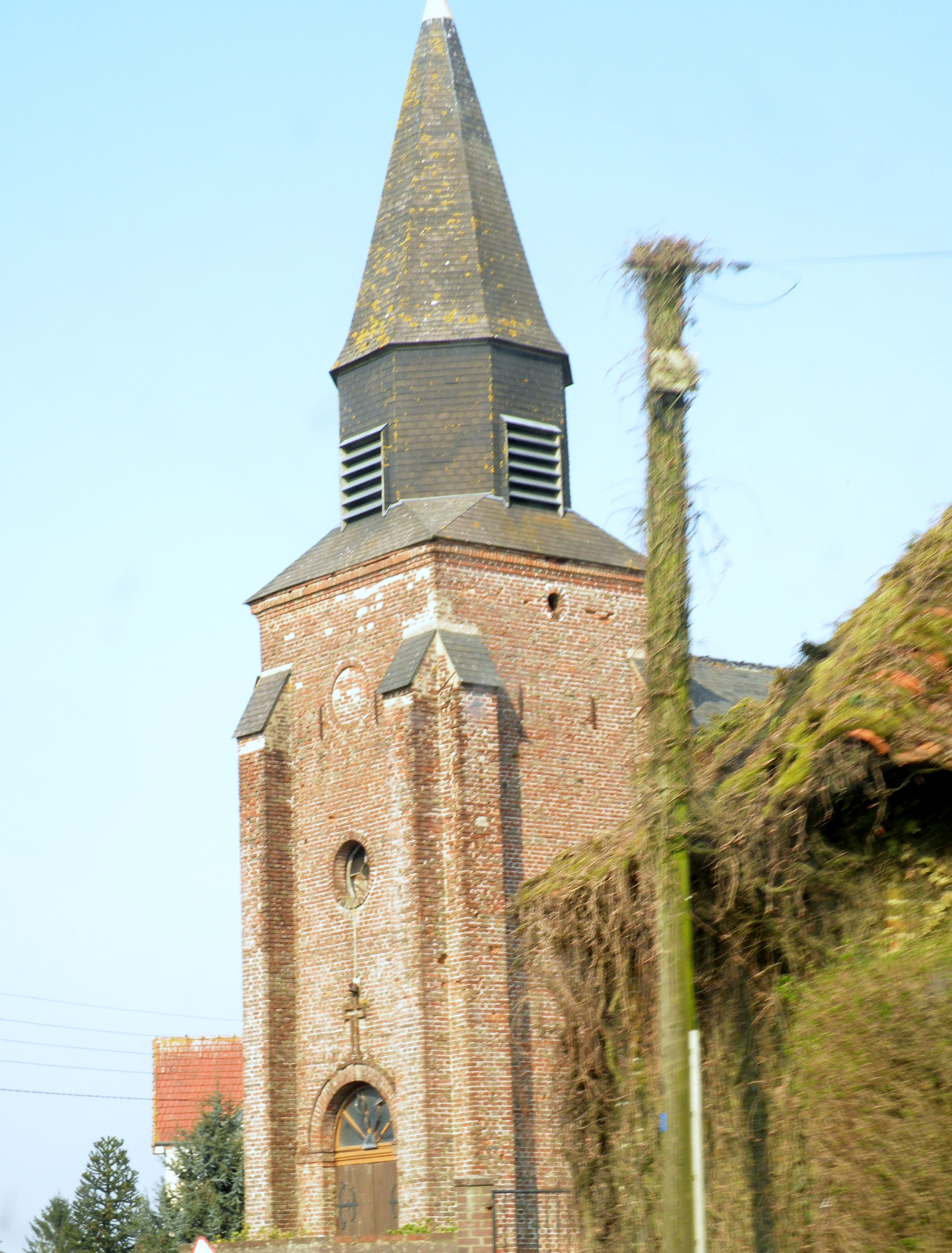
- The church of Regnauville

- Coat of arms
- Location of Regnauville
- Location within France Location within Hauts-de-France
- Coordinates: 50°18′52″N 2°00′44″E
- Country: France
- Region: Hauts-de-France
- Department: Pas-de-Calais
- Arrondissement: Montreuil
- Canton: Auxi-le-Château
- Intercommunality: CC des 7 Vallées

Government
  - Mayor (2020–2026): Jean-Michel Cruppe
- Area^{1}: 4.17 km^{2} (1.61 sq mi)
- Elevation: 115 m (377 ft)
- Highest elevation: 125 m (410 ft)
- Lowest elevation: 32 m (105 ft)
- Population (2023): 213
  - Density: 51.1/km^{2} (132/sq mi)
- Time zone: UTC+01:00 (CET)
  - Summer (DST): UTC+02:00 (CEST)
- INSEE/Postal code: 62700 /62140
- ^{1} French Land Register data, which excludes lakes, ponds, glaciers > 1 km^{2} (0.386 sq mi or 247 acres) and river estuaries.

Regnauville (French pronunciation: [ʁəɲovil]) is a commune in the Pas-de-Calais department in the Hauts-de-France region of France.

== Geography ==
Regnauville is located 18 miles (29 km) southeast of Montreuil-sur-Mer on the D928 road.

== Population ==
Historical population
Year	Pop.	±% p.a.
1968	231	—
1975	213	−1.15%
1982	224	+0.72%
1990	210	−0.80%
1999	210	+0.00%
2007	226	+0.92%
2012	215	−0.99%
2017	213	−0.19%
2023	213	+0.00%
Source: INSEE

== Places of interest ==
- The church of St.Jacques, dating from the sixteenth century.
- A cheesemakers

== See also ==
- Communes of the Pas-de-Calais department
