= Canton of Hucqueliers =

Coordinates: 50.56944°N 1.90722°E

Hucqueliers
- Former canton
- Interactive map of Hucqueliers
- Country: France
- Region: Hauts-de-France
- Department: Pas-de-Calais
- No. of communes: {{{nbcomm}}}
- Disbanded: 2015
- Area: 231.71 km^{2} (89.46 sq mi)
- Population (2012): 8,182
  - Density: 35.31/km^{2} (91.46/sq mi)

The Canton of Hucqueliers is a former canton situated in the Pas-de-Calais département and in the Nord-Pas-de-Calais region of France. It was disbanded following the French canton reorganisation which came into effect in March 2015. It consisted of 24 communes, which joined the canton of Lumbres in 2015. It had a total of 8,182 inhabitants (2012).

== Geography ==
An area of small valleys and plateaux, consisting mostly of farmland, with the town of Hucqueliers in the arrondissement of Montreuil at its centre. The altitude varies from 26m (Alette) to 202m (Bécourt).with an average altitude of 97m.

The canton comprised 24 communes:

- Aix-en-Ergny
- Alette
- Avesnes
- Bécourt
- Beussent
- Bezinghem
- Bimont
- Bourthes
- Campagne-lès-Boulonnais
- Clenleu
- Enquin-sur-Baillons
- Ergny
- Herly
- Hucqueliers
- Humbert
- Maninghem
- Parenty
- Preures
- Quilen
- Rumilly
- Saint-Michel-sous-Bois
- Verchocq
- Wicquinghem
- Zoteux

== Population ==
Population development
| 1962 | 1968 | 1975 | 1982 | 1990 | 1999 |
|---|---|---|---|---|---|
| 6991 | 7337 | 7013 | 7016 | 6747 | 6546 |
Census count starting from 1962 : Population without double counting

== See also ==
- Cantons of Pas-de-Calais
- Communes of Pas-de-Calais
