= Canton of Étaples =

Coordinates: 50.51861°N 1.64139°E

Étaples
- Canton
- Location of Étaples within the department
- Country: France
- Region: Hauts-de-France
- Department: Pas-de-Calais
- No. of communes: {{{nbcomm}}}
- Area: 177.27 km^{2} (68.44 sq mi)
- Population (2023): 30,550
  - Density: 172.3/km^{2} (446.3/sq mi)
- INSEE code: 6224

The canton of Étaples is a canton situated in the Pas-de-Calais département and in the Hauts-de-France region of France.

== Geography ==
An area of coastland, small valleys and plateaux, consisting mostly of seaside and farmland, with the town of Étaples in the arrondissement of Montreuil at its centre.

== Composition ==
At the French canton reorganisation which came into effect in March 2015, the canton was reduced from 19 to 15 communes:

- Bréxent-Énocq
- Camiers
- Cormont
- Cucq
- Étaples
- Frencq
- Lefaux
- Longvilliers
- Maresville
- Merlimont
- Saint-Aubin
- Saint-Josse
- Le Touquet-Paris-Plage
- Tubersent
- Widehem

== Population ==
Historical population
Year	Pop.	±% p.a.
2013	31,204	—
2018	30,987	−0.14%
Source: INSEE

== See also ==
- Cantons of Pas-de-Calais
- Communes of Pas-de-Calais
