= Longvilliers =

Longvilliers may refer to several communes in France:

- Longvilliers, Pas-de-Calais
- Longvilliers, Yvelines
