= Cormont =

- Commune
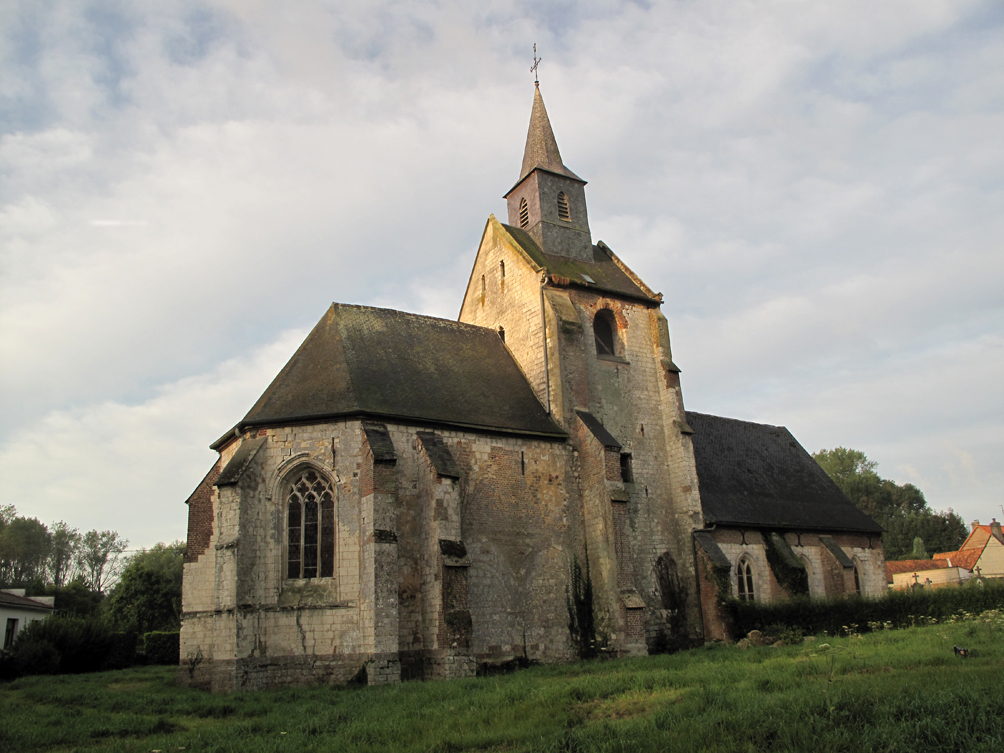
- The church of Cormont

- Coat of arms
- Location of Cormont
- Location within France Location within Hauts-de-France
- Coordinates: 50°33′44″N 1°44′10″E
- Country: France
- Region: Hauts-de-France
- Department: Pas-de-Calais
- Arrondissement: Montreuil
- Canton: Étaples
- Intercommunality: CA Deux Baies en Montreuillois

Government
  - Mayor (2020–2026): Emile Crepin
- Area^{1}: 9.71 km^{2} (3.75 sq mi)
- Elevation: 45 m (148 ft)
- Highest elevation: 119 m (390 ft)
- Lowest elevation: 30 m (98 ft)
- Population (2023): 309
  - Density: 31.8/km^{2} (82.4/sq mi)
- Time zone: UTC+01:00 (CET)
  - Summer (DST): UTC+02:00 (CEST)
- INSEE/Postal code: 62241 /62630
- ^{1} French Land Register data, which excludes lakes, ponds, glaciers > 1 km^{2} (0.386 sq mi or 247 acres) and river estuaries.

Cormont (French pronunciation: [kɔʁmɔ̃]) is a commune in the Pas-de-Calais department in the Hauts-de-France region of France about 12 miles (19 km) southeast of Boulogne-sur-Mer.

== History ==
Mentioned first in 826, as "Curmons".

== Population ==
Historical population
Year	Pop.	±% p.a.
1968	237	—
1975	230	−0.43%
1982	236	+0.37%
1990	227	−0.48%
1999	250	+1.08%
2007	281	+1.47%
2012	318	+2.50%
2017	319	+0.06%
2023	309	−0.53%
Source: INSEE

== See also ==
- Communes of the Pas-de-Calais department
