= Éclimeux =

- Commune
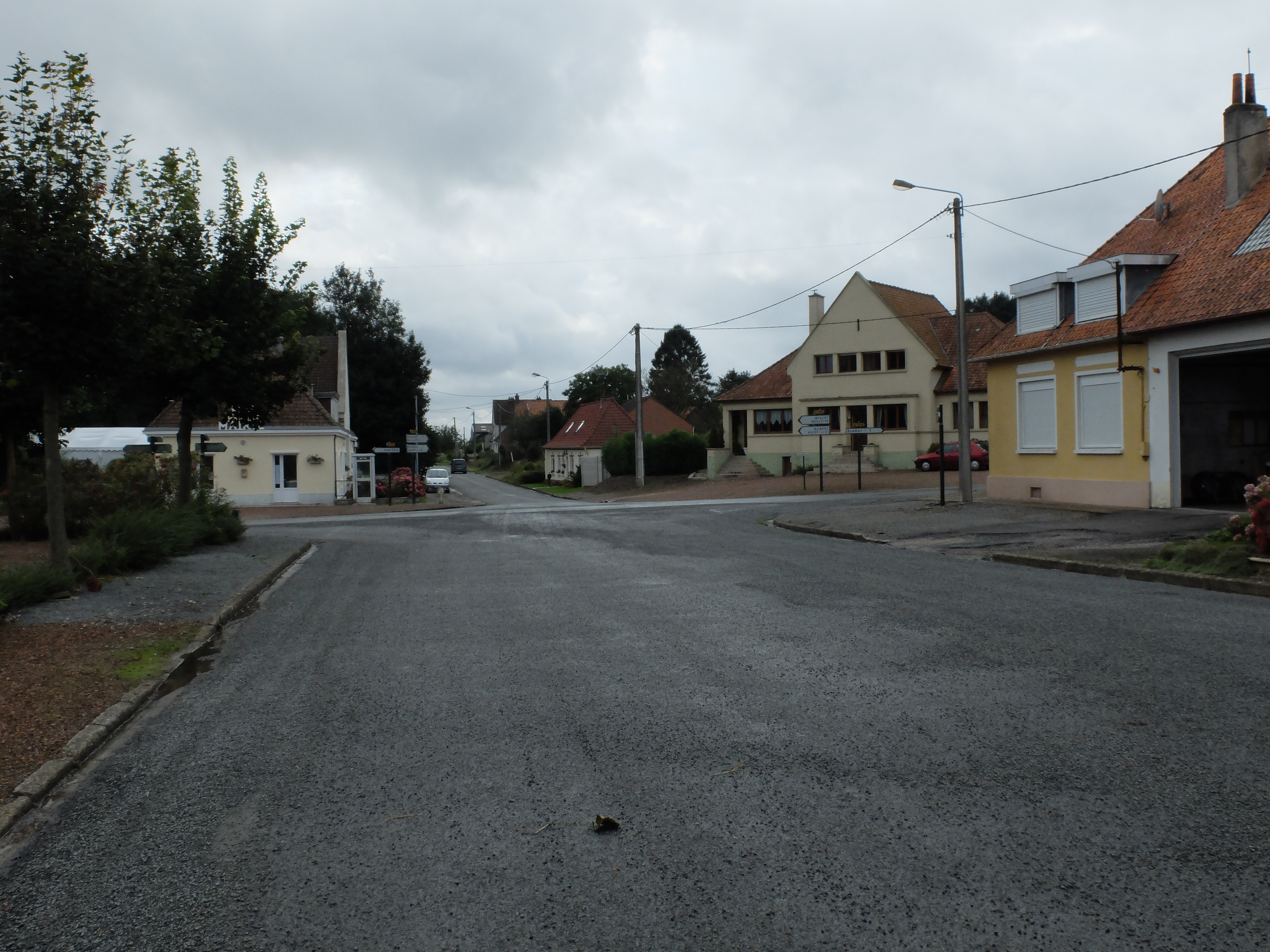
- The centre of Éclimeux

- Coat of arms
- Location of Éclimeux
- Location within France Location within Hauts-de-France
- Coordinates: 50°23′56″N 2°10′50″E
- Country: France
- Region: Hauts-de-France
- Department: Pas-de-Calais
- Arrondissement: Montreuil
- Canton: Auxi-le-Château
- Intercommunality: CC des 7 Vallées

Government
  - Mayor (2020–2026): Christophe Degrendele
- Area^{1}: 6.03 km^{2} (2.33 sq mi)
- Elevation: 116 m (381 ft)
- Highest elevation: 126 m (413 ft)
- Lowest elevation: 82 m (269 ft)
- Population (2023): 178
  - Density: 29.5/km^{2} (76.5/sq mi)
- Time zone: UTC+01:00 (CET)
  - Summer (DST): UTC+02:00 (CEST)
- INSEE/Postal code: 62282 /62770
- ^{1} French Land Register data, which excludes lakes, ponds, glaciers > 1 km^{2} (0.386 sq mi or 247 acres) and river estuaries.

Éclimeux (French pronunciation: [eklimø]) is a commune in the Pas-de-Calais department in the Hauts-de-France region of France about 5 miles (8 km) east of Hesdin.

== Population ==
Historical population
Year	Pop.	±% p.a.
1968	216	—
1975	172	−3.20%
1982	176	+0.33%
1990	155	−1.58%
1999	162	+0.49%
2007	161	−0.08%
2012	170	+1.09%
2017	176	+0.70%
2023	178	+0.19%
Source: INSEE

== See also ==
- Communes of the Pas-de-Calais department
