= Wailly-Beaucamp =

- Commune
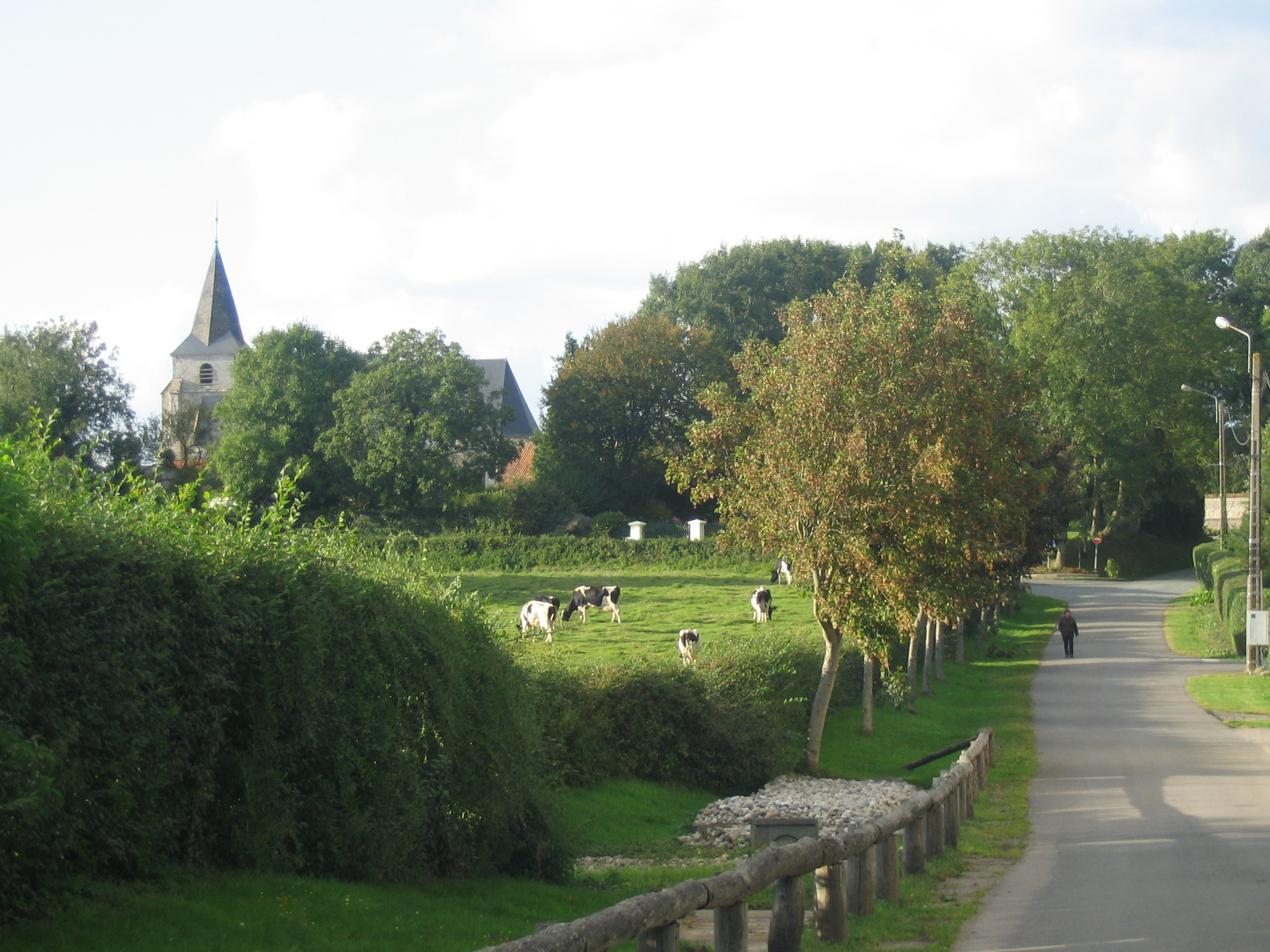
- A general view of Wailly-Beaucamp

- Coat of arms
- Location of Wailly-Beaucamp
- Location within France Location within Hauts-de-France
- Coordinates: 50°24′50″N 1°43′37″E
- Country: France
- Region: Hauts-de-France
- Department: Pas-de-Calais
- Arrondissement: Montreuil
- Canton: Berck
- Intercommunality: Deux Baies en Montreuillois

Government
  - Mayor (2020–2026): Véronique Graillot
- Area^{1}: 14.33 km^{2} (5.53 sq mi)
- Elevation: 84 m (276 ft)
- Highest elevation: 68 m (223 ft)
- Lowest elevation: 18 m (59 ft)
- Population (2023): 1,062
  - Density: 74.11/km^{2} (191.9/sq mi)
- Time zone: UTC+01:00 (CET)
  - Summer (DST): UTC+02:00 (CEST)
- INSEE/Postal code: 62870 /62170
- ^{1} French Land Register data, which excludes lakes, ponds, glaciers > 1 km^{2} (0.386 sq mi or 247 acres) and river estuaries.

Wailly-Beaucamp (French pronunciation: [waji bokɑ̃]) is a commune in the Pas-de-Calais department in the Hauts-de-France region of France.

The inhabitants of Wailly-Beaucamp are known as Wailly-Beaucampiens in French.

== Geography ==
Wailly-Beaucamp is situated 6 km (3.7 mi) south of Montreuil-sur-Mer, 15 km (9.3 mi) east of Berck-sur-Mer and 20 km (12 mi) from Le Touquet, on the plateau between the valleys of the Canche and the Authie. The town is crossed by the former Route-Nationale 1 (N1) linking Boulogne-sur-Mer to Paris and is served by junction 25 of autoroute A16. Nearby towns and villages include: Boisjean, Lépine, Verton, Airon-Saint-Vaast, Campigneulles-les-Grandes, Campigneulles-les-Petites and Ecuires. The nature of the local geology lends itself to sand and gravel extraction.

== Local place-names and hamlets ==
- Beaucamp. This hamlet was given its name in 1901, on the initial creation of ‘Wailly-Beaucamp’.
- La Réderie.
- Le Mouflet ou Moufflet. Also called Mont-Ruflel in 1311 or Mont-Riflet in 1337. Tradition says that Mouflet was named in homage to the young Dauphin Louis XVII who, when imprisoned, did not want his dog Mouflet to be imprisoned too.
- La Houssoye. The name comes from the Picard word houshe, which means bosquet in French and spinney in English. There are other Houssoyes in the region: Houssoie at Parenty, Bellebrune and Buire-le-Sec. (From Abbé Haigneré: Histoire de l'arrondissement de Boulogne).
- Le Point du Jour.
- Le Halloy.
- Les Champs Rayés.
- Les Rives.
- Le Mont-Guislain.
- Les Fonds de Wailly.
- Le Monthodion or Montaudion. According to Monsieur Albert Leroy, Montaudion was the name of an old Picardy family.
- Les Garennes.

== Etymology ==
We don't really know the origin of the name Wailly. Place-names in France were subject to intensive research during the 19th century. Wailly didn't escape the investigations. Here are some hypotheses:

- From Monsieur Harbaville, Wailly is from the Latin vallis, (French : vallon. Eng: little valley)
- R. Rodière judged this hypothesis probable, given the geographical position of the village.

Walliacum, is Galliacum, caused by mutation of W to G. 'Gallus ->Gaullois, Wailly being a border village of Picardy and therefore, of France.

- According to L. Ricouart, Wailliacum, a little ford
- In the Cueilloir de l'Hôtel-Dieu de Montreuil (15th-century manuscript), in the article entitled Wailly, there's a curious drawing of a dog that is barking Wail, wail.

The changing spellings of the name Wailly :

- 11th-12th century - Uali, Codex traditionum Sancti georgii Hisdiniensis.'
- 1239 - Walliacum, listed as a member of the commune of Saint-Josse sur Mer.
- 1240 - Walli, - as above.
- 1251 - Velleia, Local map.
- 1311 - Wailli, Fiefdom of Maintenay.
- 1475 - Wailly, Cueilloir de l'Hôtel-Dieu de Montreuil.
- 1495 - Vuailly, Terrier de la commanderie de Loison.
- 15th century - Census of Wally, Carte de l'Artois de J. S. Montensi.
- 1656 - Ouailly,
- 1709 - Wailli, - Map by N. de Fer: Les environs de Boulogne, d'Etaple, de Montreuil, de Montulin, de Rue, et d'Hêdin.
- Around 1750 - Vuailly, in a Catholic Register.
- End of 18th century - Wailly, on Cassini Maps
- 1901 - Wailly became Wailly-Beaucamp (Beaucamp, an adjoining hamlet)

== History ==
=== Medieval Period ===
There's no mention of Wailly before 1143. A certain Wermon, lord of Wailly, signed as witness at the bottom of a map, in 1144. This was the first mention of a village called Wailly, near Montreuil.

=== 18th century ===
8 May 1783 : The death of Adrien du Bus who sold the manor-house of Cossette.

=== 19th and 20th centuries ===
During the French Revolution, the village was spared from any violence, despite the presence of a scaffold on one of Montreuil's squares. The Cossette family didn't leave the château, but Curate Waro preached revolutionary sermons. With the creation of the new départements, Wailly was no longer part of the canton of Waban, but moved to that of Montreuil. During the 19th century, no events of great importance unfolded at Wailly. In 1871 Wailly saw some visiting Prussian soldiers. Five years later, a tornado shook the town and in 1881 saw the arrival of a hot air balloon. From 1891 to 1955, the Berck - Aire-sur-la-Lys railway line crossed the town. This train, called the Le Tortillard, ch'tacot or Ch'tiot train, stopped at Wailly twice a day. Nothing remains of the railway nowadays, except for the station building (now a private dwelling) and a pedestrian footpath linking up the Lombard footpath to the Route Nationale No 1. Because of problems with mail being sent in error to Wailly-les-Arras, it was decided to rechristen the town in 1901. Since then, the hamlet of Beaucamp lent its name to go alongside Wailly, and so was born Wailly-Beaucamp.

The Girls’ school was constructed in 1908, alongside the N1 road. During the Great War, the town paid with the life of 27 of its inhabitants. As with just about everywhere else in France, a war memorial was erected, in 1921, facing the church porch.

== Population ==
Historical population
Year	Pop.	±% p.a.
1968	514	—
1975	598	+2.19%
1982	677	+1.79%
1990	741	+1.14%
1999	779	+0.56%
2007	975	+2.85%
2012	1,018	+0.87%
2017	1,004	−0.28%
2023	1,062	+0.94%
Source: INSEE

== Places and Monuments ==
=== St.Peter’s Church ===
Constructed originally in the 16th century (about 1571) after the war against the Spaniards. We know that it was then dedicated to St. George. The church probably had a second nave, to the north, in line with the lateral chapel. In 1770, during a storm, the tower collapsed but was rebuilt a year later. The lower north side is probably made of brick. During the 19th century, the church was in a very bad state. The Vicomtesse of Cossette first of all proposed to demolish the church and rebuild it, offering 10,000 francs and a gift of land. After the refusal of the town council, the priest, Dubois obtained an estimate from architect Clovis Normand, and in the spring of 1883, work began with the financial assistance of the Vicomtesse. The present church is the product of these restorations. Nothing much of the original sixteenth-century church remains, except for the choir, the nave of three vaults up to the triumphant arch and the lateral chapel. The big nave was therefore rebuilt in the 19th century and the northern nave was demolished. Two arches resting on an octagonal battery in sandstone separate the chapel nave. The furniture was replaced, it was of neogothic style and decorated with biblical scenes and fantasy beasts.

=== Chapels ===
The chapel of Our Lady of the Salette is of neo-Byzantine style, constructed by architect Clovis Normand in 1869. The chapel of Our Lady of Good Death is in the neogothic style, erected by the Bloquel family in 1919.

=== Domestic Architecture ===
The town was generously endowed during the preceding centuries with grand houses and still preserves its rural character thanks to a multitude of Picardy farms. A stately home, former a feudal castle, known as Petite Chateau, constructed in 1701 by the feudal Du Bus family Moufflet chateau, 19th century example of the Empire style of construction. Beaucamp chateau, 19th century. La Houssoie chateau, 19th century. La Tilleuls chateau, 19th century. La Prairière chateau, 19th century. The farm of Monthodion (Albert Leroy, Les Vieilles Fermes du Pays de Montreuil, T1, p. 77) and other Picardy farms.

=== Economy and services ===
· Religious Offices · Library · Primary School · Multiuse Hall · Football pitches and basketball · Post Office · Doctors · Pharmacy · Camping · GuestRooms · Bars and restaurants · Bakery · Butchery · Mechanic and service station · Hairstylist · Plumbers · Joinery · Iron Foundry · Agricultural and Horticultural enterprises · Housing of equipment of work-site. · Quarry and quarrying equipment

== Events ==
The European Meeting of Nature and Hunting, (7000 visitors in 2005, 10000 in 2007)

== Miracles and legends ==
- By Roger Rodière, historian and inhabitant of the village, at the end of the 19th century.

Superstition has it that, in Puit-Bérault woods, sorcerers carried out their satanic rites, right up until the Revolution, which seems somewhat exaggerated. They kept, at Wailly, huge sandstone blocks, called 'Sorcerers’ Rocks', of altar shape, on which, it's claimed, the 'Naudois' cut the throats of their victims. These rocks are in various locations: five to the entry of Wailly, towards Airon; a huge one at the start of the woods and three or four opposite Boidin's wine-shop, at the junction with Church St. Today, these stones have all disappeared.

- Albéric de Calonne tells us of the miracle of St Adrien at Wailly, in the Canton de Montreuil.

"Saint-Adrien the martyr, whose relics were preserved in Haynaut in the city of Grammont, was the object of special worship at Wailly. The Bollandists relate the following: "October 3rd, 1516, Joan Le Fèvre, wife of Jacques du Bois, who lived at Wailly near Montreuil, was gathering vegetables in her garden when her mother, dead for the past 3 years, appeared before her and said: "Joan my girl, be assured, I am your mother. Do you remember that during one of your illnesses we promised to make the pilgrimage to Grammont together? Well, because you didn’t fulfil this engagement, I now suffer cruelly in Purgatory!" The vision disappeared and Joan didn't speak to anyone about it. Eight days later, she was preparing the kitchen fire, when suddenly, her mother appeared again and deprived her of her senses: "Learn this, that there will be no rest for you until you go and revere the relics of St. Adrien at Grammont!" The unfortunate woman, deprived of her senses, told her husband, in a lucid moment, what had happened. Jacques du Bois didn't hesitate for a minute and took her, accompanied by a large number of the townsfolk, to Grammont. Immediately after she had kissed the relics of the glorious martyr, Joan opens her eyes and shouted: "Praise and blessings be to God and St. Adrien, I am cured!" On the following day, October 18, St Leu's day, she recounted the event in the parish church of Wailly, in the presence of thirty witnesses. (Acta sanctorum, 8th Sept.)" The worship of St. Adrien has disappeared nowadays. "

== Sources ==
- BLANC Benoît, MAEYAERT Delphine, MORES Pascal, Patrimoine rural en Montreuillois, Cahiers du Musée de Berck, 2003.
- DE CALONNE Albéric, Histoire du canton de Montreuil, Res Universis, 1988.
- LEROY Albert, Les Vieilles Fermes du pays de Montreuil T1, Henry, 1972.
- RODIERE Roger, Le Pays de Montreuil, 1933.
- RODIERE Roger, Notice historique et archéologique du village de Wailly, archives départementales.
- Wailly-Beaucamp hier et aujourd'hui, 2003.
- Histoire d'églises, Service d'animation du patrimoine de Montreuil.
- Dictionnaire du Nord-Pas-de-Calais, Larousse, 2001.

== See also ==
- Communes of the Pas-de-Calais department
