= Canlers =

- Commune
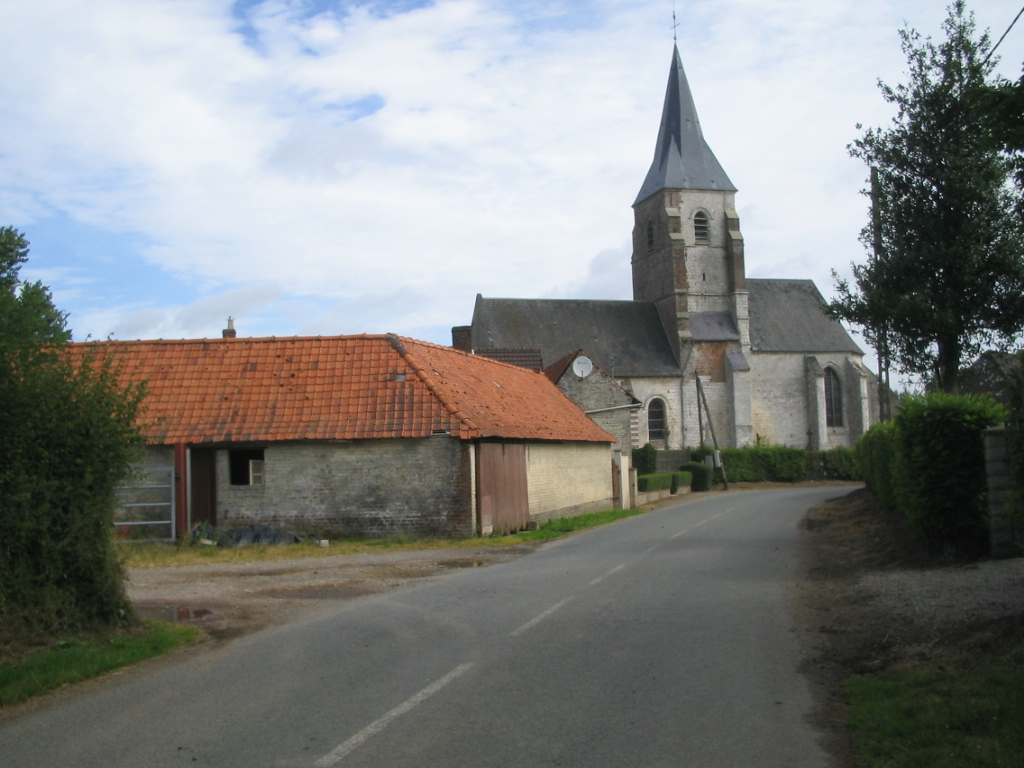
- The church of Canlers

- Coat of arms
- Location of Canlers
- Location within France Location within Hauts-de-France
- Coordinates: 50°28′59″N 2°08′48″E
- Country: France
- Region: Hauts-de-France
- Department: Pas-de-Calais
- Arrondissement: Montreuil
- Canton: Fruges
- Intercommunality: CC Haut Pays du Montreuillois

Government
  - Mayor (2020–2026): Laurent Fourriquet
- Area^{1}: 3.62 km^{2} (1.40 sq mi)
- Elevation: 140 m (460 ft)
- Highest elevation: 142 m (466 ft)
- Lowest elevation: 117 m (384 ft)
- Population (2023): 168
  - Density: 46.4/km^{2} (120/sq mi)
- Time zone: UTC+01:00 (CET)
  - Summer (DST): UTC+02:00 (CEST)
- INSEE/Postal code: 62209 /62310
- ^{1} French Land Register data, which excludes lakes, ponds, glaciers > 1 km^{2} (0.386 sq mi or 247 acres) and river estuaries.

Canlers is a commune in the Pas-de-Calais department in the Hauts-de-France region of France.

== Geography ==
A village situated some 17 miles (27 km) east of Montreuil-sur-Mer on the D154 road.

== Population ==
Historical population
Year	Pop.	±% p.a.
1968	173	—
1975	194	+1.65%
1982	178	−1.22%
1990	161	−1.25%
1999	175	+0.93%
2007	187	+0.83%
2012	176	−1.21%
2017	159	−2.01%
2023	168	+0.92%
Source: INSEE

== See also ==
- Communes of the Pas-de-Calais department
