= Senlis, Pas-de-Calais =

Senlis
- Commune
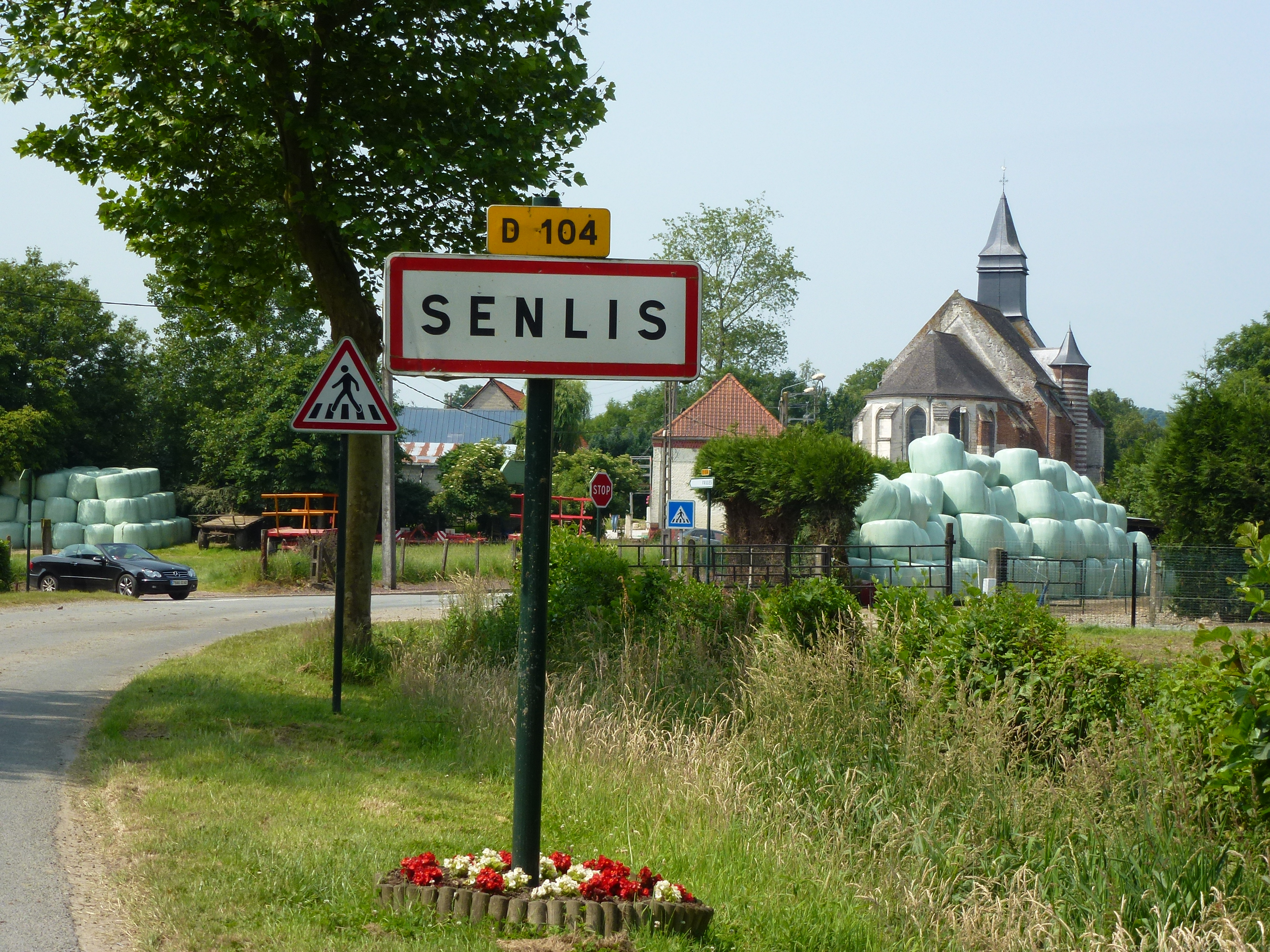
- The road into Senlis

- Coat of arms
- Location of Senlis
- Location within France Location within Hauts-de-France
- Coordinates: 50°32′04″N 2°09′05″E
- Country: France
- Region: Hauts-de-France
- Department: Pas-de-Calais
- Arrondissement: Montreuil
- Canton: Fruges
- Intercommunality: CC Haut Pays du Montreuillois

Government
  - Mayor (2020–2026): Frédéric Bailly
- Area^{1}: 4.9 km^{2} (1.9 sq mi)
- Elevation: 89 m (292 ft)
- Highest elevation: 167 m (548 ft)
- Lowest elevation: 77 m (253 ft)
- Population (2023): 159
  - Density: 32/km^{2} (84/sq mi)
- Time zone: UTC+01:00 (CET)
  - Summer (DST): UTC+02:00 (CEST)
- INSEE/Postal code: 62790 /62310
- ^{1} French Land Register data, which excludes lakes, ponds, glaciers > 1 km^{2} (0.386 sq mi or 247 acres) and river estuaries.

Senlis is a commune in the Pas-de-Calais department in the Hauts-de-France region of France 15 miles (24 km) east of Montreuil-sur-Mer.

== Population ==
Historical population
Year	Pop.	±% p.a.
1968	189	—
1975	205	+1.17%
1982	190	−1.08%
1990	176	−0.95%
1999	166	−0.65%
2007	190	+1.70%
2012	168	−2.43%
2017	163	−0.60%
2023	159	−0.41%
Source: INSEE

== See also ==
Communes of the Pas-de-Calais department
