= Arrondissement of Montreuil =

Coordinates: 50.47°N 1.77°E

Montreuil
- Arrondissement
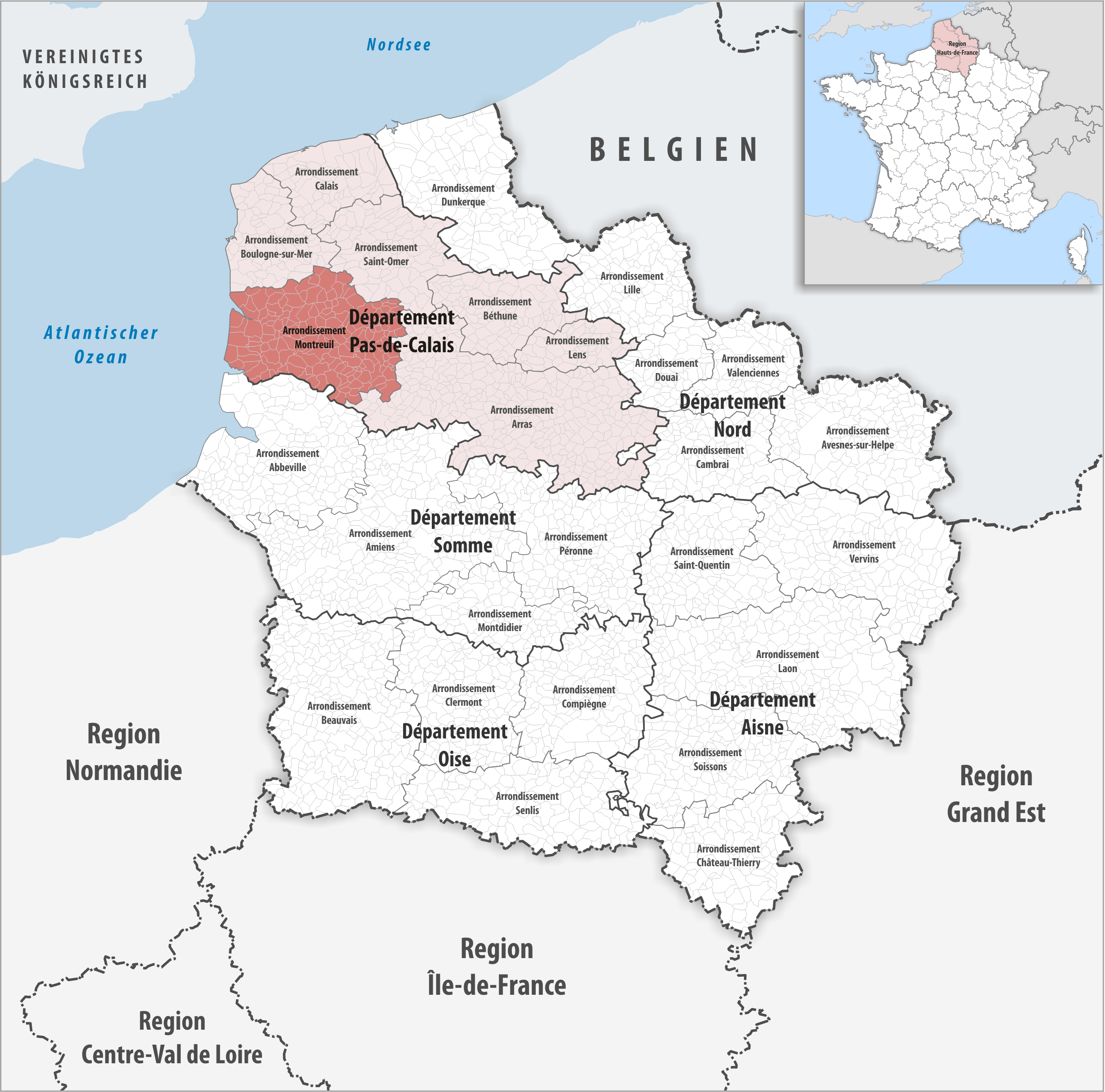
- Location within the region Hauts-de-France
- Country: France
- Region: Hauts-de-France
- Department: Pas-de-Calais
- No. of communes: {{{nbcomm}}}
- Area: 1,327.1 km^{2} (512.4 sq mi)
- Population (2023): 110,250
  - Density: 83.076/km^{2} (215.17/sq mi)
- INSEE code: 624

The arrondissement of Montreuil is an arrondissement of France in the Pas-de-Calais department in the Hauts-de-France region. It has 161 communes. Its population is 110,907 (2021), and its area is 1,327.1 km^{2} (512.4 sq mi).

== Composition ==
The communes of the arrondissement of Montreuil, and their INSEE codes, are:

1. Airon-Notre-Dame (62015)
2. Airon-Saint-Vaast (62016)
3. Aix-en-Ergny (62017)
4. Aix-en-Issart (62018)
5. Alette (62021)
6. Ambricourt (62026)
7. Attin (62044)
8. Aubin-Saint-Vaast (62046)
9. Auchy-lès-Hesdin(62050)
10. Avesnes (62062)
11. Avondance (62066)
12. Azincourt (62069)
13. Béalencourt(62090)
14. Beaumerie-Saint-Martin (62094)
15. Beaurainville (62100)
16. Bécourt (62102)
17. Berck (62108)
18. Bernieulles (62116)
19. Beussent (62123)
20. Beutin (62124)
21. Bezinghem (62127)
22. Bimont (62134)
23. Blangy-sur-Ternoise(62138)
24. Blingel(62142)
25. Boisjean (62150)
26. Boubers-lès-Hesmond (62157)
27. Bouin-Plumoison (62661)
28. Bourthes (62168)
29. Brévillers (62175)
30. Bréxent-Énocq (62176)
31. Brimeux (62177)
32. Buire-le-Sec (62183)
33. La Calotterie (62196)
34. Camiers (62201)
35. Campagne-lès-Boulonnais (62202)
36. Campagne-lès-Hesdin (62204)
37. Campigneulles-les-Grandes (62206)
38. Campigneulles-les-Petites (62207)
39. Canlers (62209)
40. Capelle-lès-Hesdin (62212)
41. Caumont (62219)
42. Cavron-Saint-Martin (62220)
43. Chériennes (62222)
44. Clenleu (62227)
45. Colline-Beaumont (62231)
46. Conchil-le-Temple (62233)
47. Contes (62236)
48. Cormont (62241)
49. Coupelle-Neuve (62246)
50. Coupelle-Vieille (62247)
51. Crépy (62256)
52. Créquy (62257)
53. Cucq (62261)
54. Douriez (62275)
55. Éclimeux(62282)
56. Écuires (62289)
57. Embry (62293)
58. Enquin-sur-Baillons (62296)
59. Ergny (62302)
60. Estrée (62312)
61. Estréelles (62315)
62. Étaples (62318)
63. Fillièvres (62335)
64. Frencq (62354)
65. Fresnoy(62357)
66. Fressin (62359)
67. Fruges (62364)
68. Galametz(62365)
69. Gouy-Saint-André (62382)
70. Grigny(62388)
71. Groffliers (62390)
72. Guigny (62395)
73. Guisy (62398)
74. Herly (62437)
75. Hesdin-la-Forêt (62447)
76. Hesmond (62449)
77. Hézecques (62453)
78. Hubersent (62460)
79. Hucqueliers (62463)
80. Humbert (62466)
81. Incourt(62470)
82. Inxent (62472)
83. Labroye (62481)
84. Lebiez (62492)
85. Lefaux (62496)
86. Lépine (62499)
87. Lespinoy (62501)
88. La Loge (62521)
89. Loison-sur-Créquoise (62522)
90. Longvilliers (62527)
91. Lugy (62533)
92. La Madelaine-sous-Montreuil (62535)
93. Maintenay (62538)
94. Maisoncelle(62541)
95. Maninghem (62545)
96. Marant (62547)
97. Marconnelle (62550)
98. Marenla (62551)
99. Maresquel-Ecquemicourt (62552)
100. Maresville (62554)
101. Marles-sur-Canche (62556)
102. Matringhem (62562)
103. Mencas (62565)
104. Merlimont (62571)
105. Montcavrel (62585)
106. Montreuil (62588)
107. Mouriez (62596)
108. Nempont-Saint-Firmin (62602)
109. Neulette(62605)
110. Neuville-sous-Montreuil (62610)
111. Noyelles-lès-Humières (62625)
112. Offin (62635)
113. Le Parcq (62647)
114. Parenty (62648)
115. Planques (62659)
116. Preures (62670)
117. Le Quesnoy-en-Artois (62677)
118. Quilen (62682)
119. Radinghem (62685)
120. Rang-du-Fliers (62688)
121. Raye-sur-Authie (62690)
122. Recques-sur-Course (62698)
123. Regnauville (62700)
124. Rimboval (62710)
125. Rollancourt(62719)
126. Roussent (62723)
127. Royon (62725)
128. Ruisseauville (62726)
129. Rumilly (62729)
130. Sains-lès-Fressin (62738)
131. Saint-Aubin (62742)
132. Saint-Denœux (62745)
133. Saint-Georges (62749)
134. Saint-Josse (62752)
135. Saint-Michel-sous-Bois (62762)
136. Saint-Rémy-au-Bois (62768)
137. Saulchoy (62783)
138. Sempy (62787)
139. Senlis (62790)
140. Sorrus (62799)
141. Tigny-Noyelle (62815)
142. Torcy (62823)
143. Tortefontaine (62824)
144. Le Touquet-Paris-Plage (62826)
145. Tramecourt (62828)
146. Tubersent (62832)
147. Vacqueriette-Erquières (62834)
148. Verchin (62843)
149. Verchocq (62844)
150. Verton (62849)
151. Vieil-Hesdin (62850)
152. Vincly (62862)
153. Waben (62866)
154. Wail (62868)
155. Wailly-Beaucamp (62870)
156. Wambercourt (62871)
157. Wamin (62872)
158. Wicquinghem (62886)
159. Widehem (62887)
160. Willeman(62890)
161. Zoteux (62903)

== History ==
The arrondissement of Montreuil was created in 1800. In January 2007 it absorbed the canton of Le Parcq from the arrondissement of Arras.

As a result of the reorganisation of the cantons of France which came into effect in 2015, the borders of the cantons are no longer related to the borders of the arrondissements. The cantons of the arrondissement of Montreuil were, as of January 2015:

1. Berck
2. Campagne-lès-Hesdin
3. Étaples
4. Fruges
5. Hesdin
6. Hucqueliers
7. Montreuil
8. Le Parcq
