= Neulette =

- Commune
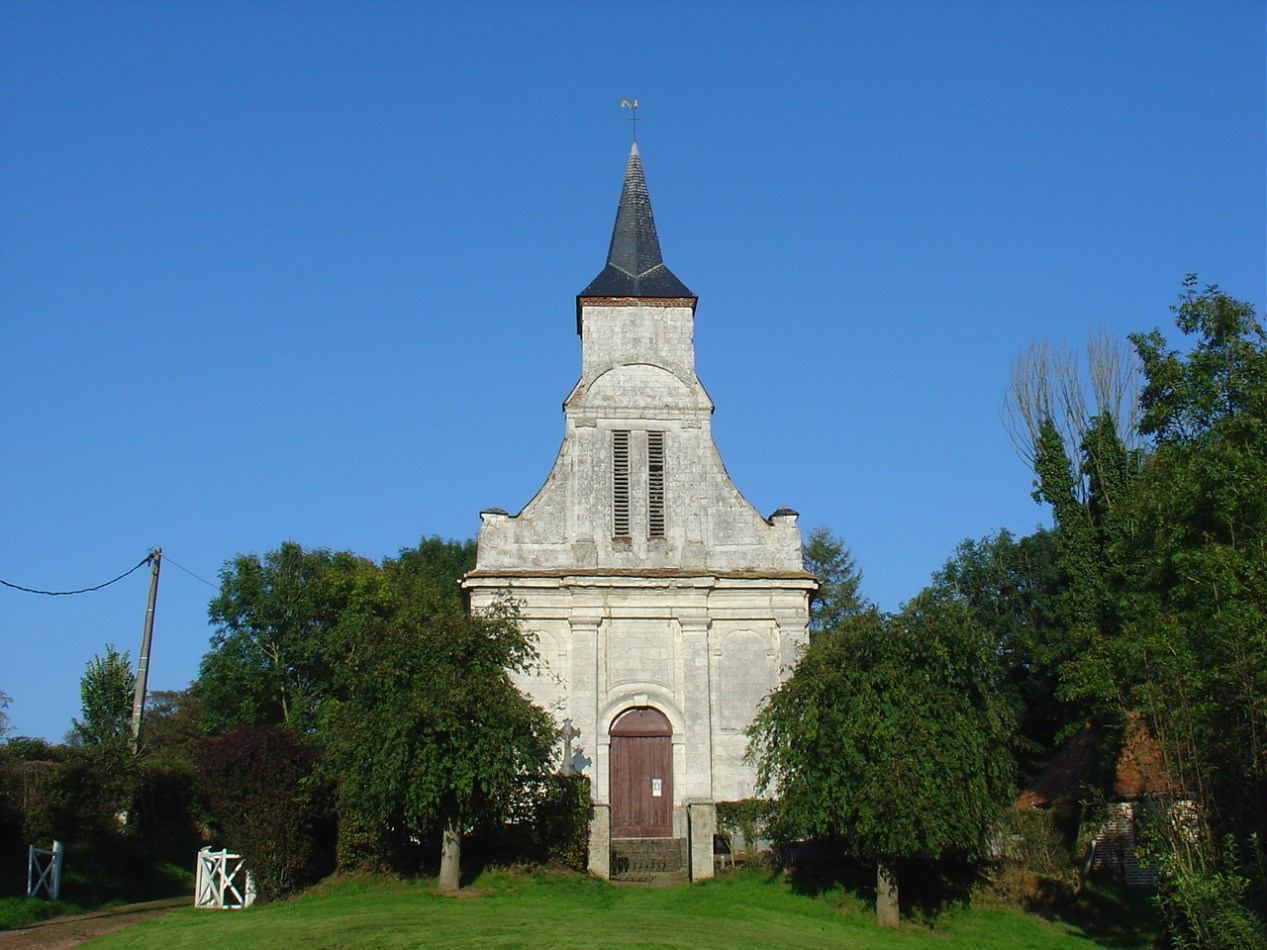
- The church of Neulette

- Coat of arms
- Location of Neulette
- Location within France Location within Hauts-de-France
- Coordinates: 50°22′57″N 2°10′02″E
- Country: France
- Region: Hauts-de-France
- Department: Pas-de-Calais
- Arrondissement: Montreuil
- Canton: Auxi-le-Château
- Intercommunality: CC des 7 Vallées

Government
  - Mayor (2020–2026): Caroline Cussac
- Area^{1}: 1.36 km^{2} (0.53 sq mi)
- Elevation: 128 m (420 ft)
- Highest elevation: 113 m (371 ft)
- Lowest elevation: 68 m (223 ft)
- Population (2023): 22
  - Density: 16/km^{2} (42/sq mi)
- Time zone: UTC+01:00 (CET)
  - Summer (DST): UTC+02:00 (CEST)
- INSEE/Postal code: 62605 /62770
- ^{1} French Land Register data, which excludes lakes, ponds, glaciers > 1 km^{2} (0.386 sq mi or 247 acres) and river estuaries.

Neulette (French pronunciation: [nølɛt]) is a commune in the Pas-de-Calais department of northern France. The inhabitants are called Neulettois.

== See also ==
- Communes of the Pas-de-Calais department
