= Embry, Pas-de-Calais =

Embry
- Commune
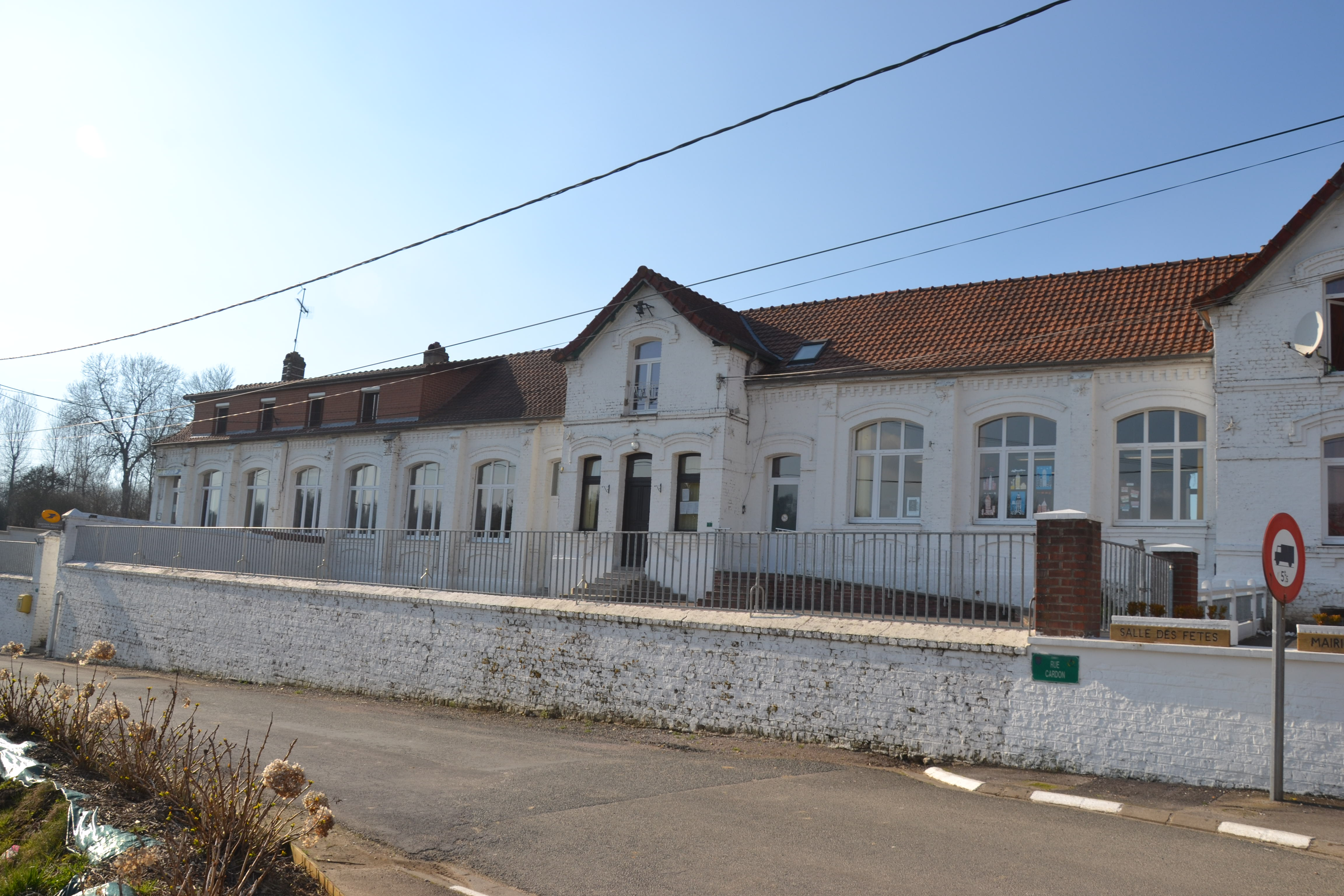
- The town hall and school of Embry

- Coat of arms
- Location of Embry
- Location within France Location within Hauts-de-France
- Coordinates: 50°29′37″N 1°58′05″E
- Country: France
- Region: Hauts-de-France
- Department: Pas-de-Calais
- Arrondissement: Montreuil
- Canton: Fruges
- Intercommunality: CC Haut Pays du Montreuillois

Government
  - Mayor (2020–2026): Bruno Boulogne
- Area^{1}: 11.69 km^{2} (4.51 sq mi)
- Elevation: 68 m (223 ft)
- Highest elevation: 177 m (581 ft)
- Lowest elevation: 55 m (180 ft)
- Population (2023): 241
  - Density: 20.6/km^{2} (53.4/sq mi)
- Time zone: UTC+01:00 (CET)
  - Summer (DST): UTC+02:00 (CEST)
- INSEE/Postal code: 62293 /62990
- ^{1} French Land Register data, which excludes lakes, ponds, glaciers > 1 km^{2} (0.386 sq mi or 247 acres) and river estuaries.

Embry (French pronunciation: [ɑ̃bʁi]; Dutch: Embreke) is a commune in the Pas-de-Calais department in the Hauts-de-France region of France.

== Geography ==
A village situated some 10 miles (16 km) east of Montreuil-sur-Mer at the D149 and D108 crossroads.

== Population ==
Historical population
Year	Pop.	±% p.a.
1968	316	—
1975	288	−1.32%
1982	251	−1.95%
1990	226	−1.30%
1999	203	−1.19%
2007	227	+1.41%
2012	253	+2.19%
2017	239	−1.13%
2023	241	+0.14%
Source: INSEE

Some houses in the village are second homes, owned by British or Dutch families attracted by inexpensive property. The result has been to bring money into the area and old houses have been preserved by renovation.

== Places of interest ==
- Vestiges of an ancient château.
- The Maison Sainte Marguerite, dated 1630.
- The fifteenth century church of Saint Martin

Since 2007 a local society for the preservation of the Church (APSE) has been active in fund raising and in generally overseeing the Church's part in the village heritage.

== See also ==
- Communes of the Pas-de-Calais department
