= Saint-Aubin, Pas-de-Calais =

Saint-Aubin
- Commune
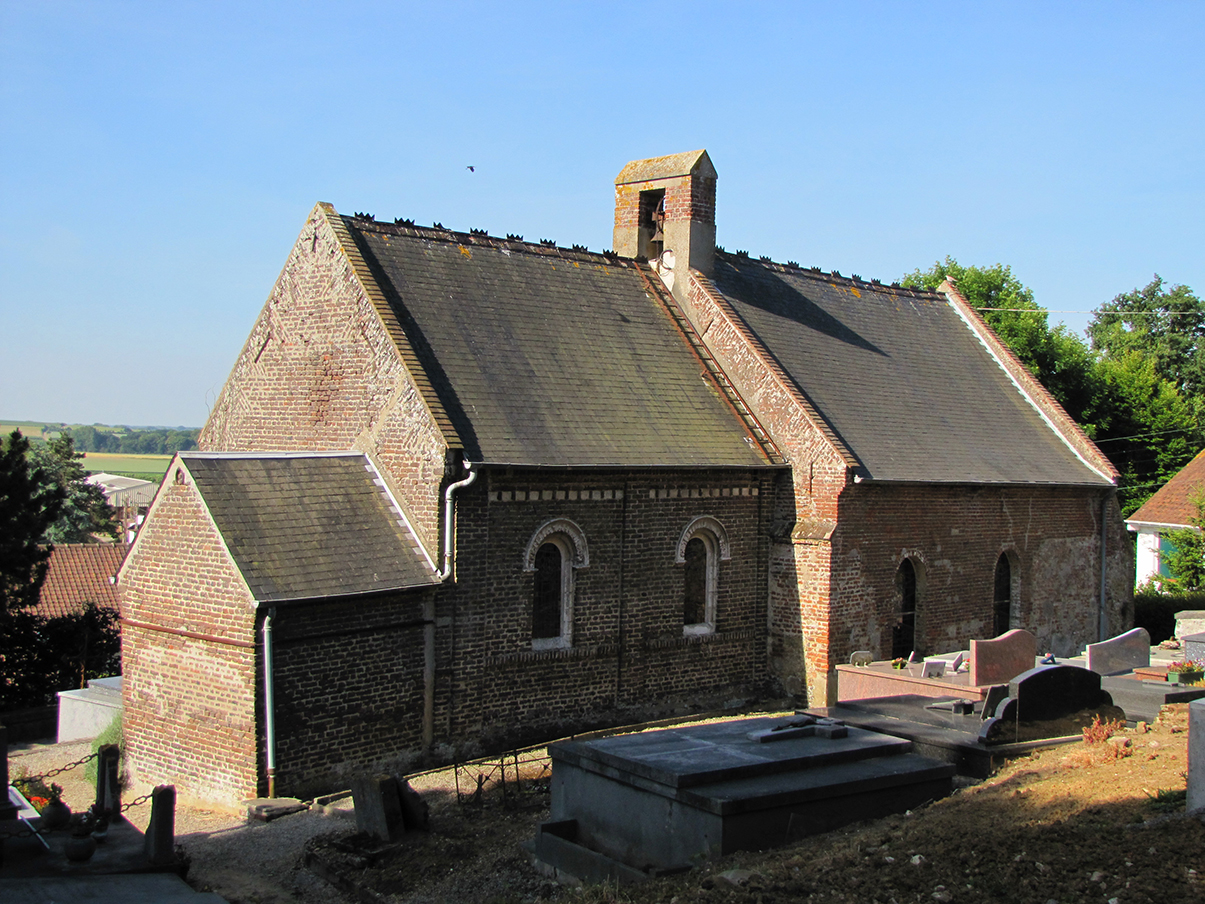
- The church of Saint-Aubin

- Coat of arms
- Location of Saint-Aubin
- Location within France Location within Hauts-de-France
- Coordinates: 50°27′27″N 1°40′00″E
- Country: France
- Region: Hauts-de-France
- Department: Pas-de-Calais
- Arrondissement: Montreuil
- Canton: Étaples
- Intercommunality: CA Deux Baies en Montreuillois

Government
  - Mayor (2020–2026): Daniel Thilliez
- Area^{1}: 4.54 km^{2} (1.75 sq mi)
- Elevation: 18 m (59 ft)
- Highest elevation: 61 m (200 ft)
- Lowest elevation: 3 m (9.8 ft)
- Population (2023): 289
  - Density: 63.7/km^{2} (165/sq mi)
- Time zone: UTC+01:00 (CET)
  - Summer (DST): UTC+02:00 (CEST)
- INSEE/Postal code: 62742 /62170
- ^{1} French Land Register data, which excludes lakes, ponds, glaciers > 1 km^{2} (0.386 sq mi or 247 acres) and river estuaries.

Saint-Aubin (French pronunciation: [sɛ̃.t‿obɛ̃]) is a commune in the Pas-de-Calais department in the Hauts-de-France region of France. It won silver prize in the Entente Florale in 2000.

== Geography ==
Saint-Aubin is located 5 miles (8 km) west of Montreuil-sur-Mer on the D144E1 road.

== Population ==
Historical population
Year	Pop.	±% p.a.
1968	123	—
1975	124	+0.12%
1982	191	+6.37%
1990	197	+0.39%
1999	217	+1.08%
2007	241	+1.32%
2012	267	+2.07%
2017	264	−0.23%
2023	289	+1.52%
Source: INSEE

== Places of interest ==
- The church of St. Aubin, dating from the seventeenth century
- An eighteenth-century dovecote

== See also ==
- Communes of the Pas-de-Calais department
