= Widehem =

- Commune
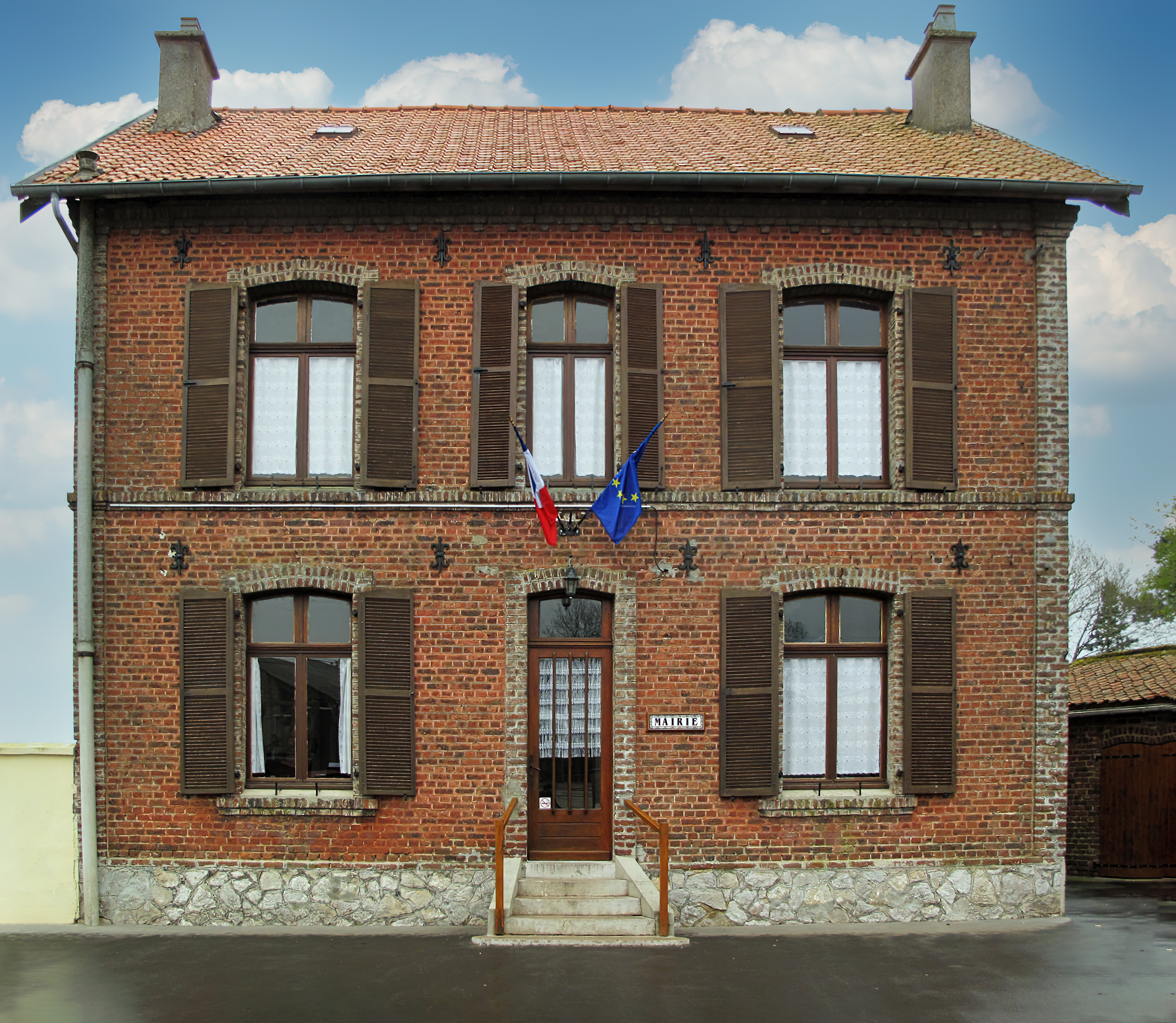
- The town hall of Widehem
- Location of Widehem
- Location within France Location within Hauts-de-France
- Coordinates: 50°35′11″N 1°40′23″E
- Country: France
- Region: Hauts-de-France
- Department: Pas-de-Calais
- Arrondissement: Montreuil
- Canton: Étaples
- Intercommunality: Deux Baies en Montreuillois

Government
  - Mayor (2020–2026): Pierre Lequien
- Area^{1}: 7.2 km^{2} (2.8 sq mi)
- Elevation: 99 m (325 ft)
- Highest elevation: 178 m (584 ft)
- Lowest elevation: 64 m (210 ft)
- Population (2023): 244
  - Density: 34/km^{2} (88/sq mi)
- Time zone: UTC+01:00 (CET)
  - Summer (DST): UTC+02:00 (CEST)
- INSEE/Postal code: 62887 /62630
- ^{1} French Land Register data, which excludes lakes, ponds, glaciers > 1 km^{2} (0.386 sq mi or 247 acres) and river estuaries.

Widehem (West Flemish: Widem) is a commune in the Pas-de-Calais department in the Hauts-de-France region of France 19 km (12 mi) north of Montreuil-sur-Mer, 5 km (3 mi) from the coast.

== Population ==
Historical population
Year	Pop.	±% p.a.
1968	232	—
1975	195	−2.45%
1982	175	−1.53%
1990	229	+3.42%
1999	249	+0.93%
2007	259	+0.49%
2012	261	+0.15%
2017	244	−1.34%
2023	244	+0.00%
Source: INSEE

== See also ==
- Communes of the Pas-de-Calais department
