= Merlimont =

- Commune
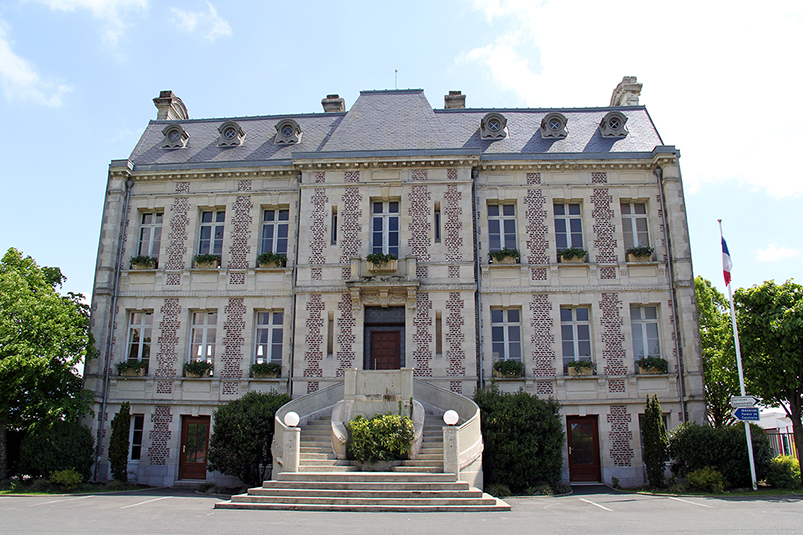
- The town hall of Merlimont

- Coat of arms
- Location of Merlimont
- Location within France Location within Hauts-de-France
- Coordinates: 50°27′23″N 1°36′54″E
- Country: France
- Region: Hauts-de-France
- Department: Pas-de-Calais
- Arrondissement: Montreuil
- Canton: Étaples
- Intercommunality: CA Deux Baies en Montreuillois

Government
  - Mayor (2026–32): Mary Bonvoisin
- Area^{1}: 21.49 km^{2} (8.30 sq mi)
- Elevation: 7 m (23 ft)
- Highest elevation: 41 m (135 ft)
- Lowest elevation: 0 m (0 ft)
- Population (2023): 3,342
  - Density: 155.5/km^{2} (402.8/sq mi)
- Time zone: UTC+01:00 (CET)
  - Summer (DST): UTC+02:00 (CEST)
- INSEE/Postal code: 62571 /62155
- ^{1} French Land Register data, which excludes lakes, ponds, glaciers > 1 km^{2} (0.386 sq mi or 247 acres) and river estuaries.

Merlimont (French pronunciation: [mɛʁlimɔ̃]) is a commune in the Pas-de-Calais department in the Hauts-de-France region of France. facing north to the English Channel.

== Population ==
Historical population
Year	Pop.	±% p.a.
1968	1,310	—
1975	1,619	+3.07%
1982	1,832	+1.78%
1990	2,212	+2.38%
1999	2,606	+1.84%
2007	3,027	+1.89%
2012	3,150	+0.80%
2017	3,348	+1.23%
2023	3,342	−0.03%
Source: INSEE

== Sights ==
=== Notable buildings ===
- The town hall.
- Saint Nicholas Church, on Rue Auguste-Biblocq.
- The war memorial, created by the sculptor Jules Déchin and renovated in 2022. Located on either side of the monument are two cannons from a Mark IV tank, donated by the British Army at the end of the First World War. A tank driver training school was based in Merlimont.

== See also ==
- Communes of the Pas-de-Calais department
