= Tortefontaine =

- Commune
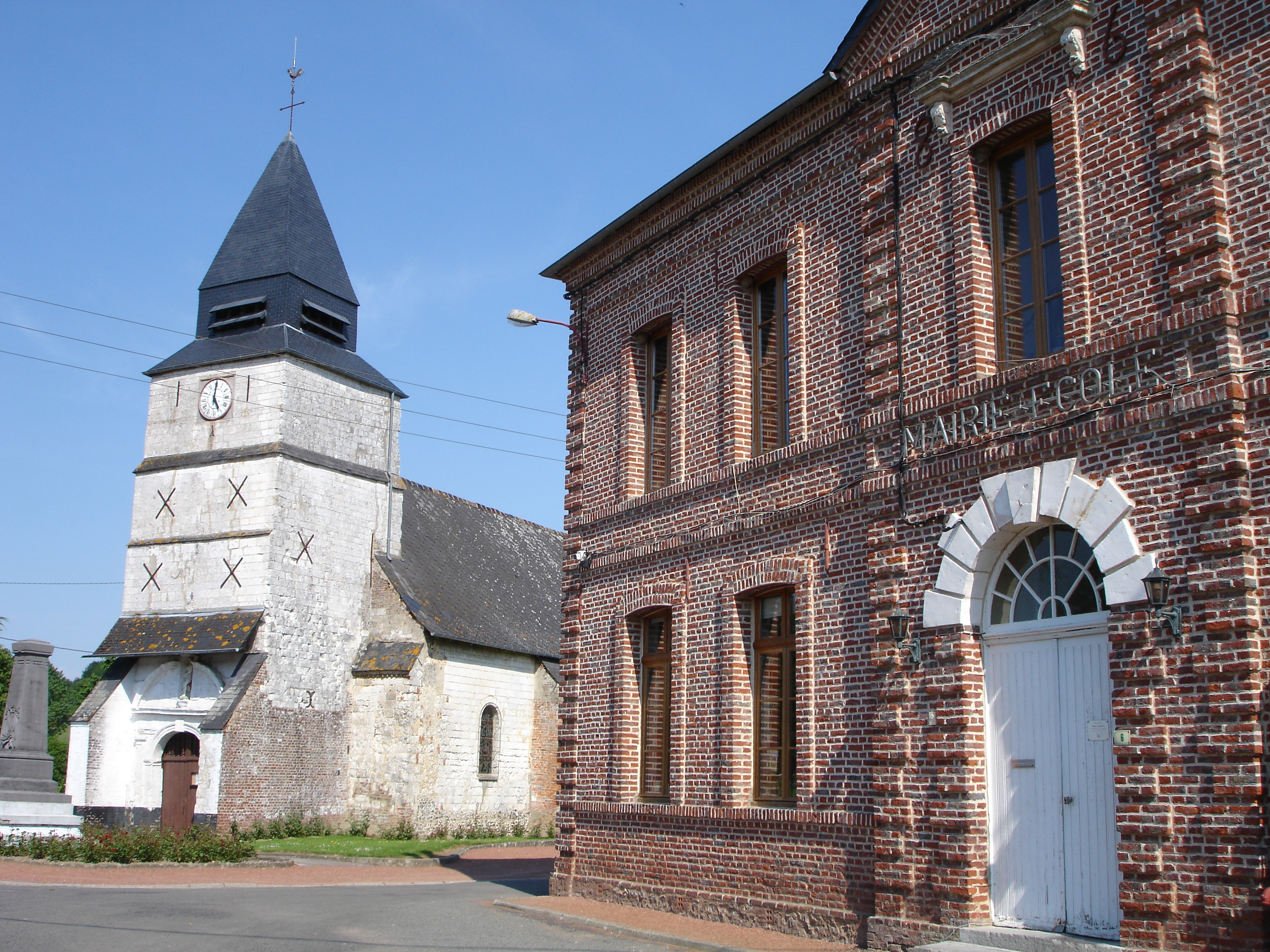
- The school, town hall and church of Tortefontaine

- Coat of arms
- Location of Tortefontaine
- Location within France Location within Hauts-de-France
- Coordinates: 50°19′22″N 1°55′17″E
- Country: France
- Region: Hauts-de-France
- Department: Pas-de-Calais
- Arrondissement: Montreuil
- Canton: Auxi-le-Château
- Intercommunality: CC des 7 Vallées

Government
  - Mayor (2020–2026): Francis Tetu
- Area^{1}: 11.81 km^{2} (4.56 sq mi)
- Elevation: 26 m (85 ft)
- Highest elevation: 98 m (322 ft)
- Lowest elevation: 11 m (36 ft)
- Population (2023): 233
  - Density: 19.7/km^{2} (51.1/sq mi)
- Time zone: UTC+01:00 (CET)
  - Summer (DST): UTC+02:00 (CEST)
- INSEE/Postal code: 62824 /62140
- ^{1} French Land Register data, which excludes lakes, ponds, glaciers > 1 km^{2} (0.386 sq mi or 247 acres) and river estuaries.

Tortefontaine (French pronunciation: [tɔʁtəfɔ̃tɛn]) is a commune in the Pas-de-Calais department in the Hauts-de-France region of France. The commune is part of the 7 Vallées community of communes, which includes 69 municipalities and had 29,602 inhabitants in 2019.

== Geography ==
Tortefontaine lies southwest of Hesdin, on the D136 road with the Varnette, a small tributary of the Authie flowing through it. The rural agricultural commune has three hamlets, Le Molinel, Le Bout de Bas and Saint-Josse-au-Bois.

== Hydrography ==
The territory of the commune is located in the Artois-Picardy basin.

The commune is crossed by the Authie, a natural watercourse of 108.18 km, which has its source in the commune of Coigneux, located in the department of the Somme, and which flows into the English Channel between the communes of Berck and Fort-Mahon-Plage.

== Etymology ==
The name comes from tortus "crooked" and fontana "fountain". The name is explained by the meanders of the course of the Authie which crosses the commune, a natural watercourse of 108.18 km, which has its source in the commune of Coigneux at a place called the "Fontaine du Rossignol", located in the department of the Somme, and which flows into the English Channel.

The name of the locality is attested in the forms Torta fontena (late eleventh century); Tortus fons (1125); Torta fontana (1137); Tortefontaine (1181); Tortefontene (1288); Tertefontaine (1384); Tortifontaines (1484); Torfontaines (1638); Torte-Fontaines (1720); Tortfontaine (1790).

== Population ==
The inhabitants are called Tortefontainois in French.

Historical population
Year	Pop.	±% p.a.
1968	285	—
1975	225	−3.32%
1982	258	+1.97%
1990	216	−2.20%
1999	231	+0.75%
2007	231	+0.00%
2012	259	+2.31%
2017	222	−3.04%
2023	233	+0.81%
Source: INSEE

== Places and monuments ==
- The ruins of the abbey of Dommartin. First built in 1161, the ruins are found in farmland.
- 17th / 18th century buildings and more ruins of the same.

== Landscape ==
The commune is part of the western part of the "Val d'Authie landscape" as defined in the Atlas of the Landscapes of the Nord-Pas-de-Calais region, designed by the Regional Directorate for the Environment, Planning and Housing (DREAL).

This landscape, which concerns 83 communes, is bounded: to the south, in the department of the Somme, by the "landscape of Authie and Ponthieu, depending on the atlas of the landscapes of Picardy, and to the north and east by the landscapes of Montreuillois, Ternois and the landscapes of the Cambrian and Artesian plateaus. The border character of the Authie valley, today between the Pas-de-Calais and the Somme, dates back to the Middle Ages when it separated the kingdom of France from the Spanish Netherlands, to the north.

Its northern slope is steep and steep, while the southern slope offers gentler slopes. To the west, the river opens onto the Bay of Authie, typical of the Picardy estuary, and flows into the English Channel. With its vast estuary and the landscapes of the lowlands, the bay of Authie contrasts with the greener landscapes upstream.

The Authie, a deep cut in the artesian plateau, has created pronounced eco-landscape entities with a limestone plateau whose altitude varies from 100 to 163 m that extends on each side of the river. The altitude of the plateau declines from the Doullens region in the east (highest point at 163 m) to the Picardy lowlands in the west (less than 40 m). The bottom of the Authie valley, on the other hand, is covered with alluvium and peat. The Authie is a coastal river classified as a first-class watercourse where the dominant fish population is made up of salmonids. The land cover of the landscapes of the Authie Valley is made up of 70% under cultivation.

== See also ==
- Communes of the Pas-de-Calais department
