= Frencq =

Frencq Frenk
- Commune
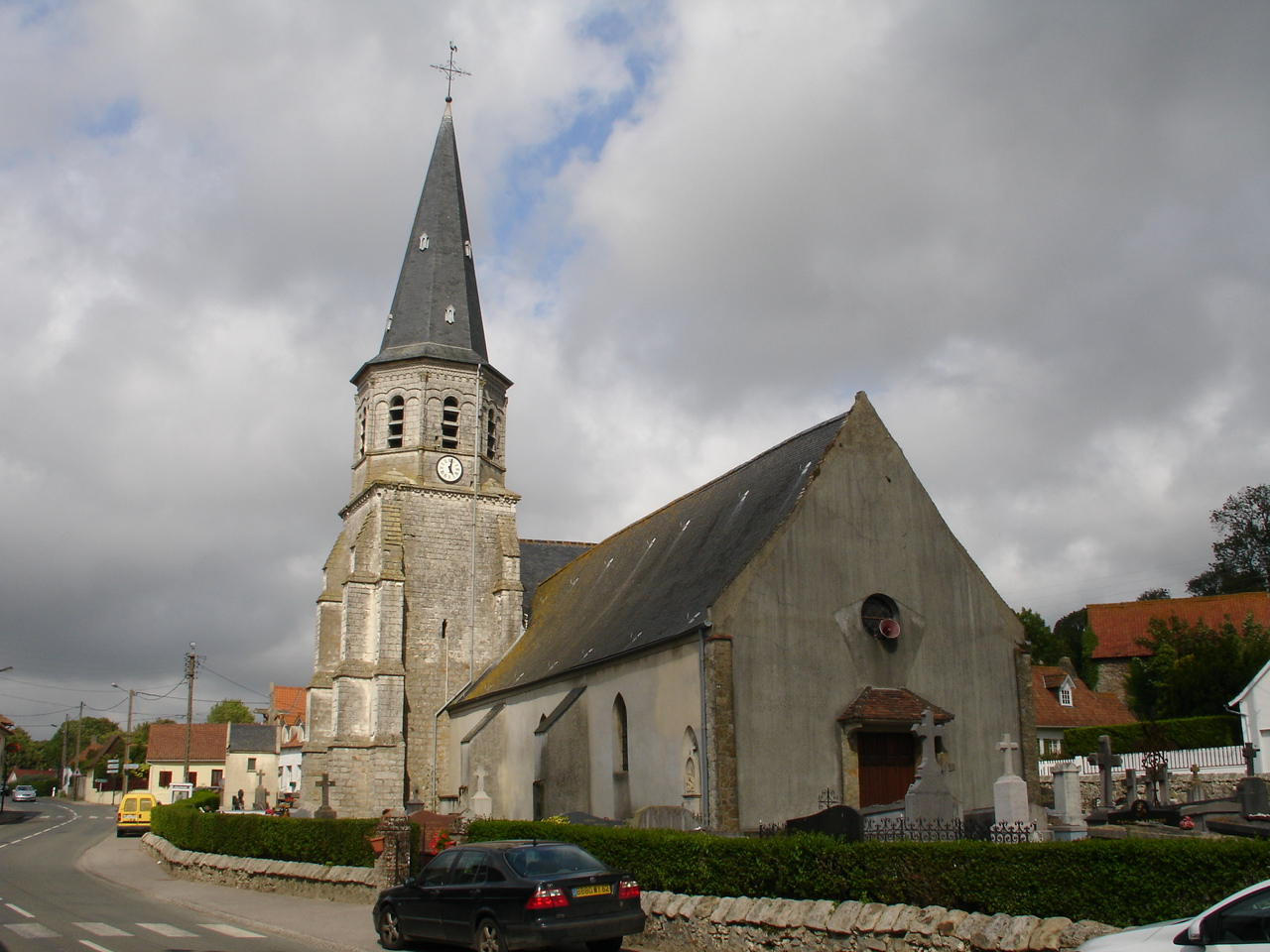
- The church of Frencq

- Coat of arms
- Location of Frencq
- Location within France Location within Hauts-de-France
- Coordinates: 50°33′40″N 1°41′57″E
- Country: France
- Region: Hauts-de-France
- Department: Pas-de-Calais
- Arrondissement: Montreuil
- Canton: Étaples
- Intercommunality: CA Deux Baies en Montreuillois

Government
  - Mayor (2020–2026): Norbert Magnier
- Area^{1}: 19.81 km^{2} (7.65 sq mi)
- Elevation: 33 m (108 ft)
- Highest elevation: 150 m (490 ft)
- Lowest elevation: 18 m (59 ft)
- Population (2023): 893
  - Density: 45.1/km^{2} (117/sq mi)
- Time zone: UTC+01:00 (CET)
  - Summer (DST): UTC+02:00 (CEST)
- INSEE/Postal code: 62354 /62630
- ^{1} French Land Register data, which excludes lakes, ponds, glaciers > 1 km^{2} (0.386 sq mi or 247 acres) and river estuaries.

Frencq (French pronunciation: [fʁɑ̃k]; West Flemish: Frenk) is a commune in the Pas-de-Calais department in the Hauts-de-France region of France about 10 miles (16 km) north of Montreuil-sur-Mer.

== Population ==
Historical population
Year	Pop.	±% p.a.
1968	808	—
1975	749	−1.08%
1982	730	−0.37%
1990	742	+0.20%
1999	705	−0.57%
2007	765	+1.03%
2012	794	+0.75%
2017	843	+1.20%
2023	893	+0.96%
Source: INSEE

== See also ==
- Communes of the Pas-de-Calais department
