= Tubersent =

- Commune
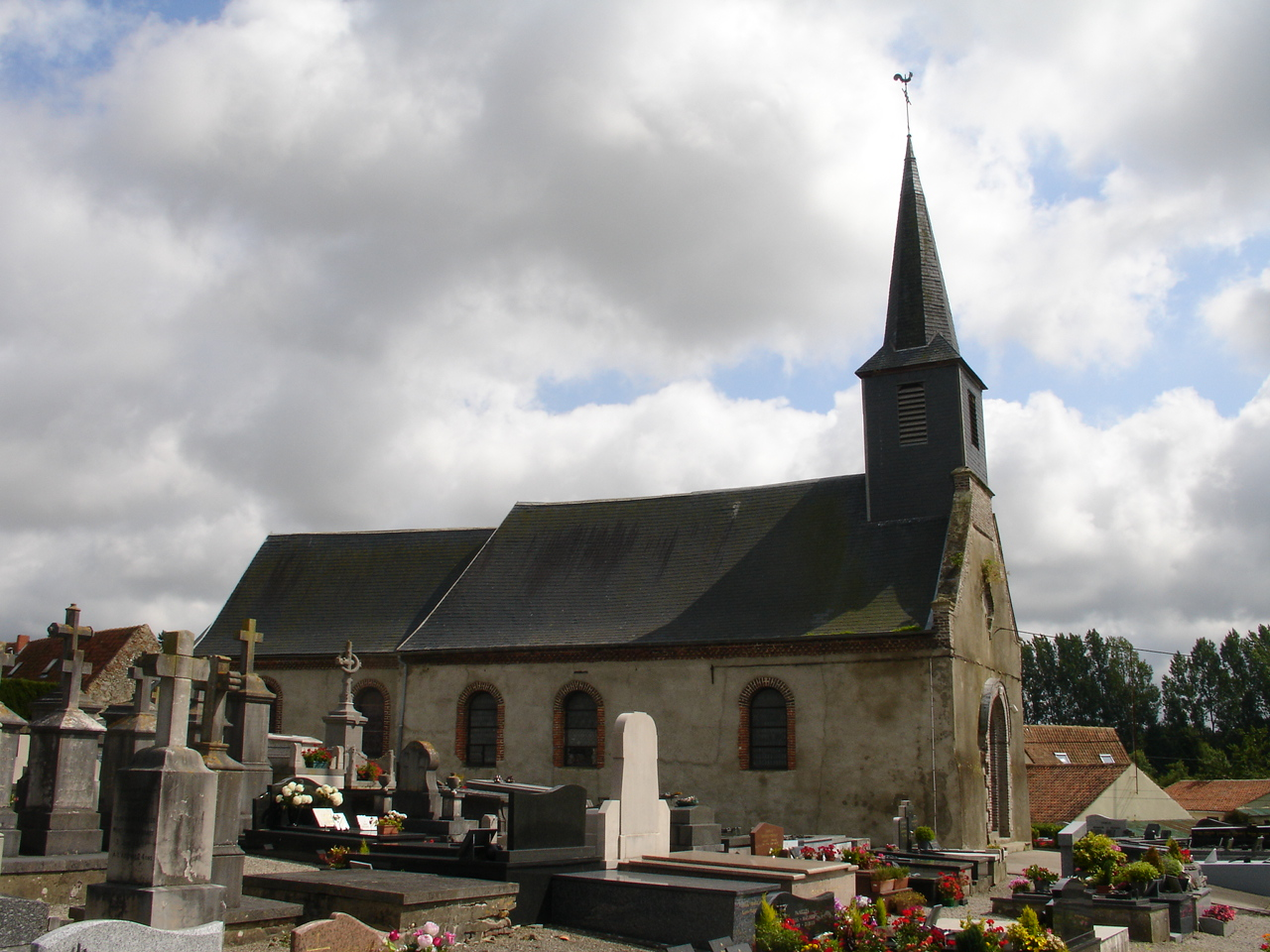
- The church of Tubersent
- Location of Tubersent
- Location within France Location within Hauts-de-France
- Coordinates: 50°31′14″N 1°42′19″E
- Country: France
- Region: Hauts-de-France
- Department: Pas-de-Calais
- Arrondissement: Montreuil
- Canton: Étaples
- Intercommunality: CA Deux Baies en Montreuillois

Government
  - Mayor (2020–2026): Hubert Degreve
- Area^{1}: 6.9 km^{2} (2.7 sq mi)
- Elevation: 14 m (46 ft)
- Highest elevation: 105 m (344 ft)
- Lowest elevation: 2 m (6.6 ft)
- Population (2023): 578
  - Density: 84/km^{2} (220/sq mi)
- Time zone: UTC+01:00 (CET)
  - Summer (DST): UTC+02:00 (CEST)
- INSEE/Postal code: 62832 /62630
- ^{1} French Land Register data, which excludes lakes, ponds, glaciers > 1 km^{2} (0.386 sq mi or 247 acres) and river estuaries.

Tubersent (French pronunciation: [tybɛʁsɑ̃]) is a commune in the Pas-de-Calais department in the Hauts-de-France region of France 5 miles (8 km) northeast of Montreuil-sur-Mer.

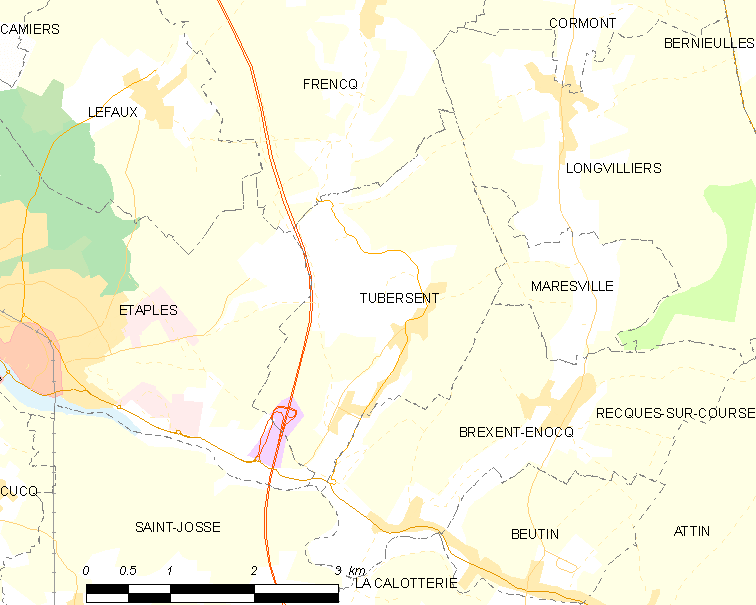
Map of the commune and adjacent places

== Population ==
Historical population
Year	Pop.	±% p.a.
1968	318	—
1975	287	−1.45%
1982	351	+2.92%
1990	448	+3.10%
1999	472	+0.58%
2007	528	+1.41%
2012	495	−1.28%
2017	538	+1.68%
2023	578	+1.20%
Source: INSEE

== See also ==
- Communes of the Pas-de-Calais department
