= Lefaux =

- Commune
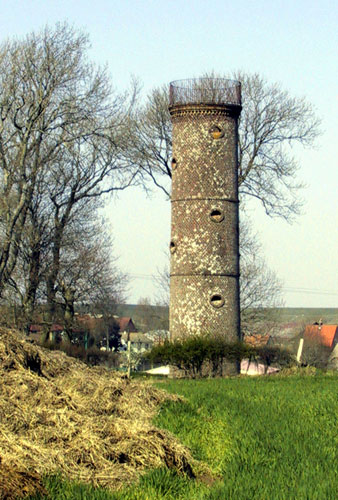
- Semaphore tower

- Coat of arms
- Location of Lefaux
- Location within France Location within Hauts-de-France
- Coordinates: 50°32′37″N 1°39′38″E
- Country: France
- Region: Hauts-de-France
- Department: Pas-de-Calais
- Arrondissement: Montreuil
- Canton: Étaples
- Intercommunality: CA Deux Baies en Montreuillois

Government
  - Mayor (2020–2026): Geneviève Margueritte
- Area^{1}: 8.25 km^{2} (3.19 sq mi)
- Elevation: 75 m (246 ft)
- Highest elevation: 152 m (499 ft)
- Lowest elevation: 23 m (75 ft)
- Population (2023): 229
  - Density: 27.8/km^{2} (71.9/sq mi)
- Time zone: UTC+01:00 (CET)
  - Summer (DST): UTC+02:00 (CEST)
- INSEE/Postal code: 62496 /62630
- ^{1} French Land Register data, which excludes lakes, ponds, glaciers > 1 km^{2} (0.386 sq mi or 247 acres) and river estuaries.

Lefaux (French pronunciation: [ləfo]) is a commune in the Pas-de-Calais department in the Hauts-de-France region of France 8 miles (16 km) north of Montreuil-sur-Mer.

== Population ==
Historical population
Year	Pop.	±% p.a.
1968	199	—
1975	198	−0.07%
1982	203	+0.36%
1990	204	+0.06%
1999	242	+1.92%
2007	274	+1.56%
2012	255	−1.43%
2017	238	−1.37%
2023	229	−0.64%
Source: INSEE

== Place of interest ==
- The semaphore tower at Lefaux, a remnant of the system created by Claude Chappe in 1793.

== See also ==
- Communes of the Pas-de-Calais department
