= Bréxent-Énocq =

Bréxent-Énocq Brekelesent-Anoch
- Commune
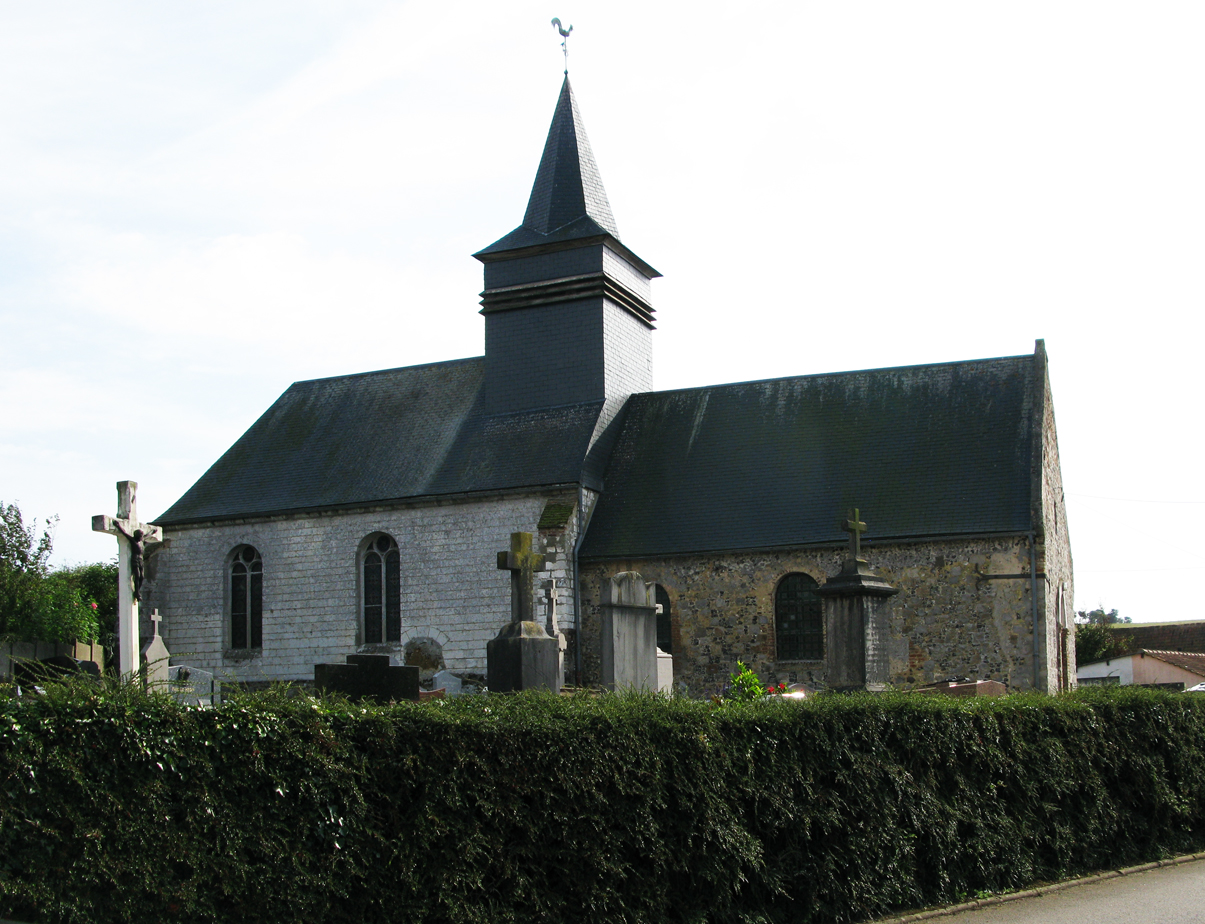
- The church of Bréxent-Énocq

- Coat of arms
- Location of Bréxent-Énocq
- Location within France Location within Hauts-de-France
- Coordinates: 50°30′39″N 1°43′50″E
- Country: France
- Region: Hauts-de-France
- Department: Pas-de-Calais
- Arrondissement: Montreuil
- Canton: Étaples
- Intercommunality: CA Deux Baies en Montreuillois

Government
  - Mayor (2020–2026): Michel Hedin
- Area^{1}: 7.27 km^{2} (2.81 sq mi)
- Elevation: 8 m (26 ft)
- Highest elevation: 91 m (299 ft)
- Lowest elevation: 3 m (9.8 ft)
- Population (2023): 634
  - Density: 87.2/km^{2} (226/sq mi)
- Time zone: UTC+01:00 (CET)
  - Summer (DST): UTC+02:00 (CEST)
- INSEE/Postal code: 62176 /62170
- ^{1} French Land Register data, which excludes lakes, ponds, glaciers > 1 km^{2} (0.386 sq mi or 247 acres) and river estuaries.

Bréxent-Énocq (French pronunciation: [bʁeksɑ̃ enɔk]; West Flemish: Brekelesent-Anoch) is a commune in the Pas-de-Calais department in the Hauts-de-France region in northern France.

== Geography ==
A village situated some 5 miles (8 km) northeast of Montreuil-sur-Mer on the D146 road.

== Population ==
Historical population
Year	Pop.	±% p.a.
1968	347	—
1975	340	−0.29%
1982	419	+3.03%
1990	554	+3.55%
1999	577	+0.45%
2007	619	+0.88%
2012	685	+2.05%
2017	681	−0.12%
2023	634	−1.18%
Source: INSEE

== See also ==
- Communes of the Pas-de-Calais department
