= Maresville =

Maresville Mariadorp
- Commune
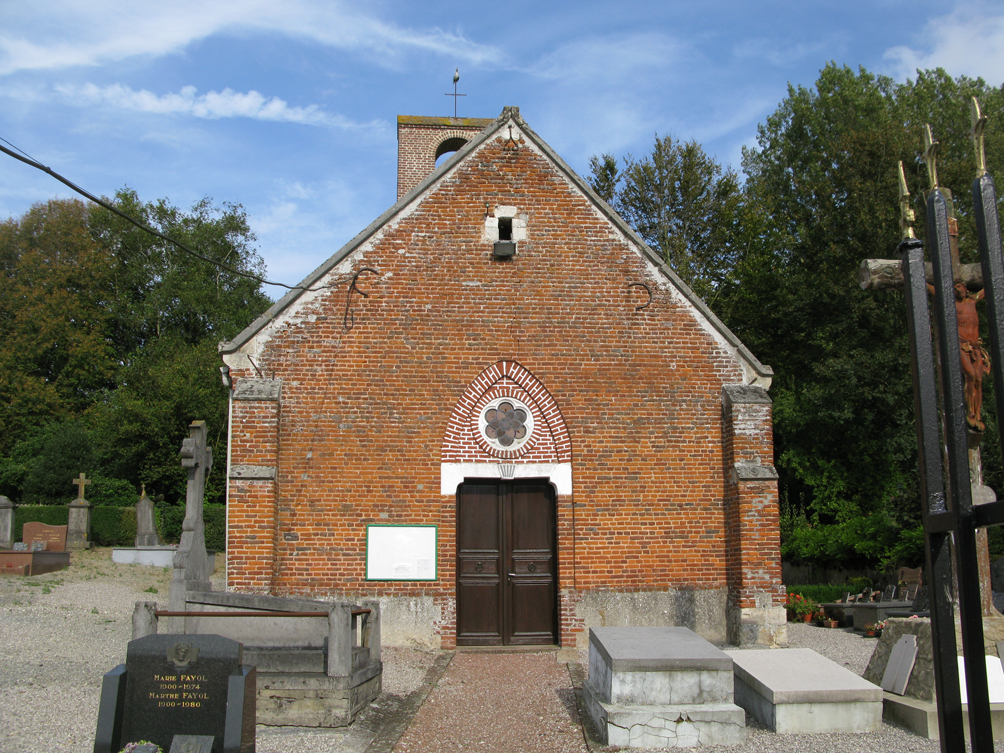
- The church of Maresville

- Coat of arms
- Location of Maresville
- Location within France Location within Hauts-de-France
- Coordinates: 50°31′36″N 1°44′00″E
- Country: France
- Region: Hauts-de-France
- Department: Pas-de-Calais
- Arrondissement: Montreuil
- Canton: Étaples
- Intercommunality: CA Deux Baies en Montreuillois

Government
  - Mayor (2020–2026): Maxime Delianne
- Area^{1}: 2.46 km^{2} (0.95 sq mi)
- Elevation: 11 m (36 ft)
- Highest elevation: 86 m (282 ft)
- Lowest elevation: 10 m (33 ft)
- Population (2023): 93
  - Density: 38/km^{2} (98/sq mi)
- Time zone: UTC+01:00 (CET)
  - Summer (DST): UTC+02:00 (CEST)
- INSEE/Postal code: 62554 /62630
- ^{1} French Land Register data, which excludes lakes, ponds, glaciers > 1 km^{2} (0.386 sq mi or 247 acres) and river estuaries.

Maresville (West Flemish: Mariadorp) is a commune in the Pas-de-Calais department in the Hauts-de-France region of France 4 miles (6 km) north of Montreuil-sur-Mer.

== Population ==
Historical population
Year	Pop.	±% p.a.
1968	53	—
1975	48	−1.41%
1982	72	+5.96%
1990	75	+0.51%
1999	73	−0.30%
2007	74	+0.17%
2012	89	+3.76%
2017	102	+2.76%
2023	93	−1.53%
Source: INSEE

== See also ==
- Communes of the Pas-de-Calais department
