= Chériennes =

- Commune
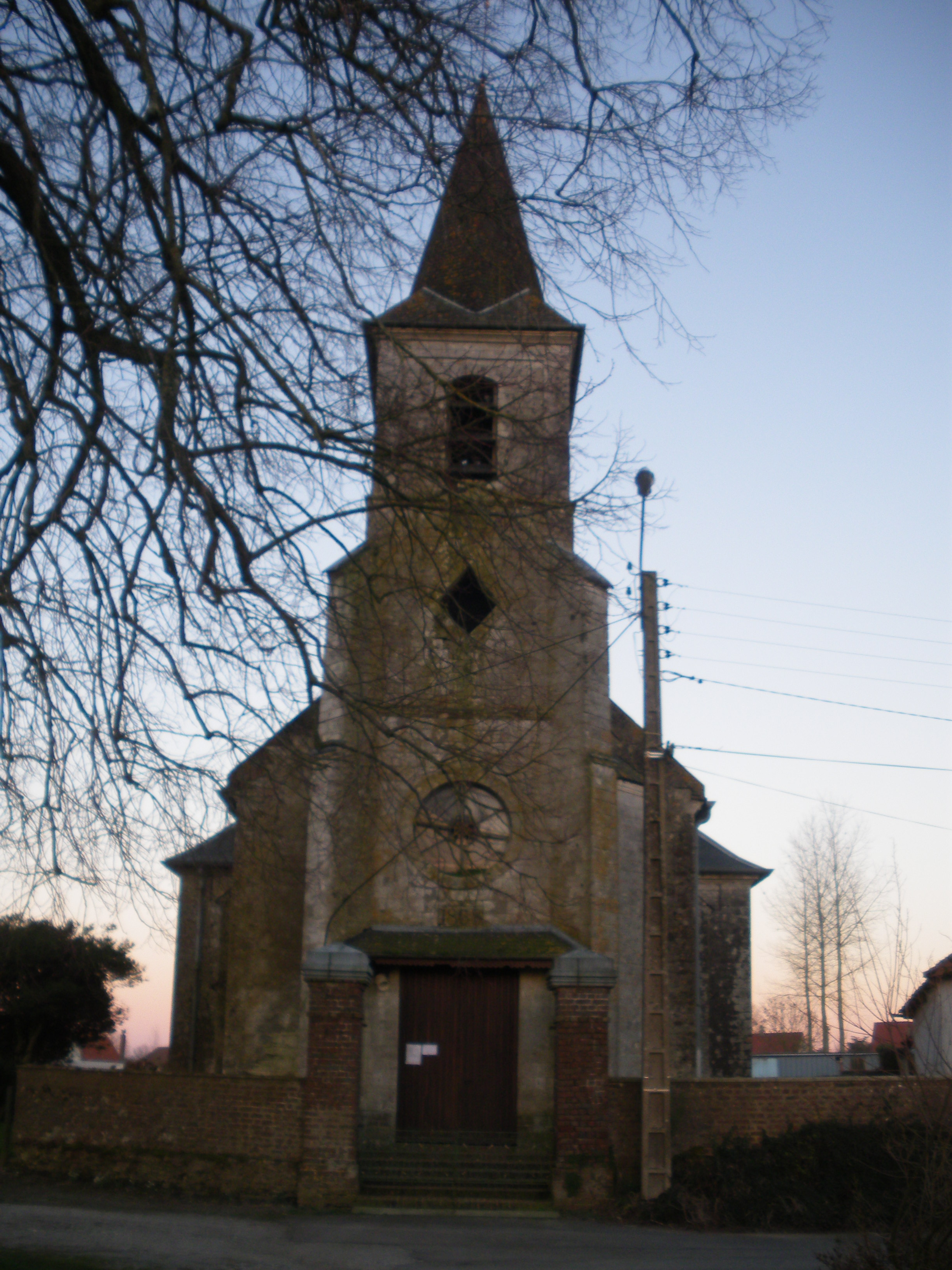
- The church of Chériennes

- Coat of arms
- Location of Chériennes
- Location within France Location within Hauts-de-France
- Coordinates: 50°18′52″N 2°02′12″E
- Country: France
- Region: Hauts-de-France
- Department: Pas-de-Calais
- Arrondissement: Montreuil
- Canton: Auxi-le-Château
- Intercommunality: CC des 7 Vallées

Government
  - Mayor (2020–2026): Mickaël Révillion
- Area^{1}: 4.65 km^{2} (1.80 sq mi)
- Elevation: 109 m (358 ft)
- Highest elevation: 133 m (436 ft)
- Lowest elevation: 55 m (180 ft)
- Population (2023): 174
  - Density: 37.4/km^{2} (96.9/sq mi)
- Time zone: UTC+01:00 (CET)
  - Summer (DST): UTC+02:00 (CEST)
- INSEE/Postal code: 62222 /62140
- ^{1} French Land Register data, which excludes lakes, ponds, glaciers > 1 km^{2} (0.386 sq mi or 247 acres) and river estuaries.

Chériennes (French pronunciation: [ʃeʁjɛn]; Picard: Chériène) is a commune in the Pas-de-Calais department in the Hauts-de-France region of France.

== Geography ==
Chériennes is a village situated some 20 miles (32 km) southeast of Montreuil-sur-Mer on the D134E3 road.

== Population ==
Historical population
Year	Pop.	±% p.a.
1968	245	—
1975	231	−0.84%
1982	219	−0.76%
1990	205	−0.82%
1999	182	−1.31%
2007	161	−1.52%
2012	147	−1.80%
2017	155	+1.07%
2023	174	+1.95%
Source: INSEE

== See also ==
- Communes of the Pas-de-Calais department
