= Longvilliers, Pas-de-Calais =

Longvilliers
- Commune
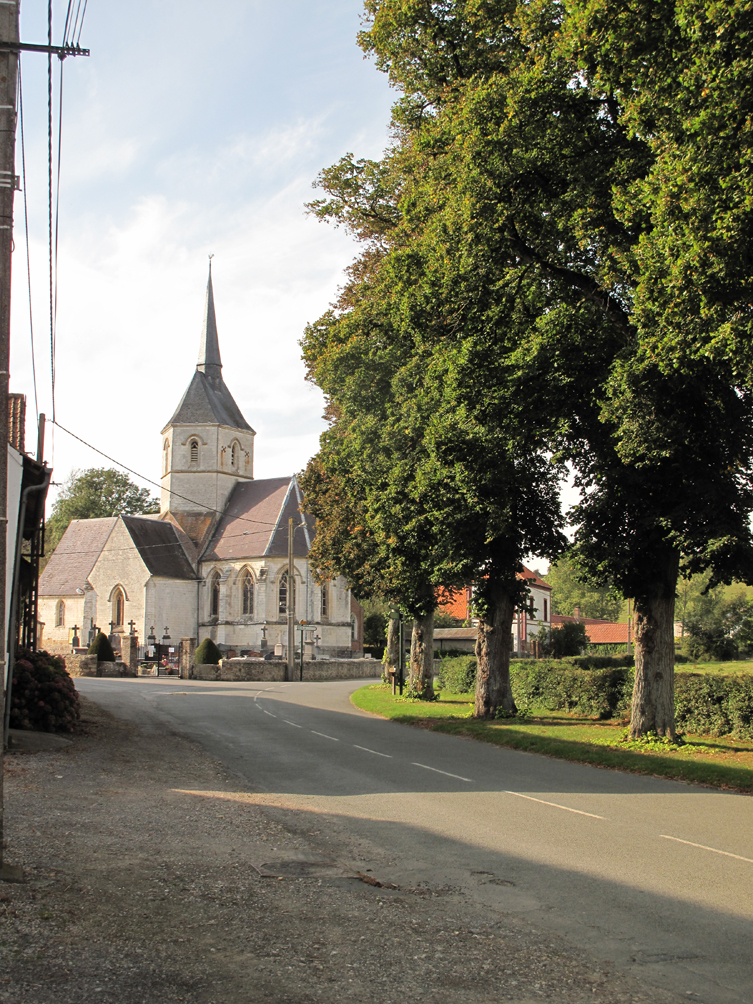
- The church of Longvilliers

- Coat of arms
- Location of Longvilliers
- Location within France Location within Hauts-de-France
- Coordinates: 50°32′40″N 1°43′42″E
- Country: France
- Region: Hauts-de-France
- Department: Pas-de-Calais
- Arrondissement: Montreuil
- Canton: Étaples
- Intercommunality: CA Deux Baies en Montreuillois

Government
  - Mayor (2020–2026): Philippe Petit
- Area^{1}: 10.99 km^{2} (4.24 sq mi)
- Elevation: 40 m (130 ft)
- Highest elevation: 120 m (390 ft)
- Lowest elevation: 19 m (62 ft)
- Population (2023): 253
  - Density: 23.0/km^{2} (59.6/sq mi)
- Time zone: UTC+01:00 (CET)
  - Summer (DST): UTC+02:00 (CEST)
- INSEE/Postal code: 62527 /62630
- ^{1} French Land Register data, which excludes lakes, ponds, glaciers > 1 km^{2} (0.386 sq mi or 247 acres) and river estuaries.

Longvilliers (French pronunciation: [lɔ̃vilje]; until 1997 Longvillers) is a commune in the Pas-de-Calais department in the Hauts-de-France region of France 5 miles (9 km) north of Montreuil-sur-Mer in the Dordonne river valley.

== Population ==
Historical population
| Year | Pop. | ±% p.a. |
|---|---|---|
| 1968 | 297 | — |
| 1975 | 263 | −1.72% |
| 1982 | 243 | −1.12% |
| 1990 | 244 | +0.05% |
| 1999 | 250 | +0.27% |
| 2007 | 229 | −1.09% |
| 2012 | 263 | +2.81% |
| 2017 | 247 | −1.25% |
| 2023 | 253 | +0.40% |
Source: INSEE

== See also ==
- Communes of the Pas-de-Calais department
