= Rumilly, Pas-de-Calais =

Rumilly
- Commune
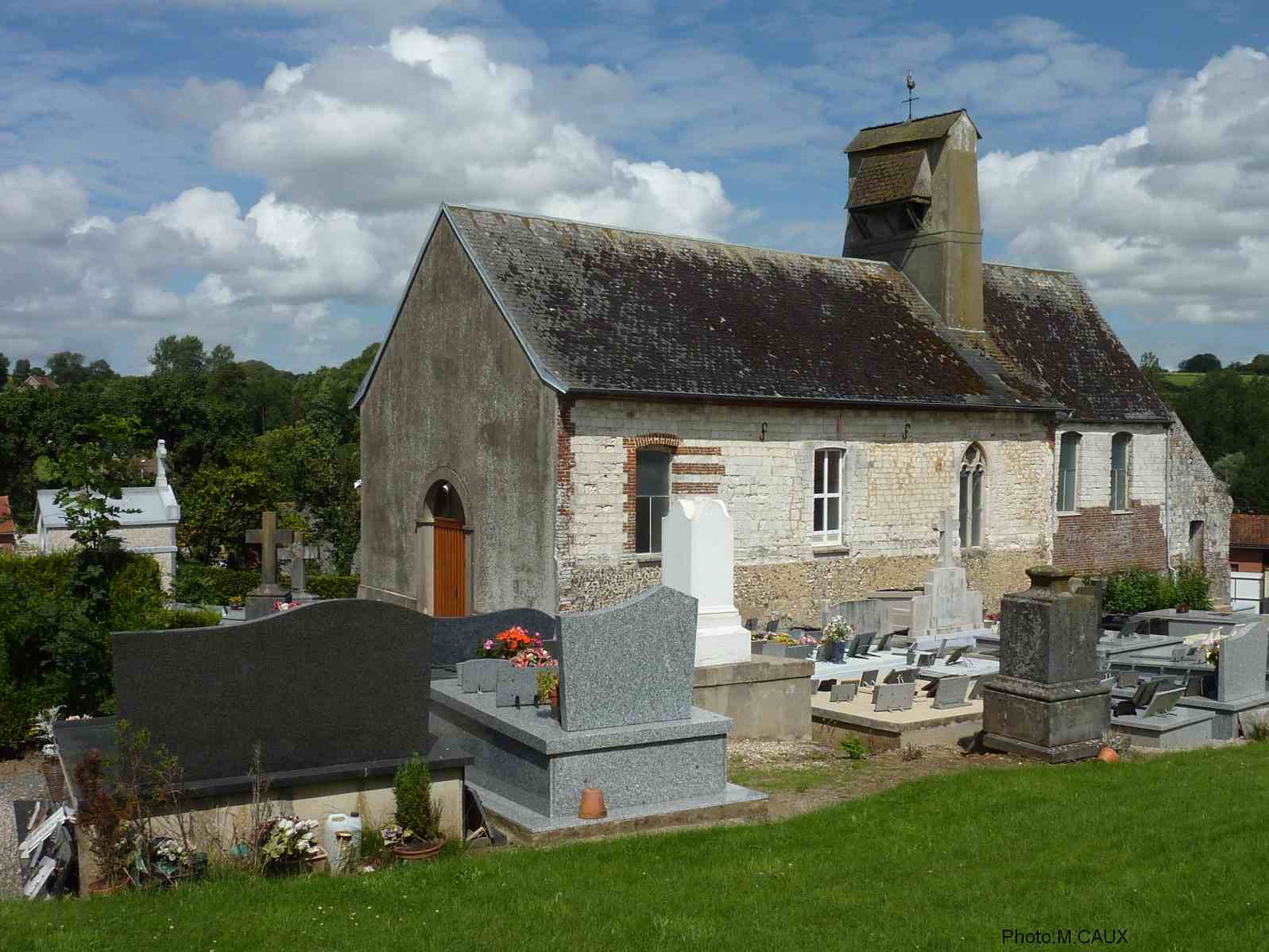
- The church of Rumilly

- Coat of arms
- Location of Rumilly
- Location within France Location within Hauts-de-France
- Coordinates: 50°34′38″N 2°00′56″E
- Country: France
- Region: Hauts-de-France
- Department: Pas-de-Calais
- Arrondissement: Montreuil
- Canton: Lumbres
- Intercommunality: CC Haut Pays du Montreuillois

Government
  - Mayor (2020–2026): Patrick Lavogez
- Area^{1}: 7.04 km^{2} (2.72 sq mi)
- Elevation: 97 m (318 ft)
- Highest elevation: 173 m (568 ft)
- Lowest elevation: 92 m (302 ft)
- Population (2023): 237
  - Density: 33.7/km^{2} (87.2/sq mi)
- Time zone: UTC+01:00 (CET)
  - Summer (DST): UTC+02:00 (CEST)
- INSEE/Postal code: 62729 /62650
- ^{1} French Land Register data, which excludes lakes, ponds, glaciers > 1 km^{2} (0.386 sq mi or 247 acres) and river estuaries.

Rumilly (French pronunciation: [ʁymiji]) is a commune in the Pas-de-Calais department in the Hauts-de-France region of France. 12 miles (19 km) northeast of Montreuil-sur-Mer in the valley of the Aa river.

== Population ==
Historical population
Year	Pop.	±% p.a.
1968	321	—
1975	292	−1.34%
1982	287	−0.25%
1990	260	−1.23%
1999	255	−0.22%
2007	259	+0.19%
2012	250	−0.70%
2017	254	+0.32%
2023	237	−1.15%
Source: INSEE

== See also ==
- Communes of the Pas-de-Calais department
