= Communes of the Pas-de-Calais department =

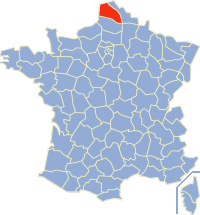

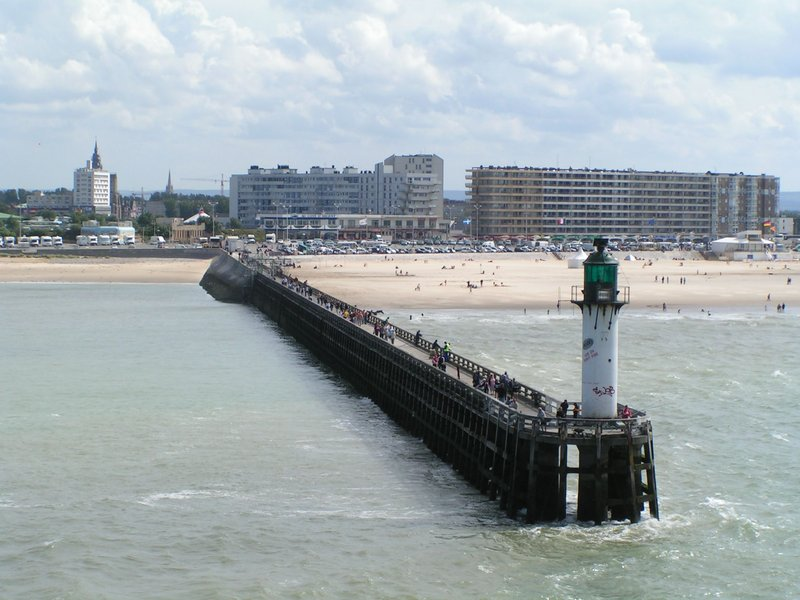

The following is a list of the 887 communes of the Pas-de-Calais department of France.

The communes cooperate in the following intercommunalities (as of 2025):

- Communauté urbaine d'Arras
- Communauté d'agglomération de Béthune-Bruay, Artois-Lys Romane
- Communauté d'agglomération du Boulonnais
- CA Grand Calais Terres et Mers
- Communauté d'agglomération des Deux Baies en Montreuillois
- Communauté d'agglomération d'Hénin-Carvin
- Communauté d'agglomération de Lens – Liévin
- Communauté d'agglomération du Pays de Saint-Omer
- Communauté de communes des 7 Vallées
- Communauté de communes des Campagnes de l'Artois
- Communauté de communes de Desvres-Samer
- Communauté de communes Flandre Lys (partly)
- Communauté de communes du Haut Pays du Montreuillois
- Communauté de communes Osartis Marquion
- Communauté de communes du Pays de Lumbres
- Communauté de communes des Pays d'Opale
- Communauté de communes de la Région d'Audruicq
- Communauté de communes du Sud-Artois
- Communauté de communes du Ternois (partly)
- Communauté de communes de la Terre des Deux Caps

INSEE code	Postal code	Commune
62001	62153	Ablain-Saint-Nazaire
62002	62116	Ablainzevelle
62003	62320	Acheville
62004	62217	Achicourt
62005	62121	Achiet-le-Grand
62006	62121	Achiet-le-Petit
62007	62144	Acq
62008	62380	Acquin-Westbécourt
62009	62116	Adinfer
62010	62380	Affringues
62011	62161	Agnez-lès-Duisans
62012	62690	Agnières
62013	62217	Agny
62014	62120	Aire-sur-la-Lys
62015	62180	Airon-Notre-Dame
62016	62180	Airon-Saint-Vaast
62017	62650	Aix-en-Ergny
62018	62170	Aix-en-Issart
62019	62160	Aix-Noulette
62020	62850	Alembon
62021	62650	Alette
62022	62142	Alincthun
62023	62157	Allouagne
62024	62850	Alquines
62025	62164	Ambleteuse
62026	62310	Ambricourt
62027	62127	Ambrines
62028	62190	Ames
62029	62260	Amettes
62030	62760	Amplier
62031	62340	Andres
62032	62143	Angres
62033	62880	Annay
62034	62149	Annequin
62035	62232	Annezin
62036	62134	Anvin
62037	62223	Anzin-Saint-Aubin
62038	62610	Ardres
62039	62580	Arleux-en-Gohelle
62040	62510	Arques
62041	62000	Arras
62042	62223	Athies
62043	62730	Les Attaques
62044	62170	Attin
62045	62690	Aubigny-en-Artois
62046	62140	Aubin-Saint-Vaast
62047	62390	Aubrometz
62048	62260	Auchel
62049	62190	Auchy-au-Bois
62050	62770	Auchy-lès-Hesdin
62051	62138	Auchy-les-Mines
62052	62250	Audembert
62053	62560	Audincthun
62054	62179	Audinghen
62055	62890	Audrehem
62056	62164	Audresselles
62057	62370	Audruicq
62058	62550	Aumerval
62059	62610	Autingues
62060	62390	Auxi-le-Château
62061	62127	Averdoingt
62062	62650	Avesnes
62063	62810	Avesnes-le-Comte
62064	62450	Avesnes-lès-Bapaume
62065	62210	Avion
62066	62310	Avondance
62067	62560	Avroult
62068	62116	Ayette
62069	62310	Azincourt
62070	62127	Bailleul-aux-Cornailles
62071	62550	Bailleul-lès-Pernes
62072	62123	Bailleulmont
62073	62580	Bailleul-Sir-Berthoult
62074	62123	Bailleulval
62075	62360	Baincthun
62076	62850	Bainghen
62077	62150	Bajus
62078	62610	Balinghem
62079	62450	Bancourt
62080	62450	Bapaume
62081	62860	Baralle
62082	62124	Barastre
62083	62620	Barlin
62084	62810	Barly
62085	62123	Basseux
62086	62158	Bavincourt
62087	62910	Bayenghem-lès-Éperlecques
62088	62380	Bayenghem-lès-Seninghem
62089	62250	Bazinghen
62090	62770	Béalencourt
62091	62810	Beaudricourt
62092	62810	Beaufort-Blavincourt
62093	62450	Beaulencourt
62094	62170	Beaumerie-Saint-Martin
62095	62960	Beaumetz-lès-Aire
62096	62124	Beaumetz-lès-Cambrai
62097	62123	Beaumetz-lès-Loges
62099	62217	Beaurains
62100	62990	Beaurainville
62881	62390	Beauvoir-Wavans
62101	62130	Beauvois
62102	62240	Bécourt
62103	62121	Béhagnies
62104	62142	Bellebrune
62105	62142	Belle-et-Houllefort
62471	62129	Bellinghem
62106	62490	Bellonne
62107	62410	Bénifontaine
62108	62600	Berck
62109	62134	Bergueneuse
62111	62810	Berlencourt-le-Cauroy
62112	62123	Berles-au-Bois
62113	62690	Berles-Monchel
62114	62130	Bermicourt
62115	62123	Berneville
62116	62170	Bernieulles
62117	62124	Bertincourt
62118	62690	Béthonsart
62119	62400	Béthune
62120	62150	Beugin
62121	62450	Beugnâtre
62122	62124	Beugny
62123	62170	Beussent
62124	62170	Beutin
62125	62250	Beuvrequen
62126	62660	Beuvry
62127	62650	Bezinghem
62128	62118	Biache-Saint-Vaast
62129	62450	Biefvillers-lès-Bapaume
62130	62111	Bienvillers-au-Bois
62131	62121	Bihucourt
62132	62138	Billy-Berclau
62133	62420	Billy-Montigny
62134	62650	Bimont
62135	62173	Blairville
62137	62270	Blangerval-Blangermont
62138	62770	Blangy-sur-Ternoise
62139	62575	Blendecques
62140	62380	Bléquin
62141	62120	Blessy
62142	62770	Blingel
62143	62390	Boffles
62144	62128	Boiry-Becquerelle
62145	62156	Boiry-Notre-Dame
62147	62175	Boiry-Sainte-Rictrude
62146	62175	Boiry-Saint-Martin
62148	62320	Bois-Bernard
62149	62500	Boisdinghem
62150	62170	Boisjean
62151	62175	Boisleux-au-Mont
62152	62175	Boisleux-Saint-Marc
62153	62960	Bomy
62154	62270	Bonnières
62155	62890	Bonningues-lès-Ardres
62156	62340	Bonningues-lès-Calais
62157	62990	Boubers-lès-Hesmond
62158	62270	Boubers-sur-Canche
62661	62140	Bouin-Plumoison
62160	62200	Boulogne-sur-Mer
62161	62340	Bouquehault
62162	62190	Bourecq
62163	62270	Bouret-sur-Canche
62164	62860	Bourlon
62165	62240	Bournonville
62166	62550	Bours
62167	62132	Boursin
62168	62650	Bourthes
62169	62380	Bouvelinghem
62170	62172	Bouvigny-Boyeffles
62171	62134	Boyaval
62172	62128	Boyelles
62173	62117	Brebières
62174	62610	Brêmes
62175	62140	Brévillers
62176	62170	Bréxent-Énocq
62180	62130	Brias
62177	62170	Brimeux
62178	62700	Bruay-la-Buissière
62179	62240	Brunembert
62181	62116	Bucquoy
62182	62390	Buire-au-Bois
62183	62870	Buire-le-Sec
62184	62860	Buissy
62185	62128	Bullecourt
62186	62160	Bully-les-Mines
62187	62130	Buneville
62188	62151	Burbure
62189	62124	Bus
62190	62350	Busnes
62191	62132	Caffiers
62192	62182	Cagnicourt
62193	62100	Calais
62194	62470	Calonne-Ricouart
62195	62350	Calonne-sur-la-Lys
62196	62170	La Calotterie
62197	62470	Camblain-Châtelain
62199	62690	Camblain-l'Abbé
62198	62690	Cambligneul
62200	62149	Cambrin
62201	62176	Camiers
62202	62650	Campagne-lès-Boulonnais
62203	62340	Campagne-lès-Guines
62204	62870	Campagne-lès-Hesdin
62205	62120	Campagne-lès-Wardrecques
62206	62170	Campigneulles-les-Grandes
62207	62170	Campigneulles-les-Petites
62208	62270	Canettemont
62209	62310	Canlers
62211	62690	Capelle-Fermont
62908	62360	La Capelle-lès-Boulogne
62212	62140	Capelle-lès-Hesdin
62213	62144	Carency
62214	62830	Carly
62215	62220	Carvin
62216	62158	La Cauchie
62217	62260	Cauchy-à-la-Tour
62218	62150	Caucourt
62219	62140	Caumont
62220	62140	Cavron-Saint-Martin
62221	62127	Chelers
62222	62140	Chériennes
62223	62128	Chérisy
62224	62920	Chocques
62225	62500	Clairmarais
62227	62650	Clenleu
62228	62890	Clerques
62229	62380	Cléty
62230	62142	Colembert
62231	62180	Colline-Beaumont
62232	62150	La Comté
62233	62180	Conchil-le-Temple
62234	62270	Conchy-sur-Canche
62235	62360	Condette
62236	62990	Contes
62238	62130	Conteville-en-Ternois
62237	62126	Conteville-lès-Boulogne
62239	62231	Coquelles
62240	62112	Corbehem
62241	62630	Cormont
62242	62760	Couin
62243	62158	Coullemont
62244	62137	Coulogne
62245	62380	Coulomby
62246	62310	Coupelle-Neuve
62247	62310	Coupelle-Vieille
62248	62121	Courcelles-le-Comte
62249	62970	Courcelles-lès-Lens
62250	62710	Courrières
62251	62240	Courset
62252	62136	La Couture
62253	62158	Couturelle
62254	62560	Coyecques
62255	62240	Crémarest
62256	62310	Crépy
62257	62310	Créquy
62258	62130	Croisette
62259	62128	Croisilles
62260	62130	Croix-en-Ternois
62261	62780	Cucq
62262	62149	Cuinchy
62263	62000	Dainville
62264	62187	Dannes
62265	62129	Delettes
62266	62810	Denier
62267	62560	Dennebrœucq
62268	62240	Desvres
62269	62460	Diéval
62270	62460	Divion
62271	62380	Dohem
62272	62116	Douchy-lès-Ayette
62273	62830	Doudeauville
62274	62119	Dourges
62275	62870	Douriez
62276	62138	Douvrin
62277	62320	Drocourt
62278	62131	Drouvin-le-Marais
62279	62161	Duisans
62280	62156	Dury
62281	62360	Echinghen
62282	62770	Éclimeux
62283	62270	Écoivres
62284	62860	Écourt-Saint-Quentin
62285	62128	Écoust-Saint-Mein
62286	62190	Ecquedecques
62288	62129	Ecques
62289	62170	Écuires
62290	62223	Écurie
62291	62300	Éleu-dit-Leauwette
62292	62380	Elnes
62293	62990	Embry
62295	62145	Enquin-lez-Guinegatte
62296	62650	Enquin-sur-Baillons
62297	62910	Éperlecques
62298	62860	Épinoy
62299	62134	Eps
62300	62224	Équihen-Plage
62301	62134	Équirre
62302	62650	Ergny
62303	62134	Érin
62304	62960	Erny-Saint-Julien
62306	62121	Ervillers
62307	62179	Escalles
62308	62850	Escœuilles
62309	62380	Esquerdes
62310	62400	Essars
62311	62880	Estevelles
62312	62170	Estrée
62313	62145	Estrée-Blanche
62314	62690	Estrée-Cauchy
62315	62170	Estréelles
62316	62810	Estrée-Wamin
62317	62156	Étaing
62318	62630	Étaples
62319	62156	Éterpigny
62320	62161	Étrun
62321	62141	Évin-Malmaison
62322	62760	Famechon
62323	62118	Fampoux
62324	62580	Farbus
62325	62560	Fauquembergues
62326	62450	Favreuil
62327	62960	Febvin-Palfart
62328	62260	Ferfay
62329	62250	Ferques
62330	62149	Festubert
62331	62223	Feuchy
62332	62173	Ficheux
62333	62134	Fiefs
62334	62132	Fiennes
62335	62770	Fillièvres
62336	62960	Fléchin
62337	62270	Flers
62338	62840	Fleurbaix
62339	62134	Fleury
62340	62550	Floringhem
62341	62111	Foncquevillers
62342	62134	Fontaine-lès-Boulans
62343	62128	Fontaine-lès-Croisilles
62344	62550	Fontaine-lès-Hermans
62345	62390	Fontaine-l'Étalon
62346	62270	Fortel-en-Artois
62347	62810	Fosseux
62348	62130	Foufflin-Ricametz
62349	62232	Fouquereuil
62350	62232	Fouquières-lès-Béthune
62351	62740	Fouquières-lès-Lens
62352	62130	Framecourt
62353	62450	Frémicourt
62354	62630	Frencq
62355	62490	Fresnes-lès-Montauban
62356	62150	Fresnicourt-le-Dolmen
62357	62770	Fresnoy
62358	62580	Fresnoy-en-Gohelle
62359	62140	Fressin
62360	62185	Fréthun
62361	62270	Frévent
62362	62127	Frévillers
62363	62690	Frévin-Capelle
62364	62310	Fruges
62365	62770	Galametz
62366	62150	Gauchin-Légal
62367	62130	Gauchin-Verloingt
62368	62760	Gaudiempré
62369	62580	Gavrelle
62370	62390	Gennes-Ivergny
62371	62580	Givenchy-en-Gohelle
62372	62810	Givenchy-le-Noble
62373	62149	Givenchy-lès-la-Bassée
62374	62121	Gomiécourt
62375	62111	Gommecourt
62376	62920	Gonnehem
62377	62199	Gosnay
62378	62123	Gouves
62379	62123	Gouy-en-Artois
62381	62127	Gouy-en-Ternois
62382	62870	Gouy-Saint-André
62380	62530	Gouy-Servins
62383	62112	Gouy-sous-Bellonne
62384	62147	Graincourt-lès-Havrincourt
62385	62810	Grand-Rullecourt
62386	62160	Grenay
62387	62450	Grévillers
62388	62140	Grigny
62389	62760	Grincourt-lès-Pas
62390	62600	Groffliers
62391	62330	Guarbecque
62392	62128	Guémappe
62393	62370	Guemps
62395	62140	Guigny
62396	62130	Guinecourt
62397	62340	Guînes
62398	62140	Guisy
62399	62123	Habarcq
62400	62940	Haillicourt
62401	62138	Haisnes
62402	62830	Halinghen
62403	62570	Hallines
62404	62760	Halloy
62405	62118	Hamblain-les-Prés
62406	62121	Hamelincourt
62407	62190	Ham-en-Artois
62408	62340	Hames-Boucres
62409	62111	Hannescamps
62410	62124	Haplincourt
62411	62390	Haravesnes
62412	62132	Hardinghen
62413	62440	Harnes
62414	62156	Haucourt
62415	62144	Haute-Avesnes
62416	62130	Hautecloque
62418	62810	Hauteville
62419	62850	Haut-Loquin
62421	62147	Havrincourt
62422	62111	Hébuterne
62423	62570	Helfaut
62424	62182	Hendecourt-lès-Cagnicourt
62425	62175	Hendecourt-lès-Ransart
62427	62110	Hénin-Beaumont
62426	62128	Héninel
62428	62128	Hénin-sur-Cojeul
62429	62142	Henneveux
62430	62760	Hénu
62432	62850	Herbinghen
62433	62130	Héricourt
62434	62158	La Herlière
62435	62130	Herlincourt
62436	62130	Herlin-le-Sec
62437	62650	Herly
62438	62690	Hermaville
62439	62132	Hermelinghen
62440	62147	Hermies
62441	62150	Hermin
62442	62130	Hernicourt
62443	62530	Hersin-Coupigny
62444	62179	Hervelinghen
62445	62196	Hesdigneul-lès-Béthune
62446	62360	Hesdigneul-lès-Boulogne
62448	62360	Hesdin-l'Abbé
62447	62140	Hesdin-la-Forêt
62449	62990	Hesmond
62450	62550	Hestrus
62451	62134	Heuchin
62452	62575	Heuringhem
62453	62310	Hézecques

INSEE code	Postal code	Commune
62454	62232	Hinges
62455	62850	Hocquinghen
62456	62620	Houchin
62457	62150	Houdain
62458	62910	Houlle
62459	62270	Houvin-Houvigneul
62460	62630	Hubersent
62462	62130	Huclier
62463	62650	Hucqueliers
62464	62410	Hulluch
62465	62158	Humbercamps
62466	62650	Humbert
62467	62130	Humerœuille
62468	62130	Humières
62469	62860	Inchy-en-Artois
62470	62770	Incourt
62472	62170	Inxent
62473	62330	Isbergues
62474	62360	Isques
62475	62810	Ivergny
62476	62490	Izel-lès-Équerchin
62477	62690	Izel-lès-Hameau
62478	62850	Journy
62479	62122	Labeuvrière
62480	62113	Labourse
62481	62140	Labroye
62483	62830	Lacres
62484	62159	Lagnicourt-Marcel
62485	62960	Laires
62486	62120	Lambres-lez-Aire
62487	62250	Landrethun-le-Nord
62488	62610	Landrethun-lès-Ardres
62489	62122	Lapugnoy
62490	62810	Lattre-Saint-Quentin
62491	62840	Laventie
62492	62990	Lebiez
62493	62124	Lebucquière
62494	62124	Léchelle
62495	62380	Ledinghem
62496	62630	Lefaux
62497	62790	Leforest
62498	62300	Lens
62499	62170	Lépine
62500	62190	Lespesses
62501	62990	Lespinoy
62502	62136	Lestrem
62503	62250	Leubringhen
62504	62500	Leulinghem
62505	62250	Leulinghen-Bernes
62907	62820	Libercourt
62506	62850	Licques
62507	62810	Liencourt
62508	62190	Lières
62509	62145	Liettres
62510	62800	Liévin
62511	62810	Lignereuil
62512	62960	Ligny-lès-Aire
62514	62127	Ligny-Saint-Flochel
62513	62270	Ligny-sur-Canche
62515	62450	Ligny-Thilloy
62516	62190	Lillers
62517	62120	Linghem
62518	62270	Linzeux
62519	62134	Lisbourg
62520	62400	Locon
62521	62140	La Loge
62523	62218	Loison-sous-Lens
62522	62990	Loison-sur-Créquoise
62524	62240	Longfossé
62525	62219	Longuenesse
62526	62142	Longueville
62527	62630	Longvilliers
62528	62750	Loos-en-Gohelle
62529	62840	Lorgies
62530	62240	Lottinghen
62531	62610	Louches
62532	62540	Lozinghem
62533	62310	Lugy
62534	62380	Lumbres
62535	62170	La Madelaine-sous-Montreuil
62536	62127	Magnicourt-en-Comte
62537	62270	Magnicourt-sur-Canche
62538	62870	Maintenay
62539	62130	Maisnil
62540	62620	Maisnil-lès-Ruitz
62541	62310	Maisoncelle
62542	62127	Maizières
62543	62120	Mametz
62544	62810	Manin
62545	62650	Maninghem
62546	62250	Maninghen-Henne
62547	62170	Marant
62548	62730	Marck
62550	62140	Marconnelle
62551	62990	Marenla
62552	62990	Maresquel-Ecquemicourt
62553	62550	Marest
62554	62630	Maresville
62555	62540	Marles-les-Mines
62556	62170	Marles-sur-Canche
62557	62161	Marœuil
62558	62127	Marquay
62559	62860	Marquion
62560	62250	Marquise
62561	62450	Martinpuich
62562	62310	Matringhem
62563	62670	Mazingarbe
62564	62120	Mazinghem
62565	62310	Mencas
62566	62240	Menneville
62567	62890	Mentque-Nortbécourt
62568	62217	Mercatel
62569	62560	Merck-Saint-Liévin
62570	62680	Méricourt
62571	62155	Merlimont
62572	62124	Metz-en-Couture
62573	62410	Meurchin
62574	62690	Mingoval
62576	62270	Moncheaux-lès-Frévent
62577	62270	Monchel-sur-Canche
62578	62123	Monchiet
62579	62111	Monchy-au-Bois
62580	62127	Monchy-Breton
62581	62134	Monchy-Cayeux
62582	62118	Monchy-le-Preux
62583	62760	Mondicourt
62584	62350	Mont-Bernanchon
62585	62170	Montcavrel
62586	62123	Montenescourt
62587	62640	Montigny-en-Gohelle
62588	62170	Montreuil
62589	62144	Mont-Saint-Éloi
62590	62130	Monts-en-Ternois
62591	62124	Morchies
62592	62910	Moringhem
62593	62450	Morval
62594	62159	Mory
62595	62910	Moulle
62596	62140	Mouriez
62597	62121	Moyenneville
62598	62890	Muncq-Nieurlet
62599	62142	Nabringhen
62600	62550	Nédon
62601	62550	Nédonchel
62602	62180	Nempont-Saint-Firmin
62603	62152	Nesles
62604	62152	Neufchâtel-Hardelot
62605	62770	Neulette
62606	62840	Neuve-Chapelle
62607	62130	Neuville-au-Cornet
62608	62124	Neuville-Bourjonval
62609	62580	Neuville-Saint-Vaast
62610	62170	Neuville-sous-Montreuil
62611	62217	Neuville-Vitasse
62612	62580	Neuvireuil
62614	62610	Nielles-lès-Ardres
62613	62380	Nielles-lès-Bléquin
62615	62185	Nielles-lès-Calais
62616	62390	Nœux-lès-Auxi
62617	62290	Nœux-les-Mines
62618	62890	Nordausques
62619	62128	Noreuil
62620	62120	Norrent-Fontes
62621	62370	Nortkerque
62622	62890	Nort-Leulinghem
62623	62370	Nouvelle-Église
62624	62950	Noyelles-Godault
62625	62770	Noyelles-lès-Humières
62626	62980	Noyelles-lès-Vermelles
62627	62490	Noyelles-sous-Bellonne
62628	62221	Noyelles-sous-Lens
62629	62123	Noyellette
62630	62810	Noyelle-Vion
62631	62270	Nuncq-Hautecôte
62632	62920	Oblinghem
62633	62130	Œuf-en-Ternois
62634	62370	Offekerque
62635	62990	Offin
62636	62250	Offrethun
62637	62590	Oignies
62638	62860	Oisy-le-Verger
62639	62580	Oppy
62640	62760	Orville
62641	62130	Ostreville
62642	62460	Ourton
62643	62230	Outreau
62644	62380	Ouve-Wirquin
62645	62215	Oye-Plage
62646	62860	Palluel
62647	62770	Le Parcq
62648	62650	Parenty
62649	62760	Pas-en-Artois
62650	62118	Pelves
62651	62127	Penin
62652	62550	Pernes
62653	62126	Pernes-lès-Boulogne
62654	62231	Peuplingues
62655	62130	Pierremont
62656	62570	Pihem
62657	62340	Pihen-lès-Guînes
62658	62126	Pittefaux
62659	62310	Planques
62660	62118	Plouvain
62662	62370	Polincove
62663	62760	Pommera
62664	62111	Pommier
62665	62390	Le Ponchel
62666	62880	Pont-à-Vendin
62667	62480	Le Portel
62668	62134	Prédefin
62669	62550	Pressy
62670	62650	Preures
62671	62860	Pronville-en-Artois
62672	62116	Puisieux
62673	62860	Quéant
62674	62500	Quelmes
62675	62380	Quercamps
62676	62120	Quernes
62677	62140	Le Quesnoy-en-Artois
62678	62240	Quesques
62679	62830	Questrecques
62680	62490	Quiéry-la-Motte
62681	62120	Quiestède
62682	62650	Quilen
62683	62390	Quœux-Haut-Maînil
62684	62120	Racquinghem
62685	62310	Radinghem
62686	62130	Ramecourt
62688	62180	Rang-du-Fliers
62689	62173	Ransart
62690	62140	Raye-sur-Authie
62692	62850	Rebergues
62693	62150	Rebreuve-Ranchicourt
62694	62270	Rebreuve-sur-Canche
62695	62270	Rebreuviette
62696	62560	Reclinghem
62697	62860	Récourt
62698	62170	Recques-sur-Course
62699	62890	Recques-sur-Hem
62700	62140	Regnauville
62701	62120	Rely
62702	62380	Remilly-Wirquin
62703	62156	Rémy
62704	62560	Renty
62705	62720	Rety
62706	62136	Richebourg
62708	62450	Riencourt-lès-Bapaume
62709	62182	Riencourt-lès-Cagnicourt
62710	62990	Rimboval
62711	62720	Rinxent
62712	62173	Rivière
62713	62350	Robecq
62714	62223	Roclincourt
62715	62450	Rocquigny
62716	62610	Rodelinghem
62717	62130	Roëllecourt
62718	62118	Rœux
62719	62770	Rollancourt
62720	62120	Rombly
62721	62120	Roquetoire
62722	62390	Rougefay
62723	62870	Roussent
62724	62320	Rouvroy
62725	62990	Royon
62726	62310	Ruisseauville
62727	62620	Ruitz
62728	62860	Rumaucourt
62729	62650	Rumilly
62730	62370	Ruminghem
62731	62124	Ruyaulcourt
62732	62550	Sachin
62733	62111	Sailly-au-Bois
62734	62490	Sailly-en-Ostrevent
62735	62113	Sailly-Labourse
62736	62840	Sailly-sur-la-Lys
62737	62114	Sains-en-Gohelle
62738	62310	Sains-lès-Fressin
62739	62860	Sains-lès-Marquion
62740	62550	Sains-lès-Pernes
62741	62760	Saint-Amand
62742	62170	Saint-Aubin
62691	62120	Saint-Augustin
62745	62990	Saint-Denœux
62744	62223	Sainte-Catherine
62756	62370	Sainte-Marie-Kerque
62746	62360	Saint-Étienne-au-Mont
62747	62350	Saint-Floris
62748	62370	Saint-Folquin
62749	62770	Saint-Georges
62750	62120	Saint-Hilaire-Cottes
62751	62250	Saint-Inglevert
62752	62170	Saint-Josse
62753	62223	Saint-Laurent-Blangy
62754	62128	Saint-Léger
62755	62360	Saint-Léonard
62758	62280	Saint-Martin-Boulogne
62759	62240	Saint-Martin-Choquel
62760	62560	Saint-Martin-d'Hardinghem
62757	62500	Saint-Martin-lez-Tatinghem
62761	62128	Saint-Martin-sur-Cojeul
62762	62650	Saint-Michel-sous-Bois
62763	62130	Saint-Michel-sur-Ternoise
62764	62223	Saint-Nicolas
62765	62500	Saint-Omer
62766	62162	Saint-Omer-Capelle
62767	62130	Saint-Pol-sur-Ternoise
62768	62870	Saint-Rémy-au-Bois
62769	62185	Saint-Tricat
62770	62350	Saint-Venant
62771	62430	Sallaumines
62772	62500	Salperwick
62773	62830	Samer
62774	62231	Sangatte
62775	62850	Sanghen
62776	62121	Sapignies
62777	62450	Le Sars
62778	62810	Sars-le-Bois
62779	62760	Sarton
62780	62860	Sauchy-Cauchy
62781	62860	Sauchy-Lestrée
62782	62860	Saudemont
62783	62870	Saulchoy
62784	62158	Saulty
62785	62690	Savy-Berlette
62786	62240	Selles
62787	62170	Sempy
62788	62380	Seninghem
62789	62240	Senlecques
62790	62310	Senlis
62791	62270	Séricourt
62792	62910	Serques
62793	62530	Servins
62794	62380	Setques
62795	62270	Sibiville
62796	62123	Simencourt
62797	62130	Siracourt
62798	62810	Sombrin
62799	62170	Sorrus
62800	62111	Souastre
62801	62153	Souchez
62802	62810	Le Souich
62803	62850	Surques
62804	62810	Sus-Saint-Léger
62805	62550	Tangry
62806	62179	Tardinghen
62808	62134	Teneur
62809	62127	Ternas
62810	62580	Thélus
62811	62129	Thérouanne
62812	62560	Thiembronne
62813	62130	La Thieuloye
62814	62760	Thièvres
62815	62180	Tigny-Noyelle
62816	62690	Tilloy-lès-Hermaville
62817	62217	Tilloy-lès-Mofflaines
62818	62134	Tilly-Capelle
62819	62500	Tilques
62820	62127	Tincques
62821	62830	Tingry
62822	62390	Tollent
62823	62310	Torcy
62824	62140	Tortefontaine
62825	62490	Tortequesne
62826	62520	Le Touquet-Paris-Plage
62827	62890	Tournehem-sur-la-Hem
62828	62310	Tramecourt
62829	62450	Le Transloy
62830	62147	Trescault
62831	62130	Troisvaux
62832	62630	Tubersent
62833	62270	Vacquerie-le-Boucq
62834	62140	Vacqueriette-Erquières
62835	62550	Valhuon
62836	62131	Vaudricourt
62837	62380	Vaudringhem
62838	62390	Vaulx
62839	62159	Vaulx-Vraucourt
62840	62124	Vélu
62841	62232	Vendin-lès-Béthune
62842	62880	Vendin-le-Vieil
62843	62310	Verchin
62844	62560	Verchocq
62845	62830	Verlincthun
62846	62980	Vermelles
62847	62113	Verquigneul
62848	62131	Verquin
62849	62180	Verton
62850	62770	Vieil-Hesdin
62851	62136	Vieille-Chapelle
62852	62162	Vieille-Église
62853	62240	Vieil-Moutier
62854	62144	Villers-au-Bois
62855	62450	Villers-au-Flos
62856	62690	Villers-Brûlin
62857	62690	Villers-Châtel
62858	62182	Villers-lès-Cagnicourt
62859	62390	Villers-l'Hôpital
62860	62127	Villers-Sir-Simon
62861	62580	Vimy
62862	62310	Vincly
62863	62138	Violaines
62864	62156	Vis-en-Artois
62865	62490	Vitry-en-Artois
62866	62180	Waben
62867	62250	Wacquinghen
62868	62770	Wail
62869	62217	Wailly
62870	62170	Wailly-Beaucamp
62871	62140	Wambercourt
62872	62770	Wamin
62873	62128	Wancourt
62874	62123	Wanquetin
62875	62120	Wardrecques
62876	62450	Warlencourt-Eaucourt
62877	62760	Warlincourt-lès-Pas
62878	62123	Warlus
62879	62810	Warluzel
62880	62142	Le Wast
62882	62380	Wavrans-sur-l'Aa
62883	62130	Wavrans-sur-Ternoise
62885	62960	Westrehem
62886	62650	Wicquinghem
62887	62630	Widehem
62888	62830	Wierre-au-Bois
62889	62720	Wierre-Effroy
62890	62770	Willeman
62891	62390	Willencourt
62892	62580	Willerval
62893	62930	Wimereux
62894	62126	Wimille
62895	62410	Wingles
62896	62240	Wirwignes
62897	62380	Wismes
62898	62219	Wisques
62899	62179	Wissant
62900	62120	Witternesse
62901	62120	Wittes
62902	62570	Wizernes
62909	62124	Ytres
62903	62650	Zoteux
62904	62890	Zouafques
62905	62500	Zudausques
62906	62370	Zutkerque
