= Bayenghem =

Bayenghem is part of the name of 2 communes in the Pas-de-Calais department of France:

- Bayenghem-lès-Éperlecques
- Bayenghem-lès-Seninghem
