= Rémilly =

Rémilly may refer to the following places in France:

- Rémilly, Moselle, a commune in the Moselle department
- Rémilly, Nièvre, a commune in the Nièvre department

See also

- Remilly-Wirquin, a commune in the Pas-de-Calais department
