= Nielles-lès-Bléquin =

- Commune
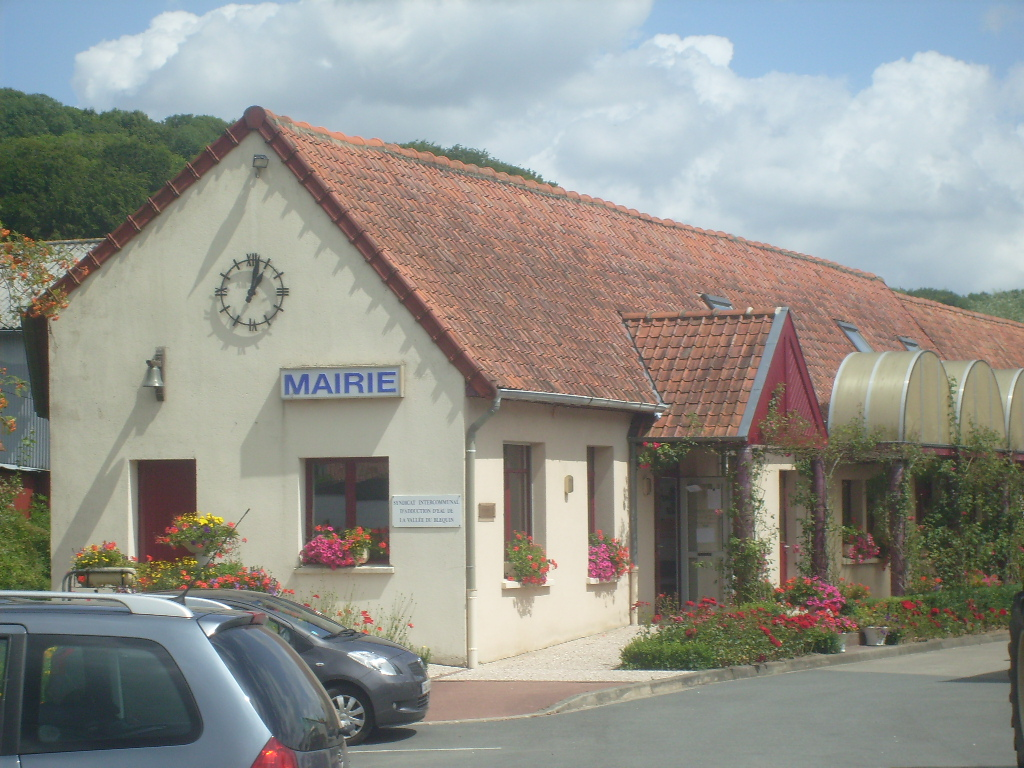
- The town hall of Nielles-lès-Bléquin

- Coat of arms
- Location of Nielles-lès-Bléquin
- Location within France Location within Hauts-de-France
- Coordinates: 50°40′30″N 2°01′58″E
- Country: France
- Region: Hauts-de-France
- Department: Pas-de-Calais
- Arrondissement: Saint-Omer
- Canton: Lumbres
- Intercommunality: Pays de Lumbres

Government
  - Mayor (2020–2026): Isabelle Leroy
- Area^{1}: 12.72 km^{2} (4.91 sq mi)
- Elevation: 125 m (410 ft)
- Highest elevation: 203 m (666 ft)
- Lowest elevation: 67 m (220 ft)
- Population (2023): 902
  - Density: 70.9/km^{2} (184/sq mi)
- Time zone: UTC+01:00 (CET)
  - Summer (DST): UTC+02:00 (CEST)
- INSEE/Postal code: 62613 /62380
- ^{1} French Land Register data, which excludes lakes, ponds, glaciers > 1 km^{2} (0.386 sq mi or 247 acres) and river estuaries.

Nielles-lès-Bléquin (French pronunciation: [njɛl lɛ blekɛ̃], literally Nielles near Bléquin) is a commune in the Pas-de-Calais department in the Hauts-de-France region of France.

== Geography ==
Nielles-lès-Bléquin lies about 12 miles (19 km) southwest of Saint-Omer, at the junction of the D191 and D202 roads, on the banks of the small river Bléquin.

== Population ==
Historical population
| Year | Pop. | ±% p.a. |
|---|---|---|
| 1968 | 780 | — |
| 1975 | 714 | −1.26% |
| 1982 | 755 | +0.80% |
| 1990 | 760 | +0.08% |
| 1999 | 795 | +0.50% |
| 2007 | 819 | +0.37% |
| 2012 | 862 | +1.03% |
| 2017 | 847 | −0.35% |
| 2023 | 902 | +1.05% |
Source: INSEE

== Places of interest ==
- The church of St. Martin, dating from the twelfth century.

== See also ==
- Communes of the Pas-de-Calais department
