= Haut-Loquin =

Haut-Loquin Hoog-Loken
- Commune
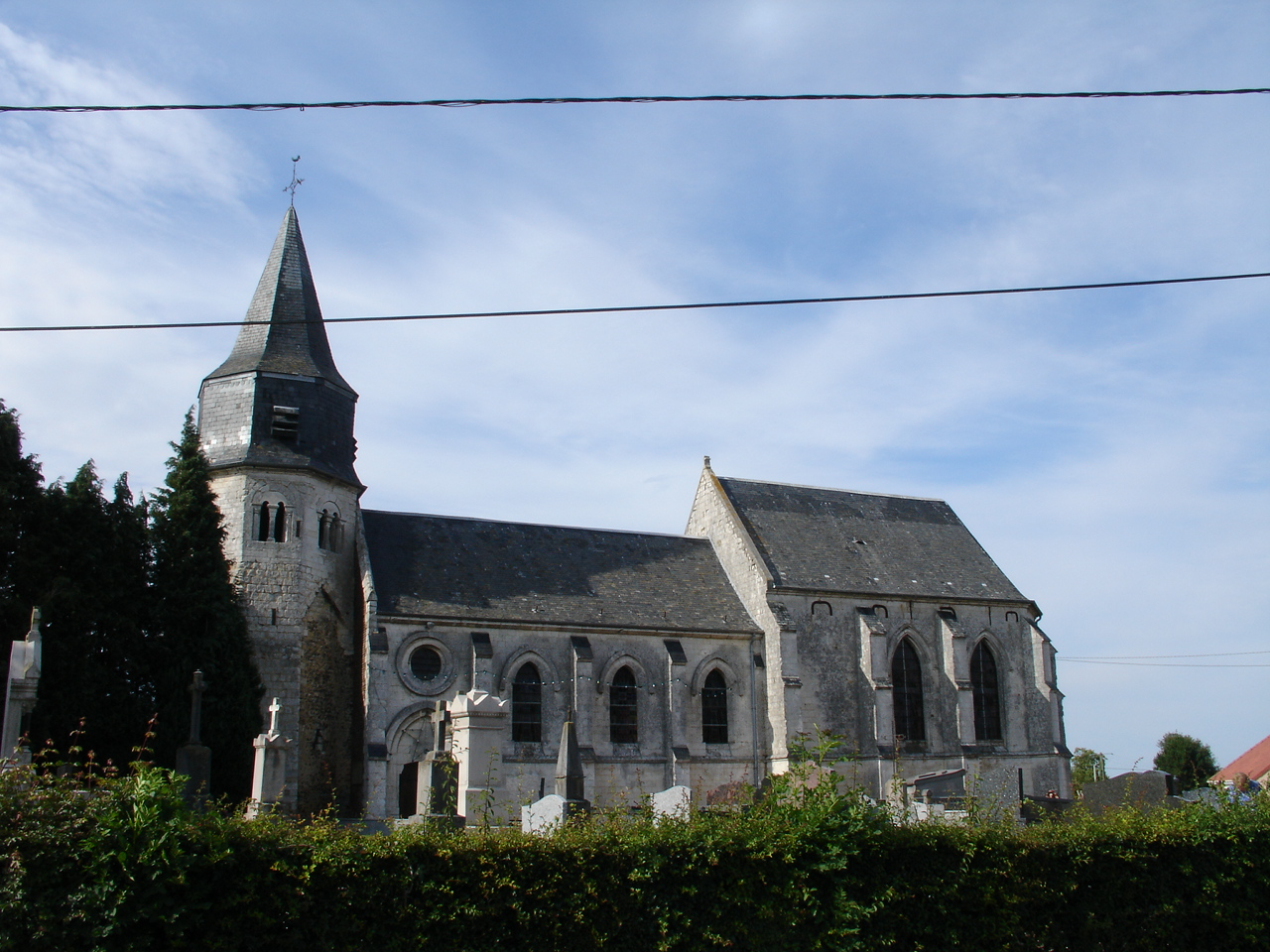
- The church of Haut-Loquin

- Coat of arms
- Location of Haut-Loquin
- Location within France Location within Hauts-de-France
- Coordinates: 50°44′26″N 1°58′06″E
- Country: France
- Region: Hauts-de-France
- Department: Pas-de-Calais
- Arrondissement: Saint-Omer
- Canton: Lumbres
- Intercommunality: Pays de Lumbres

Government
  - Mayor (2020–2026): Jean-Michel Croquelois
- Area^{1}: 5.47 km^{2} (2.11 sq mi)
- Elevation: 110 m (360 ft)
- Highest elevation: 210 m (690 ft)
- Lowest elevation: 78 m (256 ft)
- Population (2023): 189
  - Density: 34.6/km^{2} (89.5/sq mi)
- Time zone: UTC+01:00 (CET)
  - Summer (DST): UTC+02:00 (CEST)
- INSEE/Postal code: 62419 /62850
- ^{1} French Land Register data, which excludes lakes, ponds, glaciers > 1 km^{2} (0.386 sq mi or 247 acres) and river estuaries.

Haut-Loquin (French pronunciation: [o lɔkɛ̃]; West Flemish: Hoog-Loken) is a commune in the Pas-de-Calais department in the [Hauts-de-France region of France 11 miles (18 km) west of Saint-Omer.

== Population ==
Historical population
Year	Pop.	±% p.a.
1968	164	—
1975	149	−1.36%
1982	151	+0.19%
1990	145	−0.51%
1999	133	−0.96%
2007	151	+1.60%
2012	171	+2.52%
2017	185	+1.59%
2023	189	+0.36%
Source: INSEE

== See also ==
- Communes of the Pas-de-Calais department
