= Alquines =

Alquines Alken
- Commune
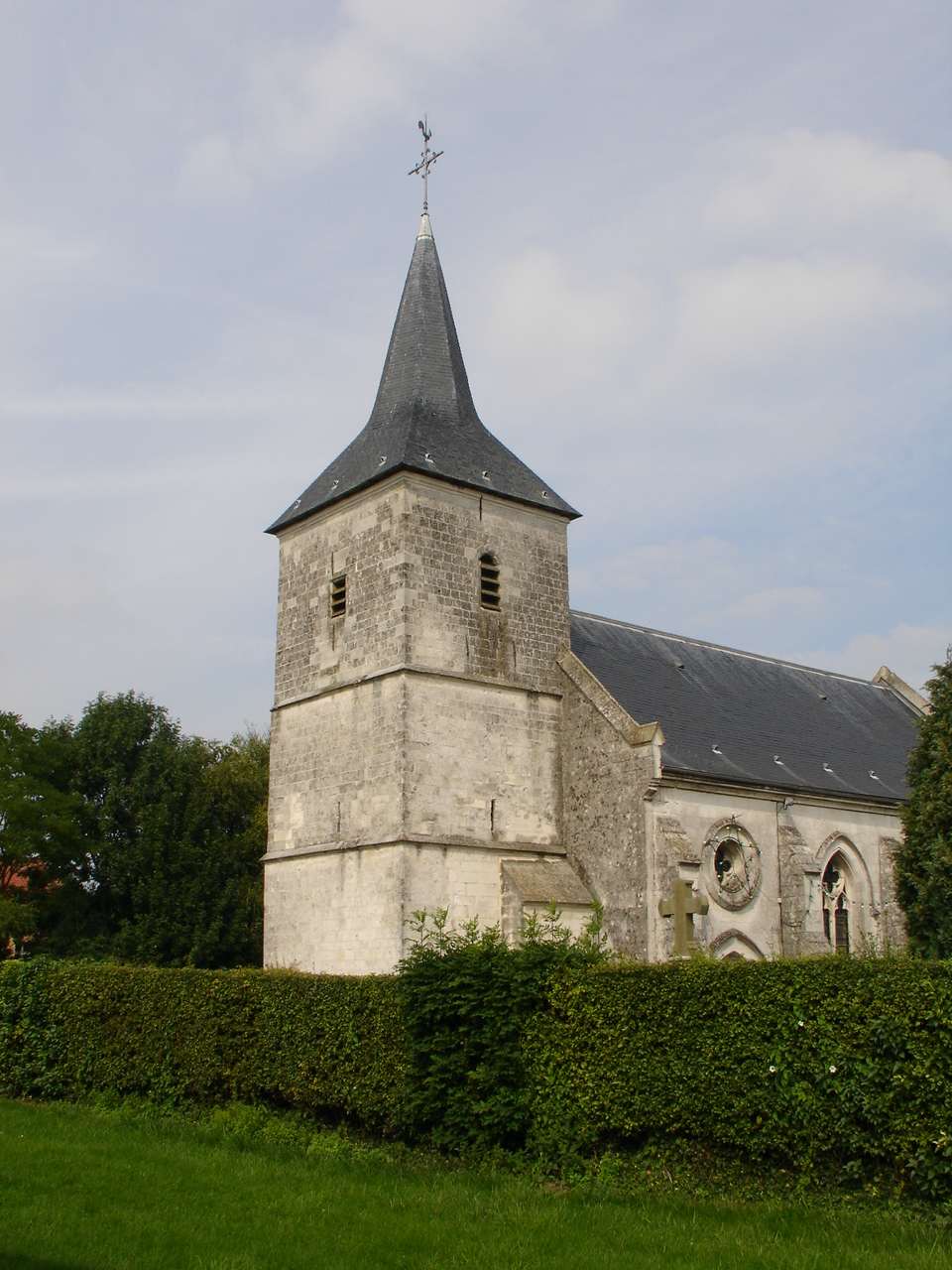
- The church of Alquines

- Coat of arms
- Location of Alquines
- Location within France Location within Hauts-de-France
- Coordinates: 50°44′28″N 1°59′35″E
- Country: France
- Region: Hauts-de-France
- Department: Pas-de-Calais
- Arrondissement: Saint-Omer
- Canton: Lumbres
- Intercommunality: Pays de Lumbres

Government
  - Mayor (2020–2026): Jean-Marie Allouchery
- Area^{1}: 10.51 km^{2} (4.06 sq mi)
- Elevation: 100 m (330 ft)
- Highest elevation: 211 m (692 ft)
- Lowest elevation: 83 m (272 ft)
- Population (2023): 973
  - Density: 92.6/km^{2} (240/sq mi)
- Time zone: UTC+01:00 (CET)
  - Summer (DST): UTC+02:00 (CEST)
- INSEE/Postal code: 62024 /62850
- ^{1} French Land Register data, which excludes lakes, ponds, glaciers > 1 km^{2} (0.386 sq mi or 247 acres) and river estuaries.

Alquines (French pronunciation: [alkin]; West Flemish: Alken) is a commune in the Pas-de-Calais department in northern France.

== Geography ==
A town located 18 miles (29 km) east of Boulogne-sur-Mer, at the junction of the D216 with the D191 road, by the banks of the river Hem.

== Population ==
Historical population
Year	Pop.	±% p.a.
1968	606	—
1975	613	+0.16%
1982	675	+1.39%
1990	745	+1.24%
1999	751	+0.09%
2007	861	+1.72%
2012	908	+1.07%
2017	999	+1.93%
2023	973	−0.44%
Source: INSEE

== Sights ==
- The sixteenth century church.
- Remains of a feudal motte.
- The Chapel de Fromentel.
- The war memorial.

== Transport ==
The Chemin de fer d'Anvin à Calais opened a railway station serving Alquines and Boiusson in 1881. The railway was closed in 1955.

== See also ==
- Communes of the Pas-de-Calais department
