= Quelmes =

Quelmes Kelmes
- Commune
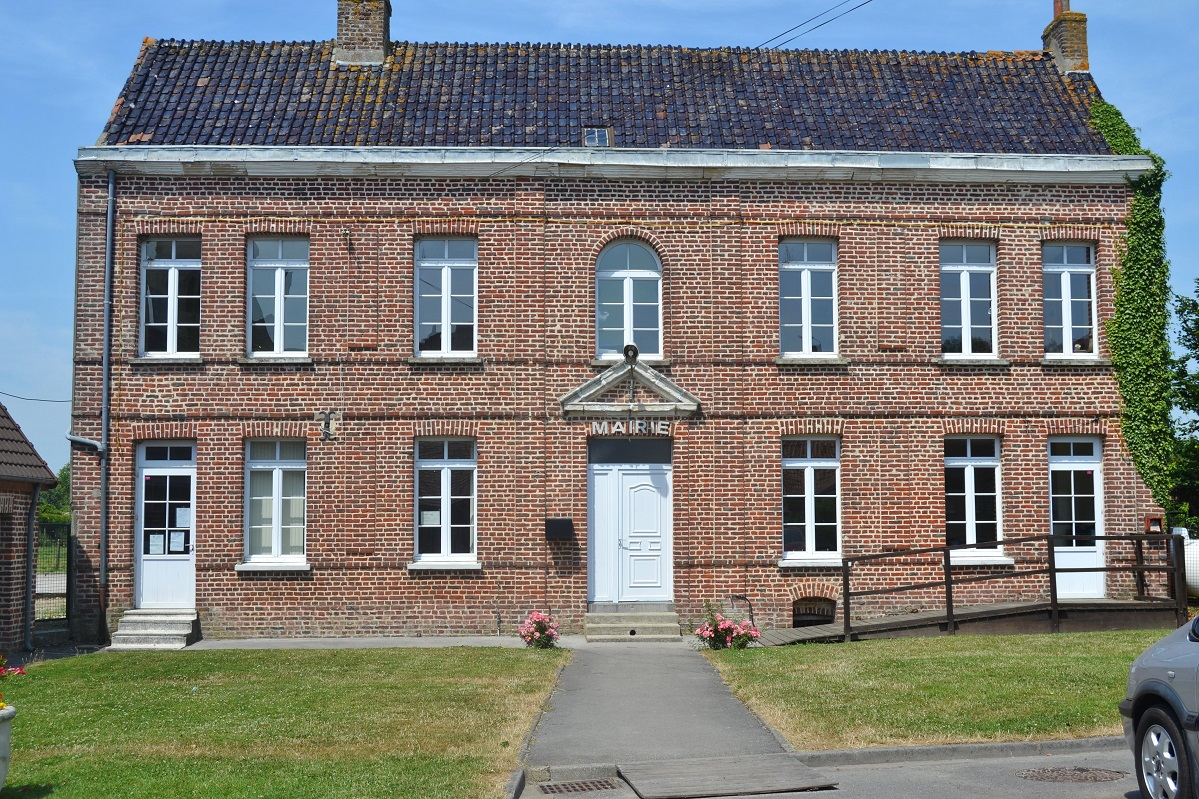
- The town hall of Quelmes

- Coat of arms
- Location of Quelmes
- Location within France Location within Hauts-de-France
- Coordinates: 50°44′02″N 2°08′17″E
- Country: France
- Region: Hauts-de-France
- Department: Pas-de-Calais
- Arrondissement: Saint-Omer
- Canton: Lumbres
- Intercommunality: Pays de Lumbres

Government
  - Mayor (2020–2026): André Cordier
- Area^{1}: 9.86 km^{2} (3.81 sq mi)
- Elevation: 121 m (397 ft)
- Highest elevation: 158 m (518 ft)
- Lowest elevation: 55 m (180 ft)
- Population (2023): 529
  - Density: 53.7/km^{2} (139/sq mi)
- Time zone: UTC+01:00 (CET)
  - Summer (DST): UTC+02:00 (CEST)
- INSEE/Postal code: 62674 /62500
- ^{1} French Land Register data, which excludes lakes, ponds, glaciers > 1 km^{2} (0.386 sq mi or 247 acres) and river estuaries.

Quelmes (French pronunciation: [kɛlm]; West Flemish: Kelmes) is a commune in the Pas-de-Calais department in the Hauts-de-France region of France.

== Geography ==
Quelmes lies about 5 miles (8 km) west of Saint-Omer, at the junction of the D208 and D207 roads and bordered by the A26 motorway.

== Population ==
Historical population
Year	Pop.	±% p.a.
1968	246	—
1975	262	+0.90%
1982	371	+5.09%
1990	445	+2.30%
1999	447	+0.05%
2007	579	+3.29%
2012	562	−0.59%
2017	576	+0.49%
2023	529	−1.41%
Source: INSEE

== Places of interest ==
- The church of St.Pierre, dating from the thirteenth century.

== See also ==
- Communes of the Pas-de-Calais department
