= Dohem =

Dohem Dallem
- Commune
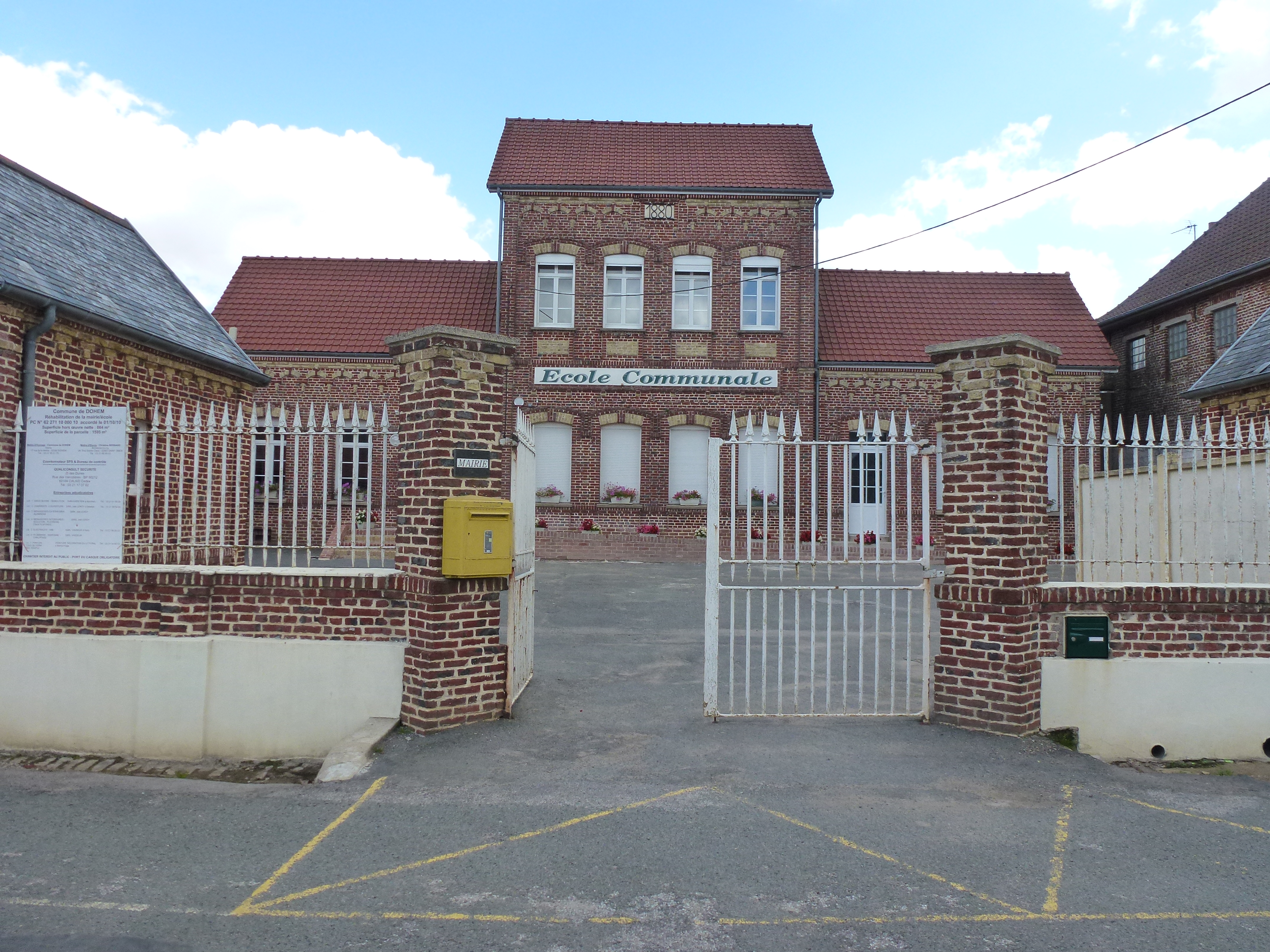
- The town hall and school of Dohem

- Coat of arms
- Location of Dohem
- Location within France Location within Hauts-de-France
- Coordinates: 50°38′20″N 2°11′12″E
- Country: France
- Region: Hauts-de-France
- Department: Pas-de-Calais
- Arrondissement: Saint-Omer
- Canton: Lumbres
- Intercommunality: Pays de Lumbres

Government
  - Mayor (2024–2026): David Dambrune
- Area^{1}: 9.16 km^{2} (3.54 sq mi)
- Elevation: 136 m (446 ft)
- Highest elevation: 151 m (495 ft)
- Lowest elevation: 60 m (200 ft)
- Population (2023): 826
  - Density: 90.2/km^{2} (234/sq mi)
- Time zone: UTC+01:00 (CET)
  - Summer (DST): UTC+02:00 (CEST)
- INSEE/Postal code: 62271 /62380
- ^{1} French Land Register data, which excludes lakes, ponds, glaciers > 1 km^{2} (0.386 sq mi or 247 acres) and river estuaries.

Dohem (French pronunciation: [dɔɑ̃]; West Flemish: Dallem; Picard: Dohin) is a commune in the Pas-de-Calais department in the Hauts-de-France region of France 9 miles (14 km) southwest of Saint-Omer.

== Population ==
Historical population
Year	Pop.	±% p.a.
1968	575	—
1975	613	+0.92%
1982	687	+1.64%
1990	705	+0.32%
1999	712	+0.11%
2007	750	+0.65%
2012	813	+1.63%
2017	828	+0.37%
2023	826	−0.04%
Source: INSEE

== See also ==
- Communes of the Pas-de-Calais department
