= Affringues =

- Commune
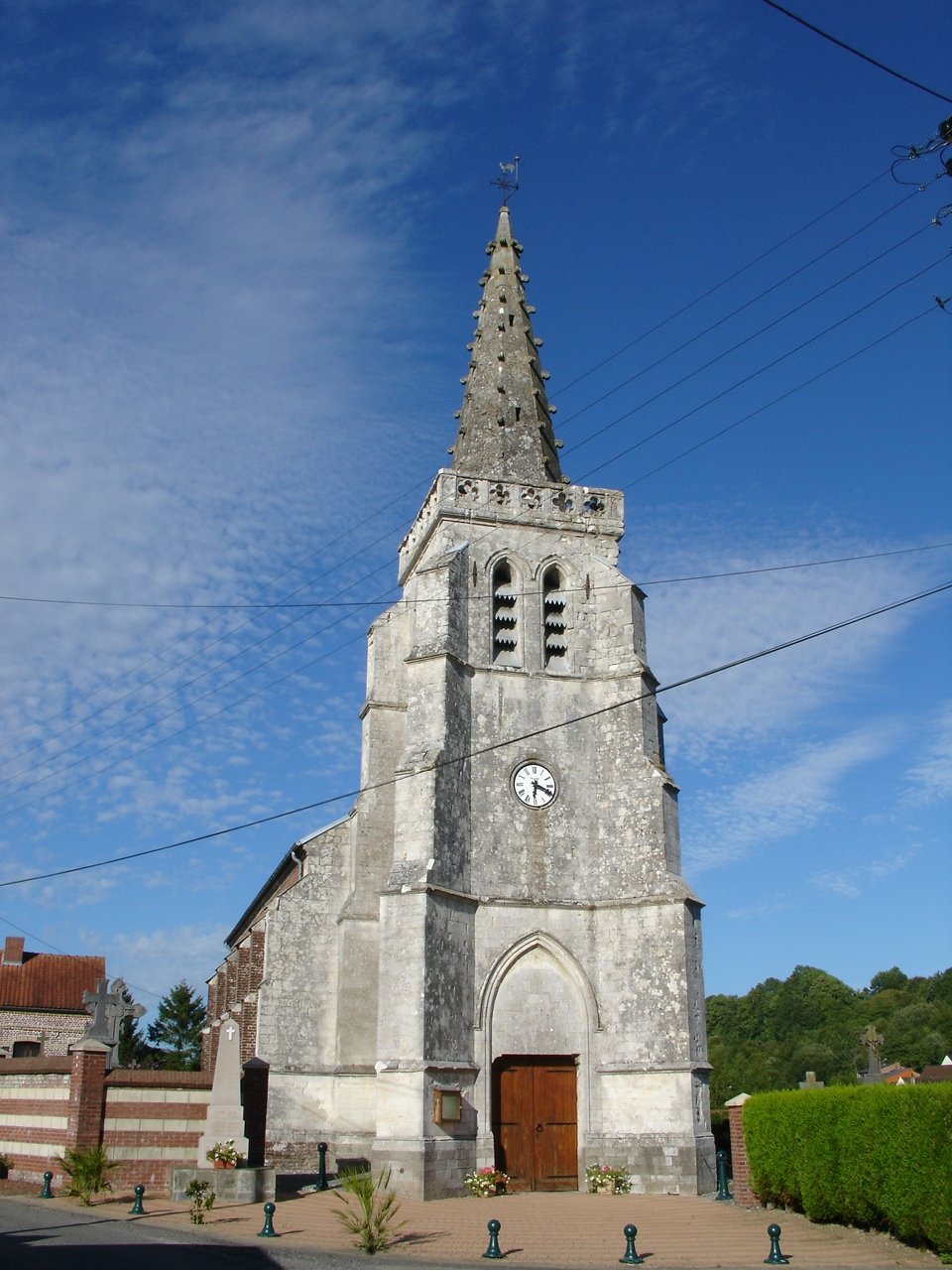
- The church of Affringues

- Coat of arms
- Location of Affringues
- Location within France Location within Hauts-de-France
- Coordinates: 50°41′23″N 2°04′27″E
- Country: France
- Region: Hauts-de-France
- Department: Pas-de-Calais
- Arrondissement: Saint-Omer
- Canton: Lumbres
- Intercommunality: Pays de Lumbres

Government
  - Mayor (2020–2026): Isabelle Pourchel
- Area^{1}: 2.81 km^{2} (1.08 sq mi)
- Elevation: 73 m (240 ft)
- Highest elevation: 158 m (518 ft)
- Lowest elevation: 52 m (171 ft)
- Population (2023): 254
  - Density: 90.4/km^{2} (234/sq mi)
- Time zone: UTC+01:00 (CET)
  - Summer (DST): UTC+02:00 (CEST)
- INSEE/Postal code: 62010 /62380
- ^{1} French Land Register data, which excludes lakes, ponds, glaciers > 1 km^{2} (0.386 sq mi or 247 acres) and river estuaries.

Affringues (French pronunciation: [afʁɛ̃ɡ]) is a commune in the Pas-de-Calais department in northern France. The placename derives from medieval Flemish: Hafferdingen.

== Geography ==
A village, located 9 miles (15 km) southwest of Saint-Omer, at the D205 and D202 crossroads.

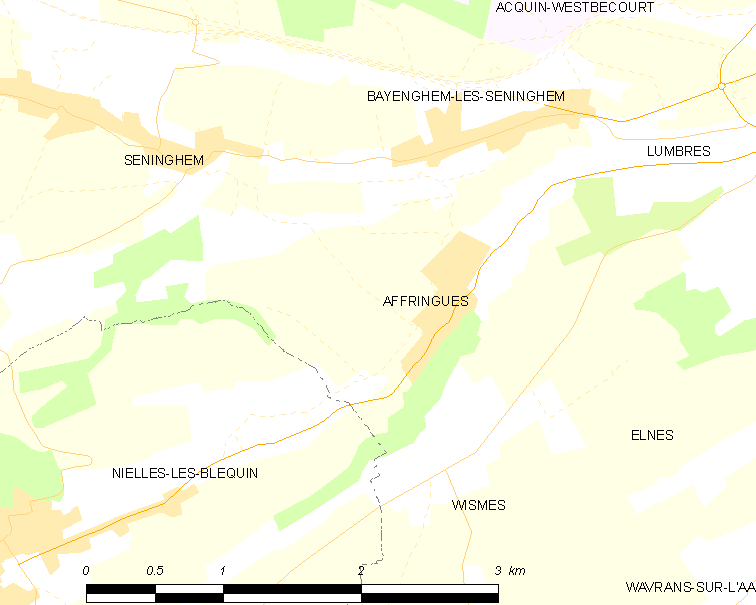
Map of the commune and adjacent places

== History ==
First mentioned in the 12th century by the names Hafferdinges (± 1182) and Harfrenges (1186).

== Population ==
Historical population
Year	Pop.	±% p.a.
1968	123	—
1975	145	+2.38%
1982	166	+1.95%
1990	219	+3.52%
1999	203	−0.84%
2007	219	+0.95%
2012	209	−0.93%
2017	239	+2.72%
2023	254	+1.02%
Source: INSEE

== Sights ==
- The church of St.Leger, dating from the sixteenth century, with a stone spire.

== See also ==
- Communes of the Pas-de-Calais department
