= Canton of Lumbres =

Coordinates: 50°41′57″N 2°05′35″E

Lumbres
- Canton
- Location of Lumbres within the department
- Country: France
- Region: Hauts-de-France
- Department: Pas-de-Calais
- No. of communes: {{{nbcomm}}}
- Area: 501.04 km^{2} (193.45 sq mi)
- Population (2023): 32,579
  - Density: 65.023/km^{2} (168.41/sq mi)
- INSEE code: 62 33

The canton of Lumbres (West Flemish: Lumeres) is a canton situated in the department of the Pas-de-Calais and in the northern Hauts-de-France region of France. The canton is organised around the town of Lumbres.

== Composition ==
At the French canton reorganisation which came into effect in March 2015, the canton was expanded from 33 to 60 communes:

- Acquin-Westbécourt
- Affringues
- Aix-en-Ergny
- Alette
- Alquines
- Audrehem
- Avesnes
- Bayenghem-lès-Seninghem
- Bécourt
- Beussent
- Bezinghem
- Bimont
- Bléquin
- Boisdinghem
- Bonningues-lès-Ardres
- Bourthes
- Bouvelinghem
- Campagne-lès-Boulonnais
- Clenleu
- Clerques
- Cléty
- Coulomby
- Dohem
- Elnes
- Enquin-sur-Baillons
- Ergny
- Escœuilles
- Esquerdes
- Haut-Loquin
- Herly
- Hucqueliers
- Humbert
- Journy
- Ledinghem
- Leulinghem
- Lumbres
- Maninghem
- Nielles-lès-Bléquin
- Ouve-Wirquin
- Parenty
- Pihem
- Preures
- Quelmes
- Quercamps
- Quilen
- Rebergues
- Remilly-Wirquin
- Rumilly
- Saint-Michel-sous-Bois
- Seninghem
- Setques
- Surques
- Vaudringhem
- Verchocq
- Wavrans-sur-l'Aa
- Wicquinghem
- Wismes
- Wisques
- Zoteux
- Zudausques

== Population ==
Historical population
Year	Pop.	±% p.a.
2013	32,247	—
2018	32,530	+0.17%
Source: INSEE

== See also ==
- Cantons of Pas-de-Calais
- Communes of Pas-de-Calais
- Arrondissements of the Pas-de-Calais department
