= Ledinghem =

Ledinghem Ledingem
- Commune
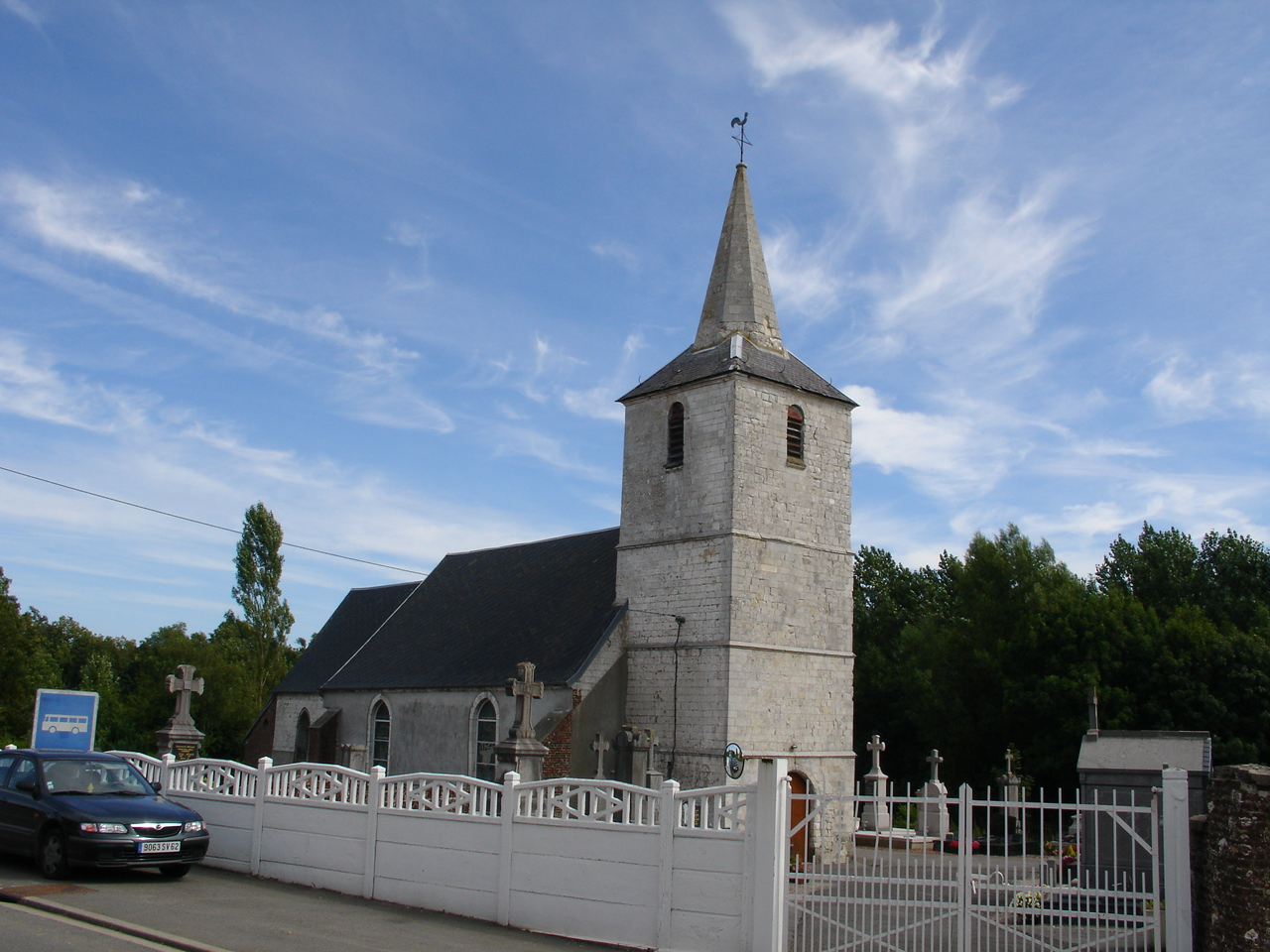
- The church of Ledinghem

- Coat of arms
- Location of Ledinghem
- Location within France Location within Hauts-de-France
- Coordinates: 50°39′15″N 1°59′35″E
- Country: France
- Region: Hauts-de-France
- Department: Pas-de-Calais
- Arrondissement: Saint-Omer
- Canton: Lumbres
- Intercommunality: Pays de Lumbres

Government
  - Mayor (2020–2026): Olivier Dufour
- Area^{1}: 8.68 km^{2} (3.35 sq mi)
- Elevation: 122 m (400 ft)
- Highest elevation: 202 m (663 ft)
- Lowest elevation: 100 m (330 ft)
- Population (2023): 316
  - Density: 36.4/km^{2} (94.3/sq mi)
- Time zone: UTC+01:00 (CET)
  - Summer (DST): UTC+02:00 (CEST)
- INSEE/Postal code: 62495 /62380
- ^{1} French Land Register data, which excludes lakes, ponds, glaciers > 1 km^{2} (0.386 sq mi or 247 acres) and river estuaries.

Ledinghem (French pronunciation: [lədɛ̃ɡɑ̃]; Picard: Ledinghin; West Flemish: Ledingem) is a commune in the Pas-de-Calais department in the Hauts-de-France region of France 12 miles (19 km) southwest of Saint-Omer.

== Population ==
Historical population
Year	Pop.	±% p.a.
1968	230	—
1975	227	−0.19%
1982	202	−1.65%
1990	208	+0.37%
1999	207	−0.05%
2007	250	+2.39%
2012	327	+5.52%
2017	338	+0.66%
2023	316	−1.12%
Source: INSEE

== See also ==
- Communes of the Pas-de-Calais department
