= Escœuilles =

Escœuilles Skole
- Commune
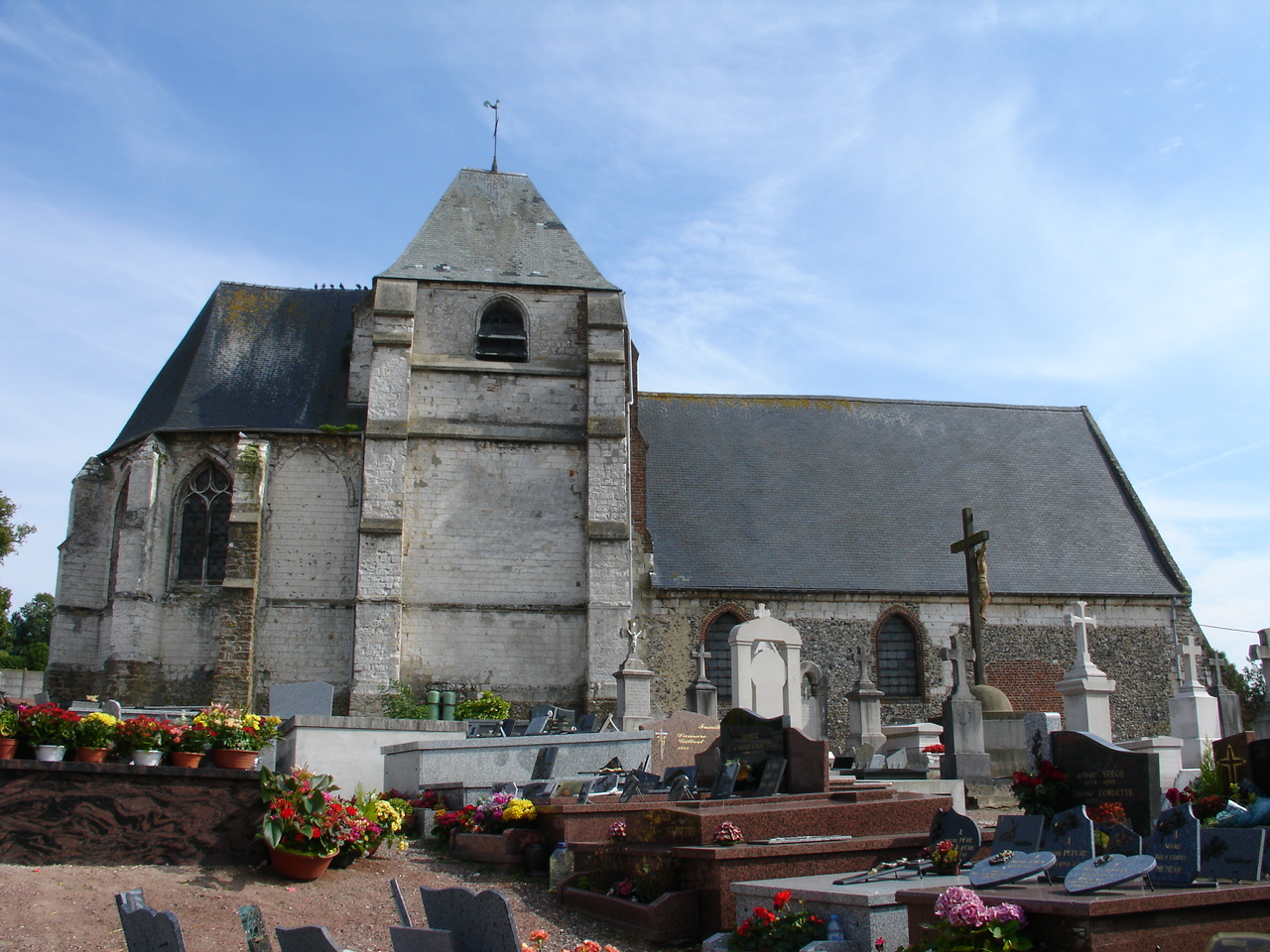
- The church in Escœuilles

- Coat of arms
- Location of Escœuilles
- Location within France Location within Hauts-de-France
- Coordinates: 50°43′35″N 1°55′38″E
- Country: France
- Region: Hauts-de-France
- Department: Pas-de-Calais
- Arrondissement: Saint-Omer
- Canton: Lumbres
- Intercommunality: Pays de Lumbres

Government
  - Mayor (2020–2026): Christian Leroy
- Area^{1}: 5.91 km^{2} (2.28 sq mi)
- Elevation: 107 m (351 ft)
- Highest elevation: 211 m (692 ft)
- Lowest elevation: 93 m (305 ft)
- Population (2023): 461
  - Density: 78.0/km^{2} (202/sq mi)
- Time zone: UTC+01:00 (CET)
  - Summer (DST): UTC+02:00 (CEST)
- INSEE/Postal code: 62308 /62850
- ^{1} French Land Register data, which excludes lakes, ponds, glaciers > 1 km^{2} (0.386 sq mi or 247 acres) and river estuaries.

Escœuilles (French pronunciation: [ekœj]; West Flemish: Skole) is a commune in the Pas-de-Calais department in the Hauts-de-France region of France.

== Geography ==
A farming village situated 15 miles (24 km) west of Saint-Omer, at the junction of the N42 and D216 roads.

== Etymology ==
The village name first appears in 1084 as Seules. In the year 1200, it had the name Esquelles, then Eskelle, Scules, Escueles, Esquieulles, Ecueil, Escoueuille and finally Escoeuilles.

== Population ==
Historical population
Year	Pop.	±% p.a.
1968	328	—
1975	309	−0.85%
1982	296	−0.61%
1990	331	+1.41%
1999	398	+2.07%
2007	438	+1.20%
2012	464	+1.16%
2017	479	+0.64%
2023	461	−0.64%
Source: INSEE

== Transport ==
The Chemin de fer de Boulogne à Bonningues (CF de BB) opened a station at Escœuilles on 22 April 1900. Passenger services were withdrawn on 31 December 1935. They were reinstated in November 1942. The CF de BB closed in 1948.

== Places of interest ==
- The church of the Assumption, dating from the thirteenth century.
- The chapel, built in 1877.
- The war memorial.

== See also ==
- Communes of the Pas-de-Calais department
