= Esquerdes =

Esquerdes Zwerde
- Commune
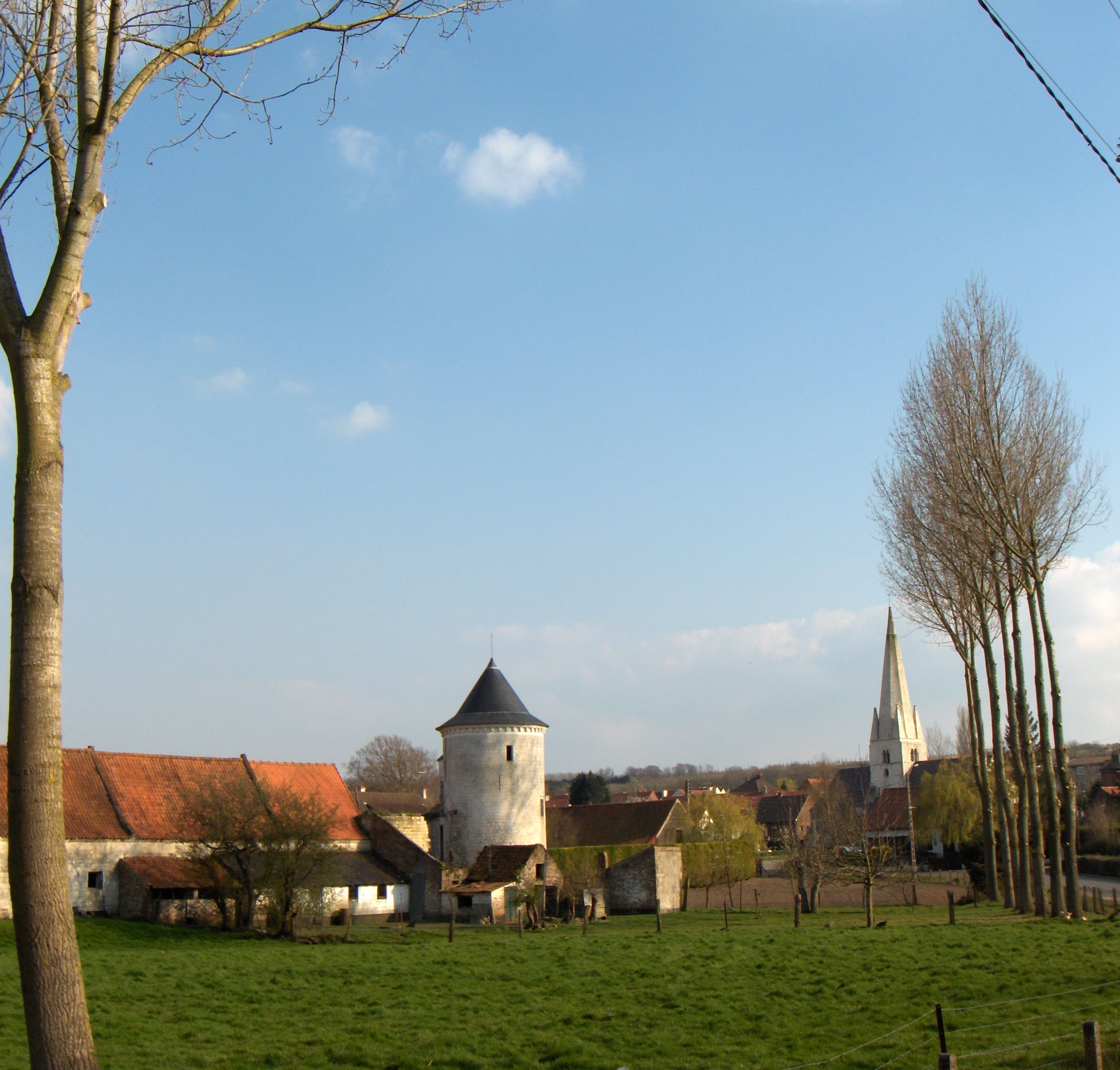
- The old fortified farmhouse in white limestone and the church

- Coat of arms
- Location of Esquerdes
- Location within France Location within Hauts-de-France
- Coordinates: 50°42′19″N 2°11′18″E
- Country: France
- Region: Hauts-de-France
- Department: Pas-de-Calais
- Arrondissement: Saint-Omer
- Canton: Lumbres
- Intercommunality: Pays de Lumbres

Government
  - Mayor (2020–2026): Olivier Obert
- Area^{1}: 9.4 km^{2} (3.6 sq mi)
- Elevation: 45 m (148 ft)
- Highest elevation: 139 m (456 ft)
- Lowest elevation: 25 m (82 ft)
- Population (2023): 1,594
  - Density: 170/km^{2} (440/sq mi)
- Time zone: UTC+01:00 (CET)
  - Summer (DST): UTC+02:00 (CEST)
- INSEE/Postal code: 62309 /62380
- ^{1} French Land Register data, which excludes lakes, ponds, glaciers > 1 km^{2} (0.386 sq mi or 247 acres) and river estuaries.

Esquerdes (French pronunciation: [ekɛʁd]; West Flemish: Zwerde) is a commune in the Pas-de-Calais department in the Hauts-de-France region of France 4 miles (6 km) southwest of Saint-Omer.

== Etymology ==
The village name first appears as Squerda in the year 857. Later known as Ekarde and finally as Esquerdes.

== History ==
An ancient village, Esquerdes was on the Roman road, the Leulène, that ran from Thérouanne to Sangatte on the coast. An archaeological survey of 1984 revealed traces of the Neolithic period (flint and carved bone) at two sites known as Les Tripoux and Le Paradis.
The private Crèvecoeur farm, near the river, is made up of a number of buildings dating from the fifteenth century that belonged to John de Trémoillepuis and his son, Philippe de Crèvecoeur, who served under Charles the Bold, Duke of Burgundy and Kings Louis XI and Charles VII. He was appointed Marshal of France in 1483 and changed his surname to that of Esquerdes.
The story of Esquerdes is linked to the development of two major industries of paper and gunpowder, which developed from the time of Louis XIV until the 19th century and which led to a large growth in population. In 1790, the town was large enough (with its 500 inhabitants) to be appointed chief town of the canton. Two hundred years or so later, this figure has more than tripled.

== Population ==
Historical population
Year	Pop.	±% p.a.
1968	1,205	—
1975	1,182	−0.27%
1982	1,278	+1.12%
1990	1,530	+2.28%
1999	1,460	−0.52%
2007	1,584	+1.02%
2012	1,549	−0.45%
2017	1,629	+1.01%
2023	1,594	−0.36%
Source: INSEE

== Notable people ==
- Philippe de Crèvecœur d'Esquerdes (1418–1494), Marshal of France in 1486 and seigneur of the village.

== See also ==
- Communes of the Pas-de-Calais department
