= Acquin-Westbécourt =

- Commune
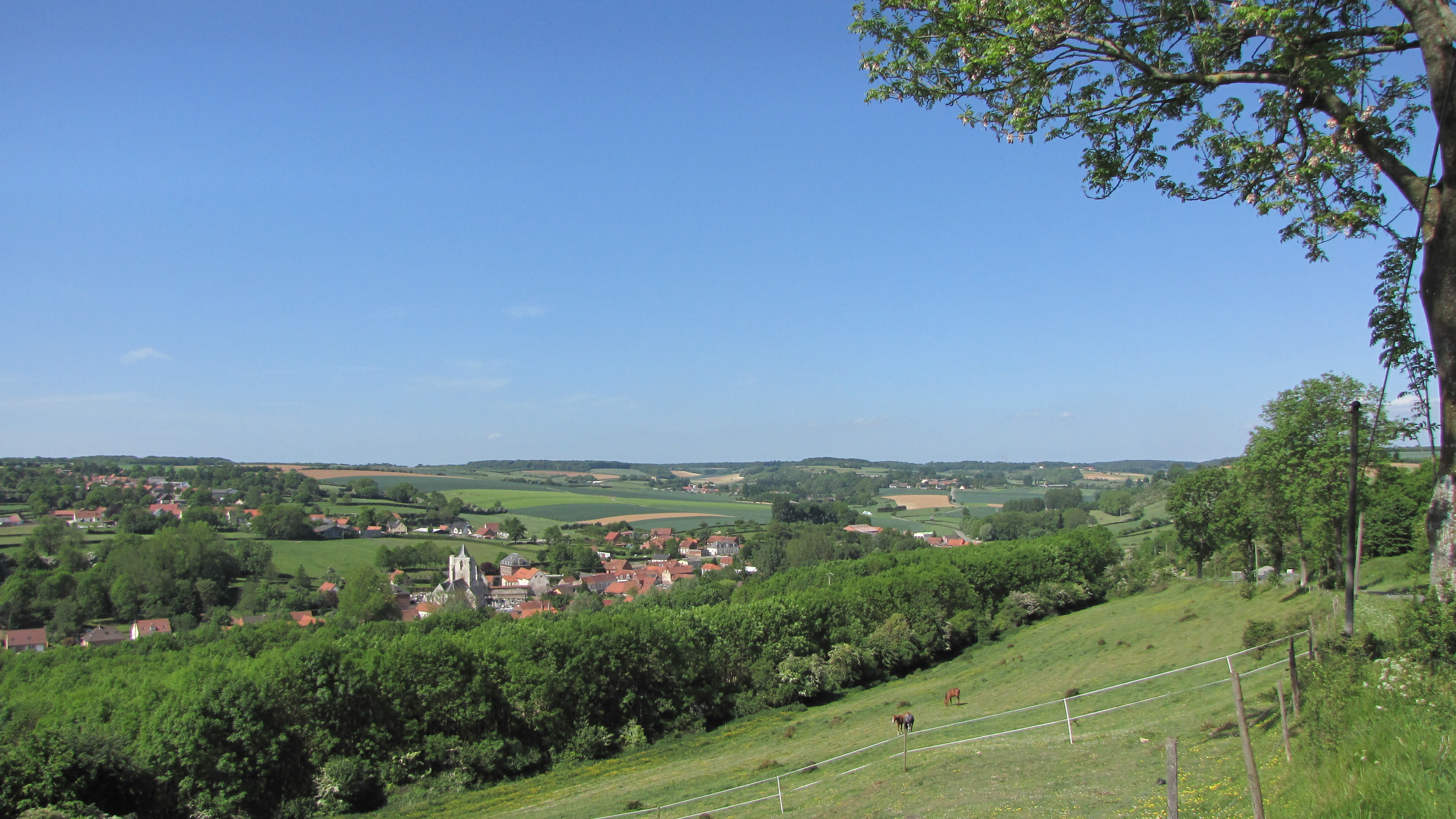
- A general view of Acquin-Westbécourt

- Coat of arms
- Location of Acquin-Westbécourt
- Location within France Location within Hauts-de-France
- Coordinates: 50°43′41″N 2°05′24″E
- Country: France
- Region: Hauts-de-France
- Department: Pas-de-Calais
- Arrondissement: Saint-Omer
- Canton: Lumbres
- Intercommunality: Pays de Lumbres

Government
  - Mayor (2020–2026): Mathieu Pruvost
- Area^{1}: 14.29 km^{2} (5.52 sq mi)
- Elevation: 80 m (260 ft)
- Highest elevation: 178 m (584 ft)
- Lowest elevation: 60 m (200 ft)
- Population (2023): 802
  - Density: 56.1/km^{2} (145/sq mi)
- Time zone: UTC+01:00 (CET)
  - Summer (DST): UTC+02:00 (CEST)
- INSEE/Postal code: 62008 /62380
- ^{1} French Land Register data, which excludes lakes, ponds, glaciers > 1 km^{2} (0.386 sq mi or 247 acres) and river estuaries.

Acquin-Westbécourt (French pronunciation: [akɛ̃ wɛstbekuʁ]; Picard: Acuin-Boucourt) is a commune in the Pas-de-Calais department in northern France.

== Geography ==
A village, located 9 miles (15 km) west of Saint-Omer, at the D225 and D208 crossroads. Seven hamlets are found within the commune: Le val d'Acquin, Lauwerdal, Nordal, Le Poovre, Westbécourt, Merzoil et and La Wattine. A large national nature reserve has been created in the area, of great ecological interest.

== History ==
First mentioned by the name of "Atcona" in the 10th century. Acquin and Westbécourt were joined as a single commune on 1 January 1974.

== Population ==
Historical population
Year	Pop.	±% p.a.
1968	639	—
1975	571	−1.59%
1982	559	−0.30%
1990	617	+1.24%
1999	625	+0.14%
2007	665	+0.78%
2012	713	+1.40%
2017	833	+3.16%
2023	802	−0.63%
Source: INSEE

== Sights ==
- The church of St.Pétronille, dating from the sixteenth century.
- The church of St. Eloi at Westbécourt, dating from the Middle Ages.

== Transport ==
The Chemin de fer d'Anvin à Calais opened a railway station at Acquin in 1881. The railway was closed in 1955.

== See also ==
Communes of the Pas-de-Calais department
