= Saint-Michel-sous-Bois =

- Commune
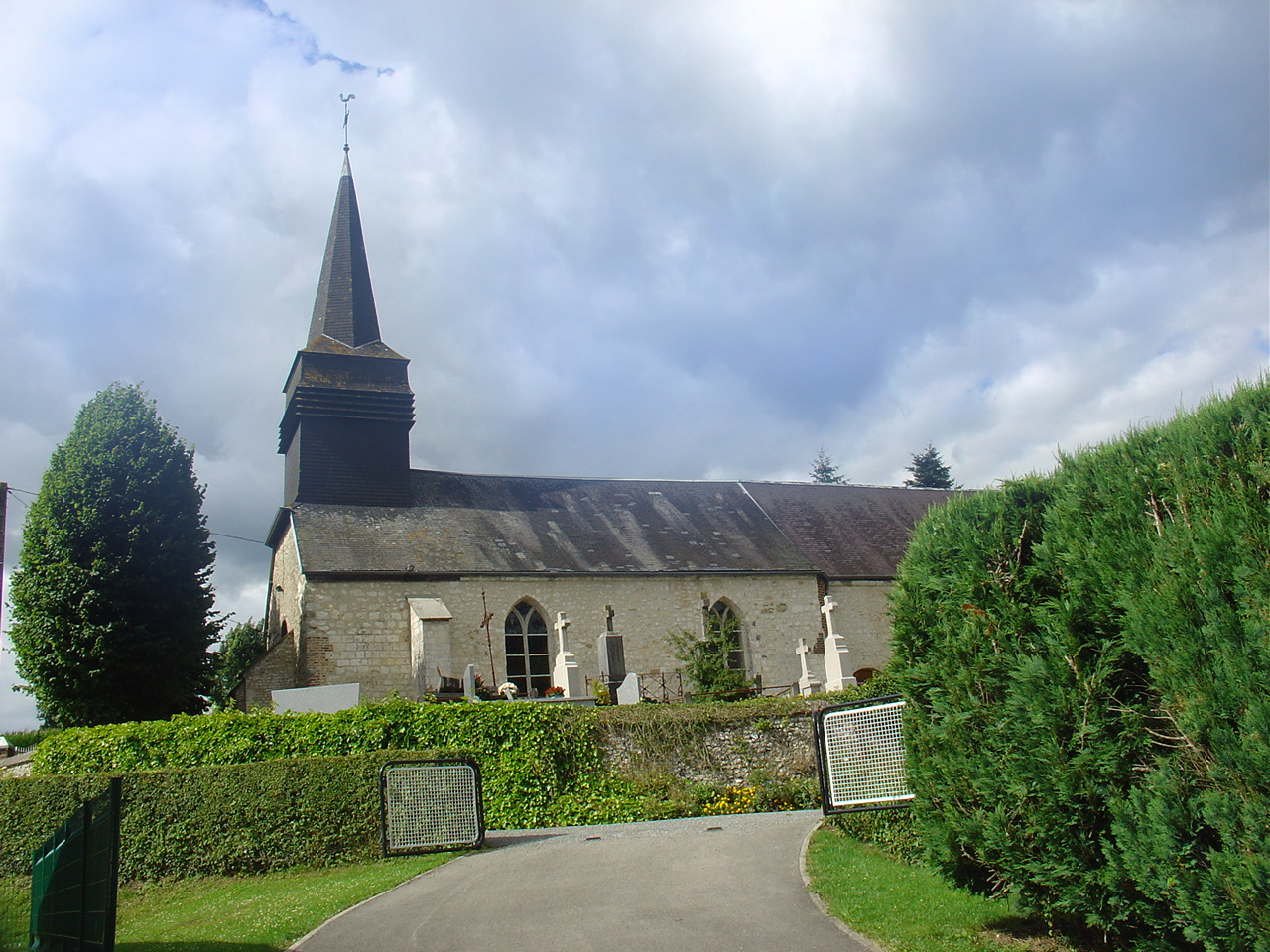
- The church of Saint-Michel-sous-Bois

- Coat of arms
- Location of Saint-Michel-sous-Bois
- Location within France Location within Hauts-de-France
- Coordinates: 50°30′52″N 1°55′57″E
- Country: France
- Region: Hauts-de-France
- Department: Pas-de-Calais
- Arrondissement: Montreuil
- Canton: Lumbres
- Intercommunality: CC Haut Pays du Montreuillois

Government
  - Mayor (2020–2026): René Lecerf
- Area^{1}: 5.66 km^{2} (2.19 sq mi)
- Elevation: 94 m (308 ft)
- Highest elevation: 190 m (620 ft)
- Lowest elevation: 68 m (223 ft)
- Population (2023): 131
  - Density: 23.1/km^{2} (59.9/sq mi)
- Time zone: UTC+01:00 (CET)
  - Summer (DST): UTC+02:00 (CEST)
- INSEE/Postal code: 62762 /62650
- ^{1} French Land Register data, which excludes lakes, ponds, glaciers > 1 km^{2} (0.386 sq mi or 247 acres) and river estuaries.

Saint-Michel-sous-Bois (French pronunciation: [sɛ̃ miʃɛl su bwa]) is a commune in the Pas-de-Calais department in the Hauts-de-France region of France.

== Geography ==
Saint-Michel-sous-Bois is located 9 miles (15.5 km) northeast of Montreuil-sur-Mer on the D129 road.

== Population ==
Historical population
Year	Pop.	±% p.a.
1968	124	—
1975	122	−0.23%
1982	125	+0.35%
1990	106	−2.04%
1999	89	−1.92%
2007	110	+2.68%
2012	122	+2.09%
2017	119	−0.50%
2023	131	+1.61%
Source: INSEE

== Places of interest ==
- The church of St. Michel, dating from the seventeenth century

== See also ==
Communes of the Pas-de-Calais department
