= Pihem =

- Commune
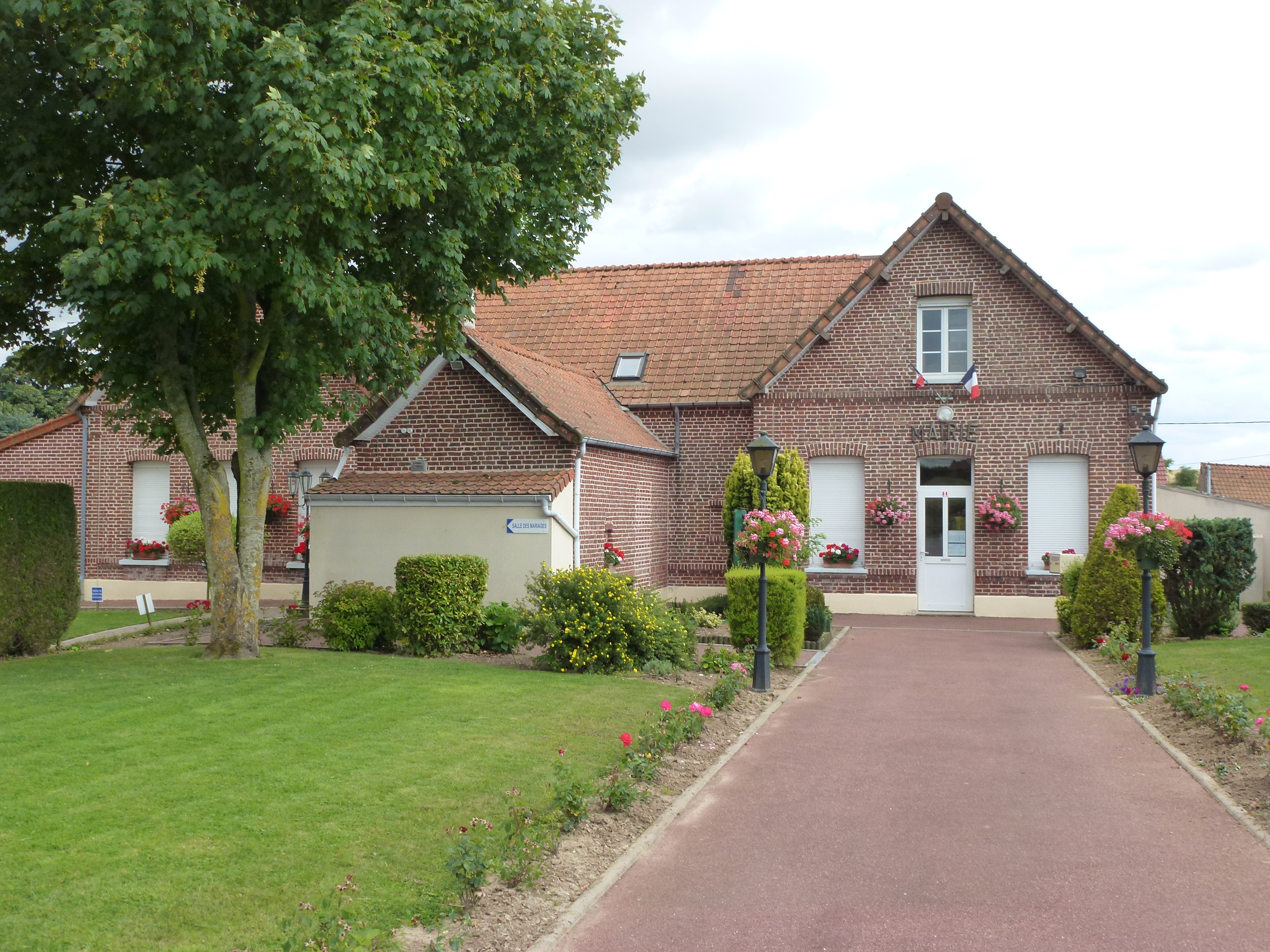
- The town hall of Pihem

- Coat of arms
- Location of Pihem
- Location within France Location within Hauts-de-France
- Coordinates: 50°41′02″N 2°12′50″E
- Country: France
- Region: Hauts-de-France
- Department: Pas-de-Calais
- Arrondissement: Saint-Omer
- Canton: Lumbres
- Intercommunality: Pays de Lumbres

Government
  - Mayor (2020–2026): Jean-Claude Coyot
- Area^{1}: 7.13 km^{2} (2.75 sq mi)
- Elevation: 51 m (167 ft)
- Highest elevation: 134 m (440 ft)
- Lowest elevation: 70 m (230 ft)
- Population (2023): 919
  - Density: 129/km^{2} (334/sq mi)
- Time zone: UTC+01:00 (CET)
  - Summer (DST): UTC+02:00 (CEST)
- INSEE/Postal code: 62656 /62570
- ^{1} French Land Register data, which excludes lakes, ponds, glaciers > 1 km^{2} (0.386 sq mi or 247 acres) and river estuaries.

Pihem (French pronunciation: [pi.ɑ̃]) is a commune in the Pas-de-Calais department in the Hauts-de-France region of France about 5 miles (8 km) south of Saint-Omer.

== Population ==
Historical population
Year	Pop.	±% p.a.
1968	532	—
1975	515	−0.46%
1982	616	+2.59%
1990	802	+3.35%
1999	893	+1.20%
2007	948	+0.75%
2012	996	+0.99%
2017	948	−0.98%
2023	919	−0.52%
Source: INSEE

== See also ==
- Communes of the Pas-de-Calais department
