= Vaudringhem =

Vaudringhem Woudringem
- Commune
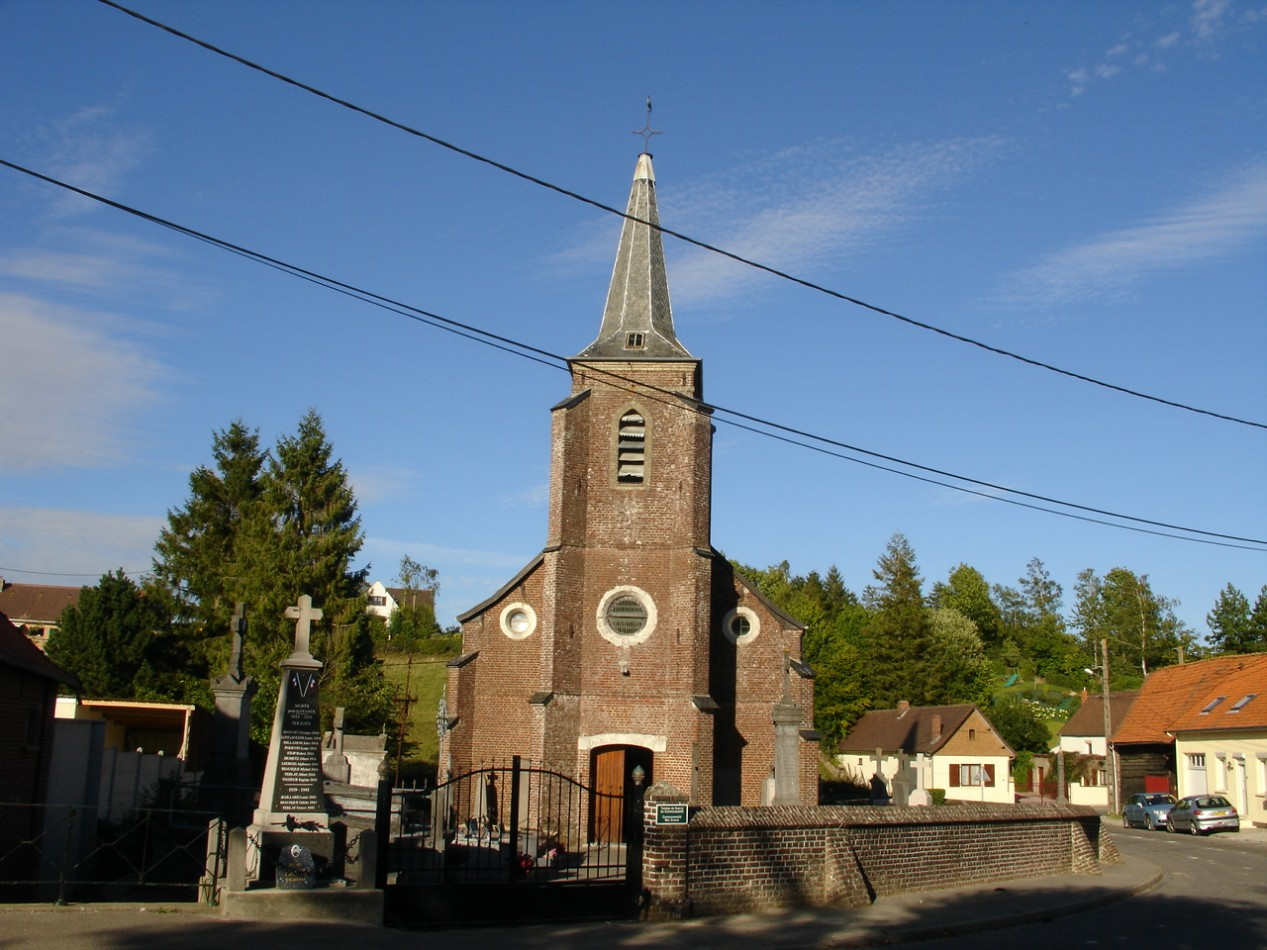
- The church of Vaudringhem

- Coat of arms
- Location of Vaudringhem
- Location within France Location within Hauts-de-France
- Coordinates: 50°39′45″N 2°01′45″E
- Country: France
- Region: Hauts-de-France
- Department: Pas-de-Calais
- Arrondissement: Saint-Omer
- Canton: Lumbres
- Intercommunality: Pays de Lumbres

Government
  - Mayor (2020–2026): Olivier Merlo
- Area^{1}: 7.61 km^{2} (2.94 sq mi)
- Elevation: 150 m (490 ft)
- Highest elevation: 200 m (660 ft)
- Lowest elevation: 94 m (308 ft)
- Population (2023): 494
  - Density: 64.9/km^{2} (168/sq mi)
- Time zone: UTC+01:00 (CET)
  - Summer (DST): UTC+02:00 (CEST)
- INSEE/Postal code: 62837 /62380
- ^{1} French Land Register data, which excludes lakes, ponds, glaciers > 1 km^{2} (0.386 sq mi or 247 acres) and river estuaries.

Vaudringhem (Picard: Vaudringhin; West Flemish: Woudringem) is a commune in the Pas-de-Calais department in the Hauts-de-France region of France.

== Geography ==
Vaudringhem is located 14 miles (23 km) southwest of Saint-Omer, on the D203 road.

== Population ==
Historical population
| Year | Pop. | ±% p.a. |
|---|---|---|
| 1968 | 377 | — |
| 1975 | 390 | +0.49% |
| 1982 | 404 | +0.51% |
| 1990 | 391 | −0.41% |
| 1999 | 372 | −0.55% |
| 2007 | 457 | +2.61% |
| 2012 | 503 | +1.94% |
| 2017 | 532 | +1.13% |
| 2023 | 494 | −1.23% |
Source: INSEE

== Places of interest ==
- The church of Saint Leger, dating from the eighteenth century.

== See also ==
- Communes of the Pas-de-Calais department
