= Clerques =

Clerques Klarke
- Commune
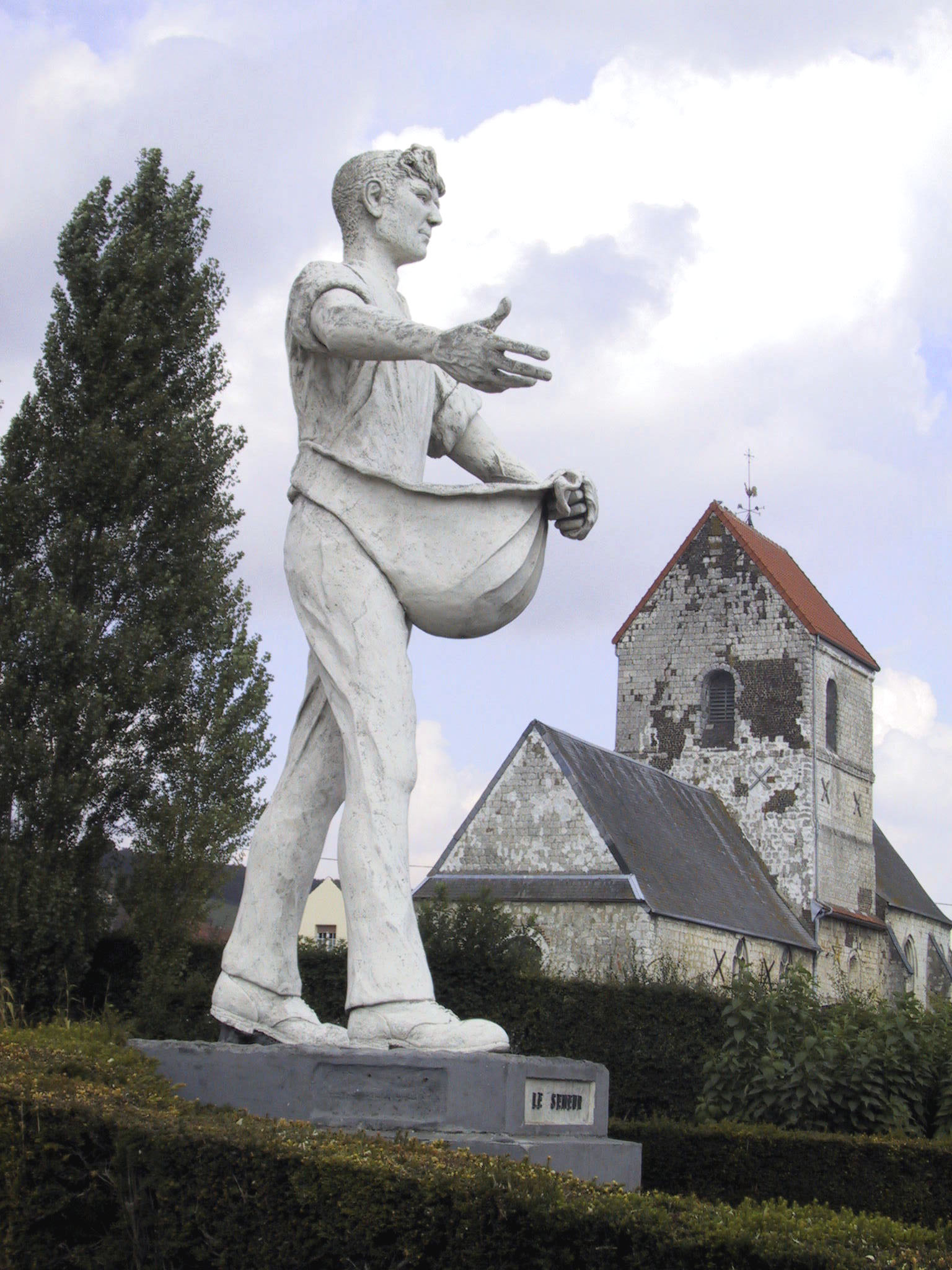
- The Sower and Saint-Barthélémy's church

- Coat of arms
- Location of Clerques
- Location within France Location within Hauts-de-France
- Coordinates: 50°47′37″N 1°59′43″E
- Country: France
- Region: Hauts-de-France
- Department: Pas-de-Calais
- Arrondissement: Saint-Omer
- Canton: Lumbres
- Intercommunality: Pays de Lumbres

Government
  - Mayor (2020–2026): Aurélien Dommanget
- Area^{1}: 6.39 km^{2} (2.47 sq mi)
- Elevation: 47 m (154 ft)
- Highest elevation: 173 m (568 ft)
- Lowest elevation: 37 m (121 ft)
- Population (2023): 312
  - Density: 48.8/km^{2} (126/sq mi)
- Time zone: UTC+01:00 (CET)
  - Summer (DST): UTC+02:00 (CEST)
- INSEE/Postal code: 62228 /62890
- ^{1} French Land Register data, which excludes lakes, ponds, glaciers > 1 km^{2} (0.386 sq mi or 247 acres) and river estuaries.

Clerques (French pronunciation: [klɛʁk]; West Flemish: Klarke) is a commune in the Pas-de-Calais department in the Hauts-de-France region of France 10 miles (16 km) northwest of Saint-Omer, in the valley of the river Hem at the foot of the Boulonnais, which is a wooded ridge there. Two hamlets, Audenfort to the west and Le Hamel to the east, make up the remainder of the commune.

== Population ==
Historical population
| Year | Pop. | ±% p.a. |
|---|---|---|
| 1968 | 186 | — |
| 1975 | 180 | −0.47% |
| 1982 | 209 | +2.16% |
| 1990 | 215 | +0.35% |
| 1999 | 213 | −0.10% |
| 2007 | 249 | +1.97% |
| 2012 | 285 | +2.74% |
| 2017 | 327 | +2.79% |
| 2023 | 312 | −0.78% |
Source: INSEE

== History ==
On 13 August 2006 the stone bridge in the village centre, built in 1862, was destroyed after exceptional rainfall upstream at Licques.

== Transport ==
The Chemin de fer de Boulogne à Bonningues (CF de BB) opened a station at Audenfort, near Clerques, on 22 April 1900. Passenger services were withdrawn on 31 December 1935. They were reinstated in November 1942. The CF de BB closed in 1948.

== See also ==
- Communes of the Pas-de-Calais department
