= Coulomby =

- Commune
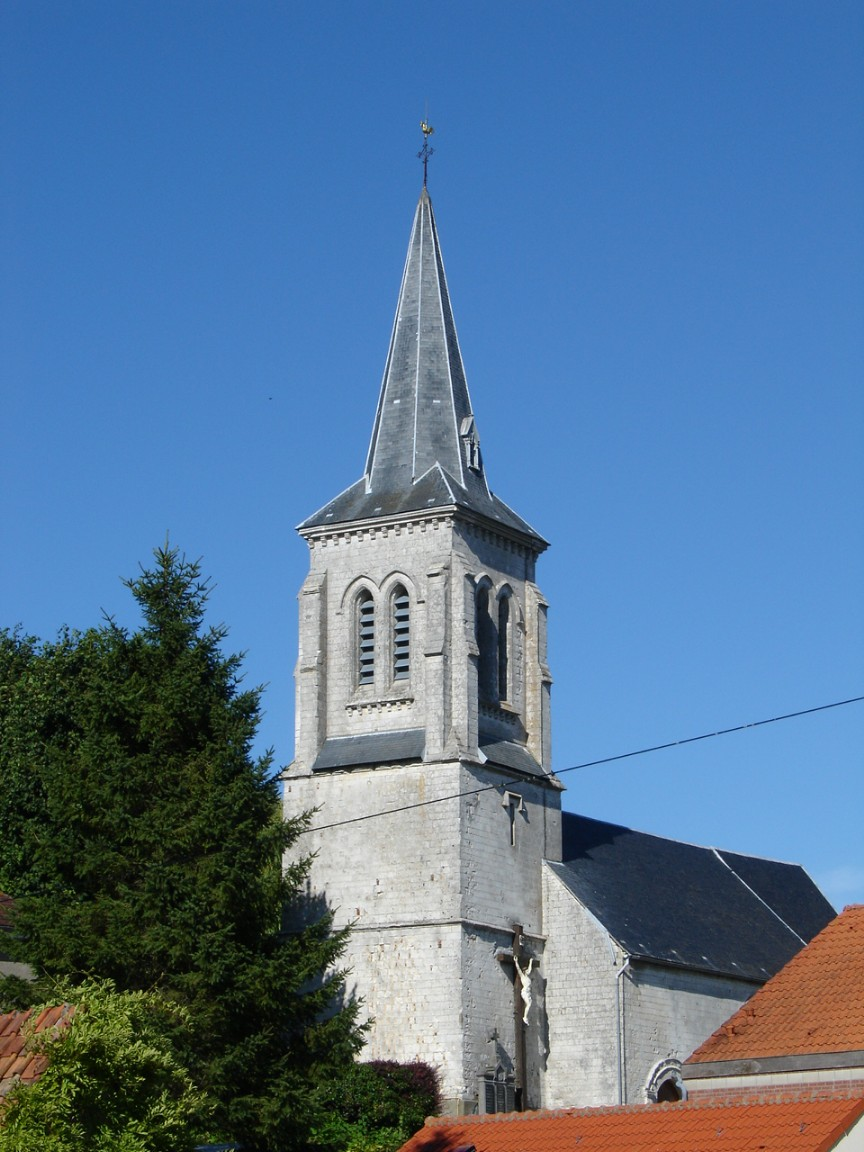
- The church of Coulomby

- Coat of arms
- Location of Coulomby
- Location within France Location within Hauts-de-France
- Coordinates: 50°42′23″N 2°00′42″E
- Country: France
- Region: Hauts-de-France
- Department: Pas-de-Calais
- Arrondissement: Saint-Omer
- Canton: Lumbres
- Intercommunality: Pays de Lumbres

Government
  - Mayor (2020–2026): Laurent Pourchel
- Area^{1}: 10.26 km^{2} (3.96 sq mi)
- Elevation: 124 m (407 ft)
- Highest elevation: 211 m (692 ft)
- Lowest elevation: 98 m (322 ft)
- Population (2023): 770
  - Density: 75/km^{2} (190/sq mi)
- Time zone: UTC+01:00 (CET)
  - Summer (DST): UTC+02:00 (CEST)
- INSEE/Postal code: 62245 /62380
- ^{1} French Land Register data, which excludes lakes, ponds, glaciers > 1 km^{2} (0.386 sq mi or 247 acres) and river estuaries.

Coulomby (French pronunciation: [kulɔ̃bi]) is a commune in the Pas-de-Calais department in the Hauts-de-France region of France 10 miles (16 km) west of Saint-Omer.

== Population ==
Historical population
Year	Pop.	±% p.a.
1968	425	—
1975	393	−1.11%
1982	397	+0.14%
1990	435	+1.15%
1999	404	−0.82%
2007	626	+5.63%
2012	700	+2.26%
2017	737	+1.04%
2023	770	+0.73%
Source: INSEE

== See also ==
- Communes of the Pas-de-Calais department
