= Bayenghem-lès-Seninghem =

Bayenghem-lès-Seninghem Baaiengem
- Commune
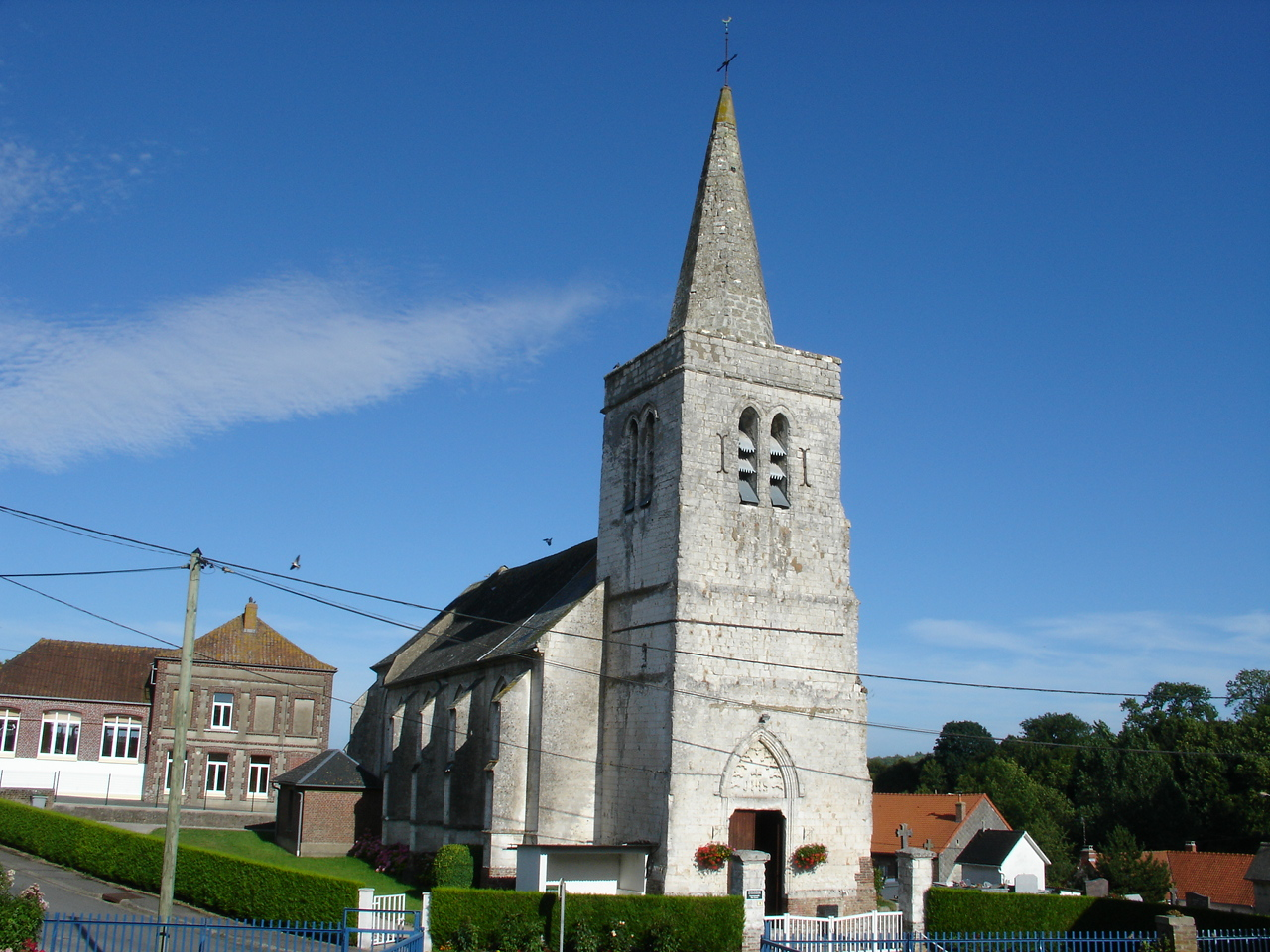
- The church of Bayenghem-lès-Seninghem

- Coat of arms
- Location of Bayenghem-lès-Seninghem
- Location within France Location within Hauts-de-France
- Coordinates: 50°42′03″N 2°04′39″E
- Country: France
- Region: Hauts-de-France
- Department: Pas-de-Calais
- Arrondissement: Saint-Omer
- Canton: Lumbres
- Intercommunality: Pays de Lumbres

Government
  - Mayor (2020–2026): Jean-François Denecque
- Area^{1}: 3.33 km^{2} (1.29 sq mi)
- Elevation: 64 m (210 ft)
- Highest elevation: 170 m (560 ft)
- Lowest elevation: 50 m (160 ft)
- Population (2023): 354
  - Density: 106/km^{2} (275/sq mi)
- Time zone: UTC+01:00 (CET)
  - Summer (DST): UTC+02:00 (CEST)
- INSEE/Postal code: 62088 /62380
- ^{1} French Land Register data, which excludes lakes, ponds, glaciers > 1 km^{2} (0.386 sq mi or 247 acres) and river estuaries.

Bayenghem-lès-Seninghem (French pronunciation: [bajɑ̃ɡɑ̃ lɛ sənɛ̃ɡɑ̃], literally Bayenghem near Seninghem; West Flemish: Baaiengem) is a commune in the Pas-de-Calais department in the Hauts-de-France region in northern France.

== Geography ==
A village located 10 miles (16 km) southwest of Saint-Omer, on the D204 road, just off the N42.

== Population ==
Historical population
Year	Pop.	±% p.a.
1968	192	—
1975	203	+0.80%
1982	235	+2.11%
1990	294	+2.84%
1999	304	+0.37%
2007	332	+1.11%
2012	329	−0.18%
2017	324	−0.31%
2023	354	+1.49%
Source: INSEE

== Sights ==
- St. Martin's sixteenth-century church.

== See also ==
- Communes of the Pas-de-Calais department
