= Humbert, Pas-de-Calais =

Humbert Humberg
- Commune
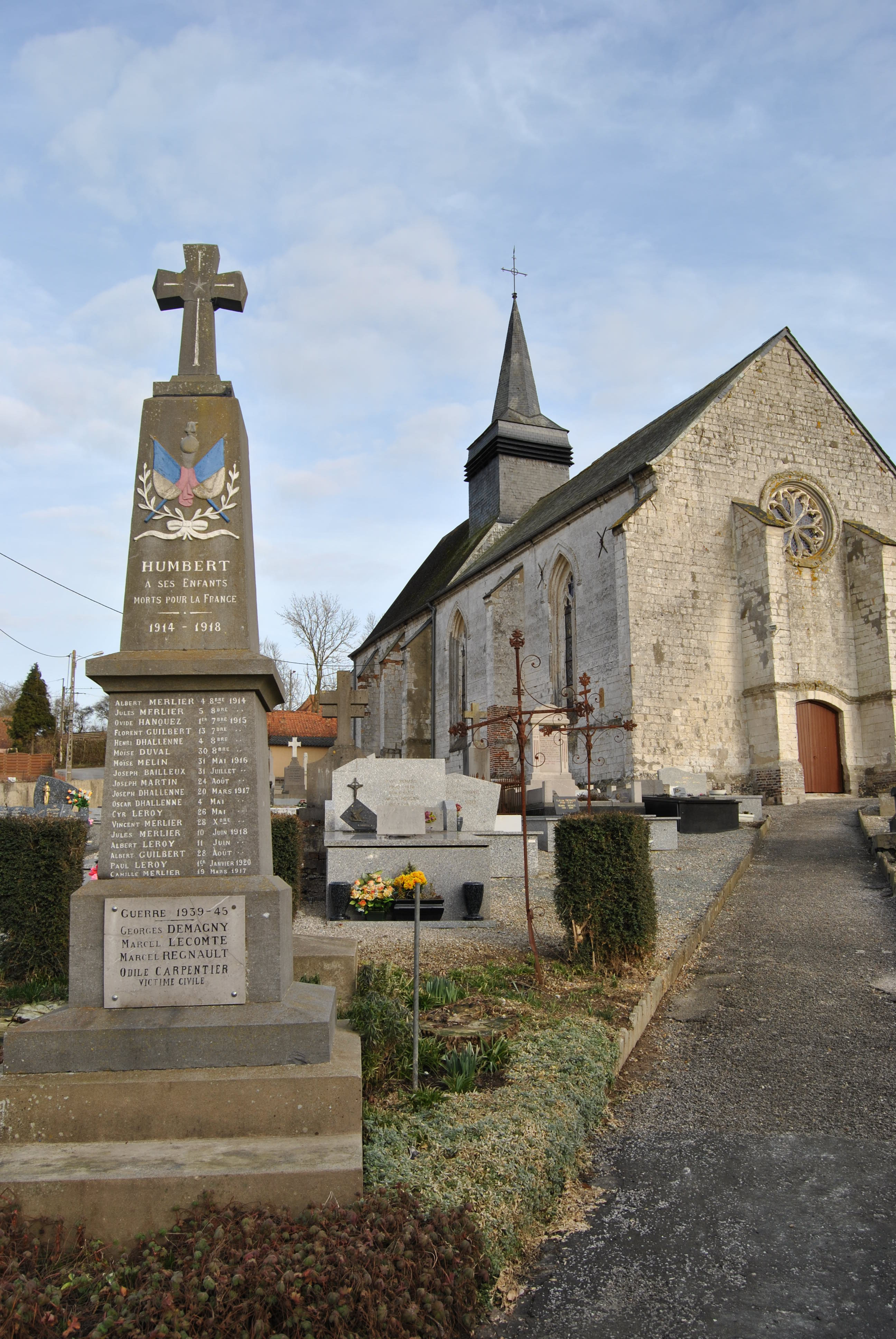
- The monument to the dead and church of Humbert

- Coat of arms
- Location of Humbert
- Location within France Location within Hauts-de-France
- Coordinates: 50°30′19″N 1°54′28″E
- Country: France
- Region: Hauts-de-France
- Department: Pas-de-Calais
- Arrondissement: Montreuil
- Canton: Lumbres
- Intercommunality: CC Haut Pays du Montreuillois

Government
  - Mayor (2020–2026): Jean-Claude Avisse
- Area^{1}: 7.85 km^{2} (3.03 sq mi)
- Elevation: 57 m (187 ft)
- Highest elevation: 147 m (482 ft)
- Lowest elevation: 47 m (154 ft)
- Population (2023): 249
  - Density: 31.7/km^{2} (82.2/sq mi)
- Time zone: UTC+01:00 (CET)
  - Summer (DST): UTC+02:00 (CEST)
- INSEE/Postal code: 62466 /62650
- ^{1} French Land Register data, which excludes lakes, ponds, glaciers > 1 km^{2} (0.386 sq mi or 247 acres) and river estuaries.

Humbert (French pronunciation: [œ̃bɛʁ]; West Flemish: Humberg) is a commune in the Pas-de-Calais department in the Hauts-de-France region of France.

== Geography ==
Situated some 8 miles (12 km) northeast of Montreuil-sur-Mer on the D129 road.

== Population ==
Historical population
Year	Pop.	±% p.a.
1968	238	—
1975	225	−0.80%
1982	196	−1.95%
1990	248	+2.99%
1999	254	+0.27%
2007	251	−0.15%
2012	232	−1.56%
2017	232	+0.00%
2023	249	+1.19%
Source: INSEE

== Places of interest ==
- The church of St.Peter, dating from the sixteenth century.

== See also ==
- Communes of the Pas-de-Calais department
