= Elnes, Pas-de-Calais =

Elnes Elne
- Commune
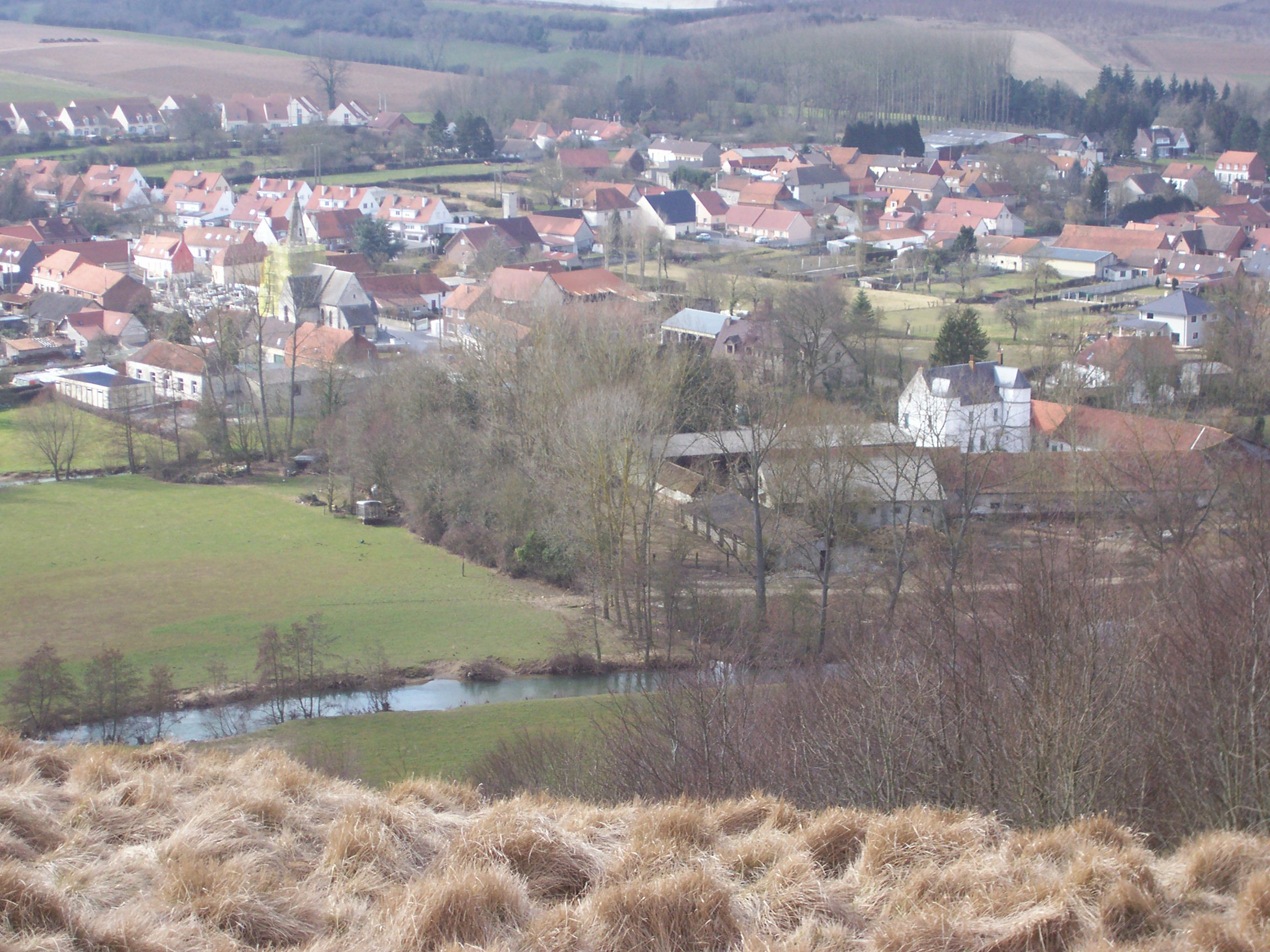
- A general view of Elnes

- Coat of arms
- Location of Elnes
- Location within France Location within Hauts-de-France
- Coordinates: 50°41′27″N 2°07′37″E
- Country: France
- Region: Hauts-de-France
- Department: Pas-de-Calais
- Arrondissement: Saint-Omer
- Canton: Lumbres
- Intercommunality: Pays de Lumbres

Government
  - Mayor (2020–2026): Jacques Delattre
- Area^{1}: 6.33 km^{2} (2.44 sq mi)
- Elevation: 52 m (171 ft)
- Highest elevation: 144 m (472 ft)
- Lowest elevation: 40 m (130 ft)
- Population (2023): 836
  - Density: 132/km^{2} (342/sq mi)
- Time zone: UTC+01:00 (CET)
  - Summer (DST): UTC+02:00 (CEST)
- INSEE/Postal code: 62292 /62380
- ^{1} French Land Register data, which excludes lakes, ponds, glaciers > 1 km^{2} (0.386 sq mi or 247 acres) and river estuaries.

Elnes (French pronunciation: [ɛln]; West Flemish: Elne) is a commune in the Pas-de-Calais department in the Hauts-de-France region of France.

== Geography ==
A farming village situated 9 miles (14 km) southwest of Saint-Omer, at the D225 and D132 crossroads.

== Population ==
Historical population
Year	Pop.	±% p.a.
1968	529	—
1975	666	+3.34%
1982	610	−1.25%
1990	692	+1.59%
1999	721	+0.46%
2007	826	+1.71%
2012	943	+2.68%
2017	914	−0.62%
2023	836	−1.48%
Source: INSEE

== Places of interest ==
- The church of St.Martin, dating from the sixteenth century.

== Economy ==
Elnes is primarily supported by small-scale enterprises, largely made up of the agricultural and service sectors. As of 2015, the commune hosted around 30 businesses.

== Transport ==
The Chemin de fer d'Anvin à Calais opened a railway station at Elnes in 1881. The railway was closed in 1955.

== See also ==
- Communes of the Pas-de-Calais department
