= Setques =

Setques Zetteke
- Commune
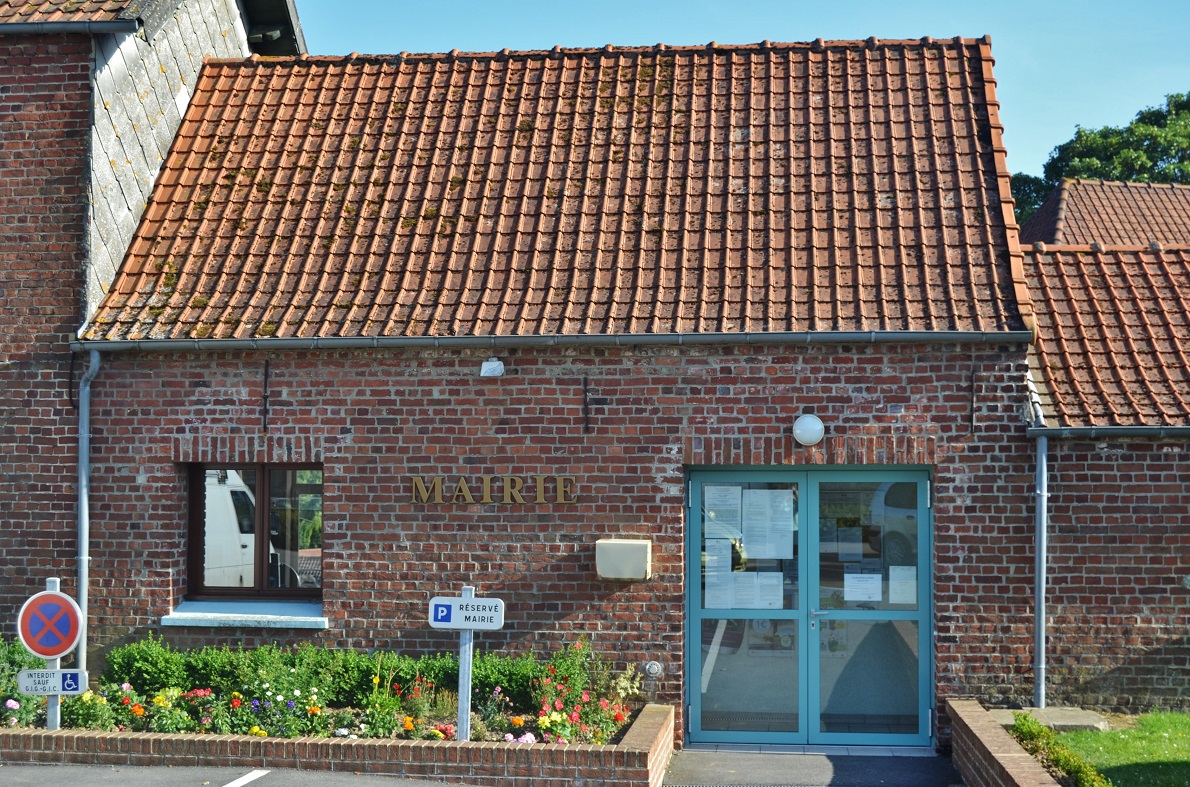
- The town hall of Setques

- Coat of arms
- Location of Setques
- Location within France Location within Hauts-de-France
- Coordinates: 50°42′45″N 2°09′34″E
- Country: France
- Region: Hauts-de-France
- Department: Pas-de-Calais
- Arrondissement: Saint-Omer
- Canton: Lumbres
- Intercommunality: Pays de Lumbres

Government
  - Mayor (2020–2026): Sylvain Lefebvre
- Area^{1}: 3.89 km^{2} (1.50 sq mi)
- Elevation: 55 m (180 ft)
- Highest elevation: 115 m (377 ft)
- Lowest elevation: 32 m (105 ft)
- Population (2023): 594
  - Density: 153/km^{2} (395/sq mi)
- Time zone: UTC+01:00 (CET)
  - Summer (DST): UTC+02:00 (CEST)
- INSEE/Postal code: 62794 /62380
- ^{1} French Land Register data, which excludes lakes, ponds, glaciers > 1 km^{2} (0.386 sq mi or 247 acres) and river estuaries.

Setques (French pronunciation: [sɛk]; West Flemish: Zetteke) is a commune in the Pas-de-Calais department in the Hauts-de-France region of France about 8 miles (13 km) southwest of Saint-Omer, in the valley of the Aa river.

== Population ==
Historical population
Year	Pop.	±% p.a.
1968	547	—
1975	502	−1.22%
1982	538	+0.99%
1990	627	+1.93%
1999	627	+0.00%
2007	631	+0.08%
2012	634	+0.09%
2017	608	−0.83%
2023	594	−0.39%
Source: INSEE

== See also ==
- Communes of the Pas-de-Calais department
