= Cléty =

- Commune
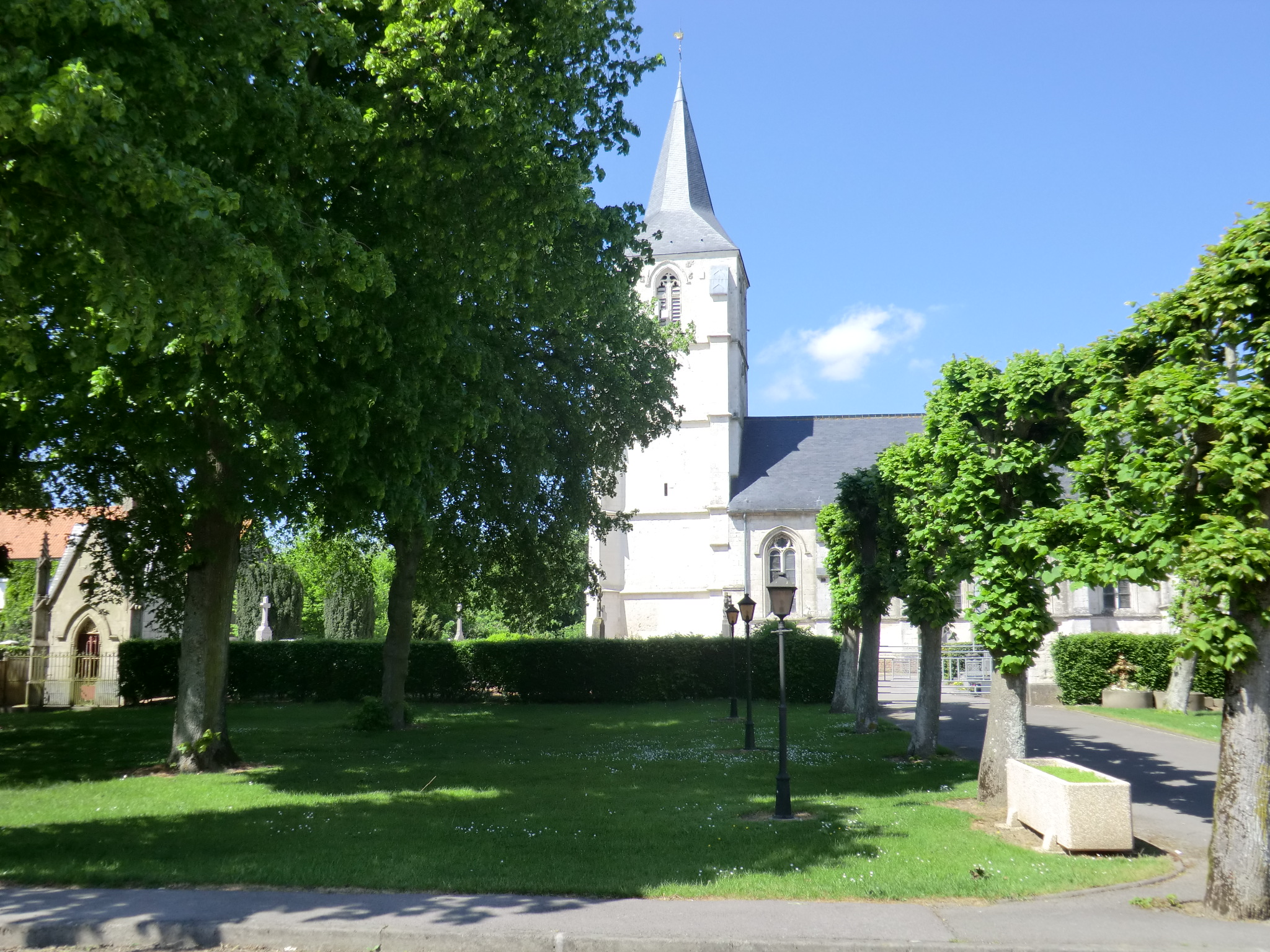
- The church of Cléty

- Coat of arms
- Location of Cléty
- Location within France Location within Hauts-de-France
- Coordinates: 50°39′09″N 2°10′57″E
- Country: France
- Region: Hauts-de-France
- Department: Pas-de-Calais
- Arrondissement: Saint-Omer
- Canton: Lumbres
- Intercommunality: Pays de Lumbres

Government
  - Mayor (2020–2026): Serge Lavogez
- Area^{1}: 6.13 km^{2} (2.37 sq mi)
- Elevation: 119 m (390 ft)
- Highest elevation: 123 m (404 ft)
- Lowest elevation: 70 m (230 ft)
- Population (2023): 805
  - Density: 131/km^{2} (340/sq mi)
- Time zone: UTC+01:00 (CET)
  - Summer (DST): UTC+02:00 (CEST)
- INSEE/Postal code: 62229 /62380
- ^{1} French Land Register data, which excludes lakes, ponds, glaciers > 1 km^{2} (0.386 sq mi or 247 acres) and river estuaries.

Cléty (French pronunciation: [kleti]; Picard: Kelty) is a commune in the Pas-de-Calais department in the Hauts-de-France region of France.

== Geography ==
Cléty is a small farming village situated 16 km (10 mi) south of Saint-Omer, at the D193 and D928 crossroads.

== Population ==
Historical population
Year	Pop.	±% p.a.
1968	328	—
1975	338	+0.43%
1982	374	+1.46%
1990	499	+3.67%
1999	511	+0.26%
2007	644	+2.93%
2012	697	+1.59%
2017	772	+2.07%
2023	805	+0.70%
Source: INSEE

== Places of interest ==
- The church of St. Leger, dating from the seventeenth century.

== See also ==
- Communes of the Pas-de-Calais department
