= Bouvelinghem =

Bouvelinghem Bovelingem
- Commune
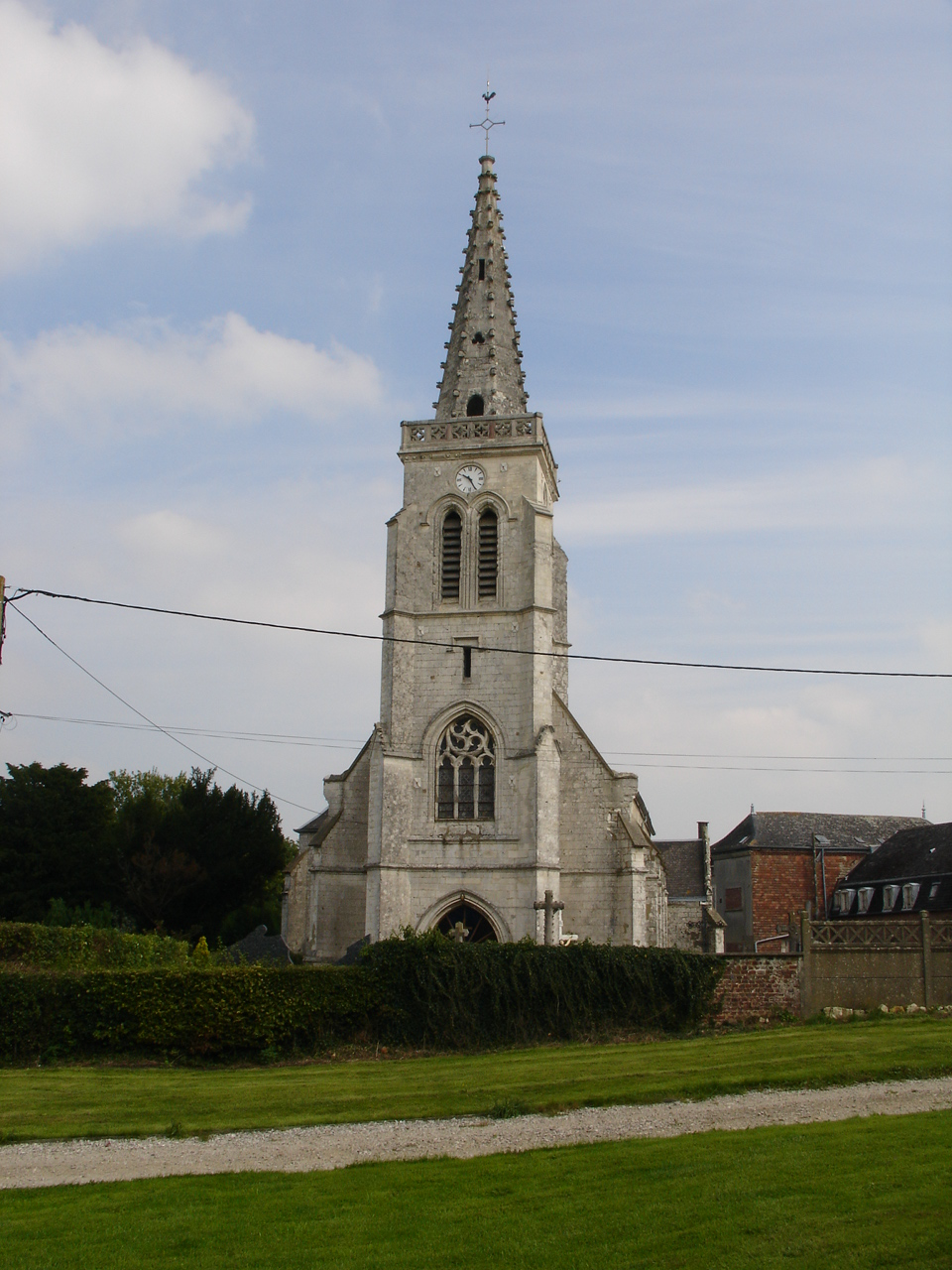
- The church of Bouvelinghem

- Coat of arms
- Location of Bouvelinghem
- Location within France Location within Hauts-de-France
- Coordinates: 50°44′03″N 2°01′58″E
- Country: France
- Region: Hauts-de-France
- Department: Pas-de-Calais
- Arrondissement: Saint-Omer
- Canton: Lumbres
- Intercommunality: Pays de Lumbres

Government
  - Mayor (2020–2026): Dominique Sénécat
- Area^{1}: 6.28 km^{2} (2.42 sq mi)
- Elevation: 175 m (574 ft)
- Highest elevation: 196 m (643 ft)
- Lowest elevation: 98 m (322 ft)
- Population (2023): 260
  - Density: 41/km^{2} (110/sq mi)
- Time zone: UTC+01:00 (CET)
  - Summer (DST): UTC+02:00 (CEST)
- INSEE/Postal code: 62169 /62380
- ^{1} French Land Register data, which excludes lakes, ponds, glaciers > 1 km^{2} (0.386 sq mi or 247 acres) and river estuaries.

Bouvelinghem (French pronunciation: [buvlɛ̃ɡɑ̃]; Picard: Bouvelinghin; West Flemish: Bovelingem) is a commune in the Pas-de-Calais department in the Hauts-de-France region in northern France.

== Geography ==
A village situated 10 miles (16 km) west of Saint-Omer, on the D208 road. It was completely destroyed by fire in 1876.

== Population ==
Historical population
Year	Pop.	±% p.a.
1968	155	—
1975	179	+2.08%
1982	158	−1.77%
1990	162	+0.31%
1999	142	−1.45%
2007	179	+2.94%
2012	242	+6.22%
2017	219	−1.98%
2023	260	+2.90%
Source: INSEE

== Sights ==
- The church of the Assumption, dating from the early 20th century.
- The ruins of a chateau.

== Transport ==
The Chemin de fer d'Anvin à Calais opened a railway station at Bouvelinghem in 1881. The railway was closed in 1955.

== See also ==
- Communes of the Pas-de-Calais department
