= Ouve-Wirquin =

Ouve-Wirquin Ouve-Werchin
- Commune
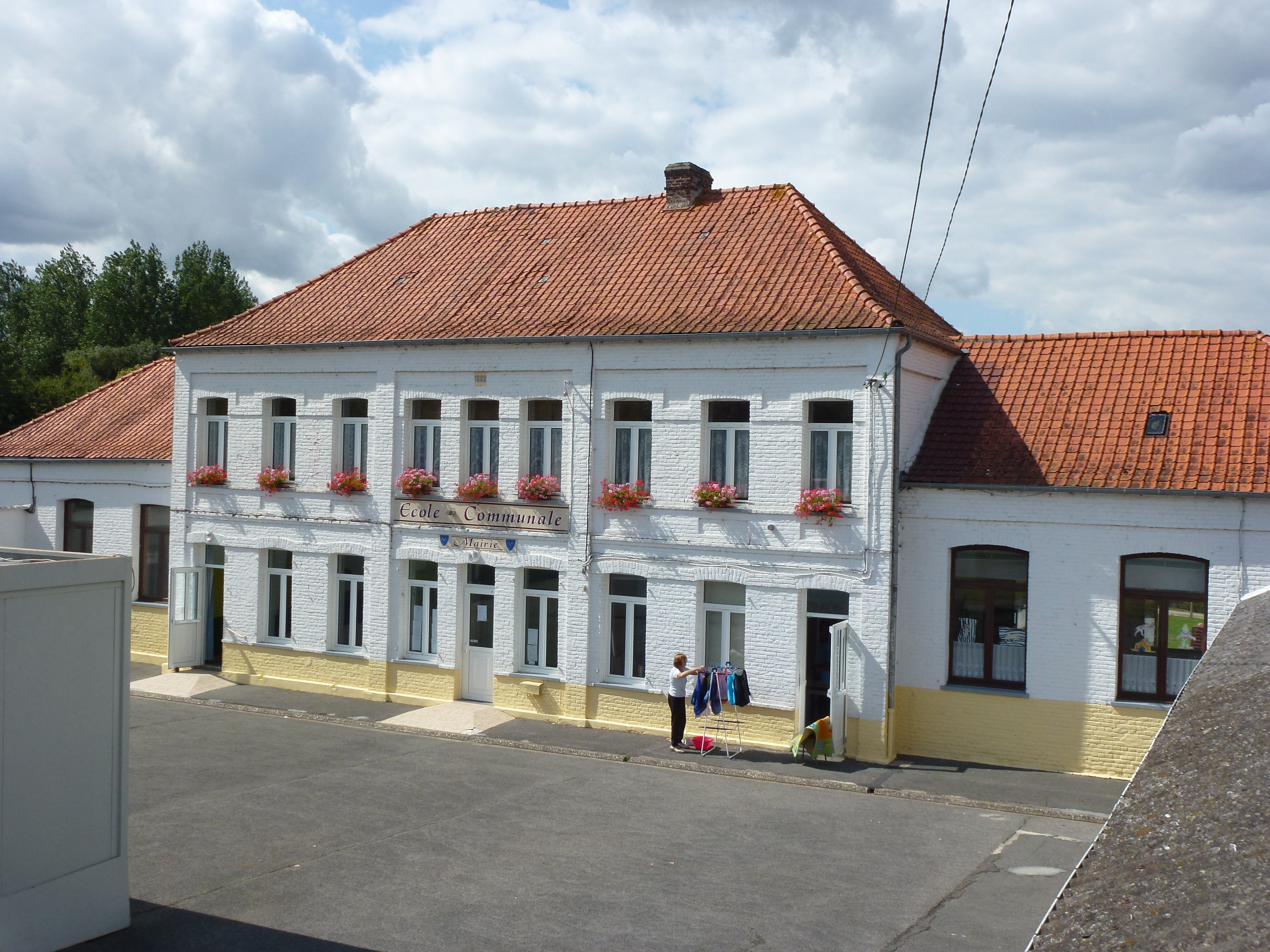
- The town hall and school of Ouve-Wirquin

- Coat of arms
- Location of Ouve-Wirquin
- Location within France Location within Hauts-de-France
- Coordinates: 50°39′05″N 2°08′44″E
- Country: France
- Region: Hauts-de-France
- Department: Pas-de-Calais
- Arrondissement: Saint-Omer
- Canton: Lumbres
- Intercommunality: Pays de Lumbres

Government
  - Mayor (2020–2026): Ghislain Wilquin
- Area^{1}: 5.25 km^{2} (2.03 sq mi)
- Elevation: 59 m (194 ft)
- Highest elevation: 137 m (449 ft)
- Lowest elevation: 52 m (171 ft)
- Population (2023): 493
  - Density: 93.9/km^{2} (243/sq mi)
- Time zone: UTC+01:00 (CET)
  - Summer (DST): UTC+02:00 (CEST)
- INSEE/Postal code: 62644 /62380
- ^{1} French Land Register data, which excludes lakes, ponds, glaciers > 1 km^{2} (0.386 sq mi or 247 acres) and river estuaries.

Ouve-Wirquin (French pronunciation: [uv viʁkɛ̃]; Picard: Houffe-Wirquin; West Flemish: Ouve-Werchin) is a commune in the Pas-de-Calais department in the Hauts-de-France region of France.

== Geography ==
Ouve-Wirquin lies about 10 miles (16 km) southwest of Saint-Omer, on the junction of the D225 and the D341, the route of the Roman road the Chausée Brunehaut. The river Aa flows through the commune.

== Population ==
Historical population
Year	Pop.	±% p.a.
1968	490	—
1975	478	−0.35%
1982	486	+0.24%
1990	486	+0.00%
1999	494	+0.18%
2007	536	+1.03%
2012	524	−0.45%
2017	506	−0.70%
2023	493	−0.43%
Source: INSEE

== Places of interest ==
- The church of Notre-Dame, dating from the nineteenth century.
- An eighteenth-century watermill.

== Transport ==
The Chemin de fer d'Anvin à Calais opened a railway station at Ouve-Wirquin in 1881. The railway was closed in 1955.

== See also ==
- Communes of the Pas-de-Calais department
