= Zudausques =

Zudausques Zuid-Elseke
- Commune
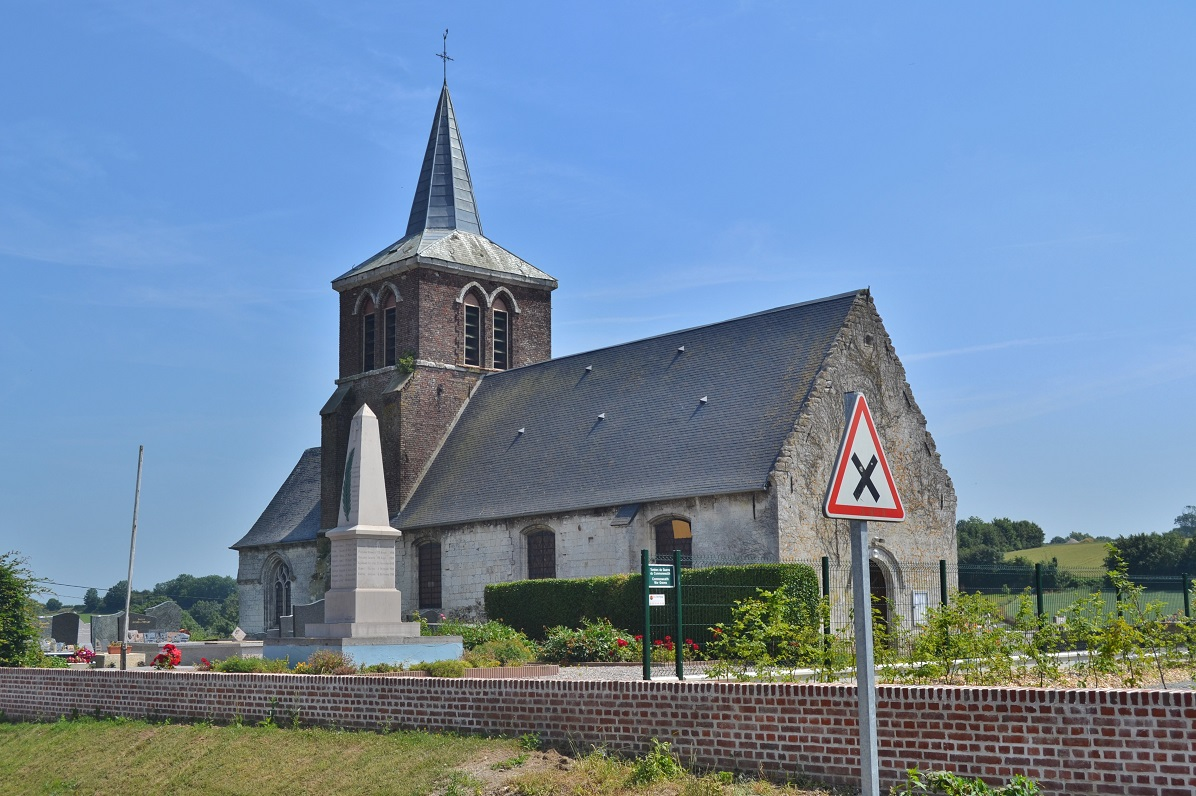
- The church of Zudausques

- Coat of arms
- Location of Zudausques
- Location within France Location within Hauts-de-France
- Coordinates: 50°45′00″N 2°08′59″E
- Country: France
- Region: Hauts-de-France
- Department: Pas-de-Calais
- Arrondissement: Saint-Omer
- Canton: Lumbres
- Intercommunality: Pays de Lumbres

Government
  - Mayor (2020–2026): Didier Bée
- Area^{1}: 7.24 km^{2} (2.80 sq mi)
- Elevation: 73 m (240 ft)
- Highest elevation: 126 m (413 ft)
- Lowest elevation: 34 m (112 ft)
- Population (2023): 1,084
  - Density: 150/km^{2} (388/sq mi)
- Demonym(s): Zudausquois, Zudausquoises
- Time zone: UTC+01:00 (CET)
  - Summer (DST): UTC+02:00 (CEST)
- INSEE/Postal code: 62905 /62500
- ^{1} French Land Register data, which excludes lakes, ponds, glaciers > 1 km^{2} (0.386 sq mi or 247 acres) and river estuaries.

Zudausques (French pronunciation: [zydosk]; West Flemish: Zuid-Elseke) is a commune in the Pas-de-Calais department in the Hauts-de-France region of France.

== Geography ==
Zudausques includes the four hamlets of Adsoit, Cormette, Noircarme and Leuline, located 6 miles (9 km) west of Saint-Omer, at the D206 road junction with the D46.

== Population ==
Historical population

Year	Pop.	±% p.a.
1793	406	—
1821	365	−0.38%
1846	501	+1.27%
1872	498	−0.02%
1901	481	−0.12%
1926	416	−0.58%
1946	402	−0.17%
1962	380	−0.35%
1968	365	−0.67%

Year	Pop.	±% p.a.
1975	356	−0.36%
1982	423	+2.49%
1990	513	+2.44%
1999	618	+2.09%
2007	784	+3.02%
2012	845	+1.51%
2017	915	+1.60%
2023	1,084	+2.87%

Source: EHESS (1793-1999) and INSEE

== Places of interest ==
- The church of St.Omer, dating from the fifteenth century.
- The church of St. Folquin at Cornettes, dating from the seventeenth century.

== See also ==
- Communes of the Pas-de-Calais department
