= Quercamps =

Quercamps Kerskamp
- Commune
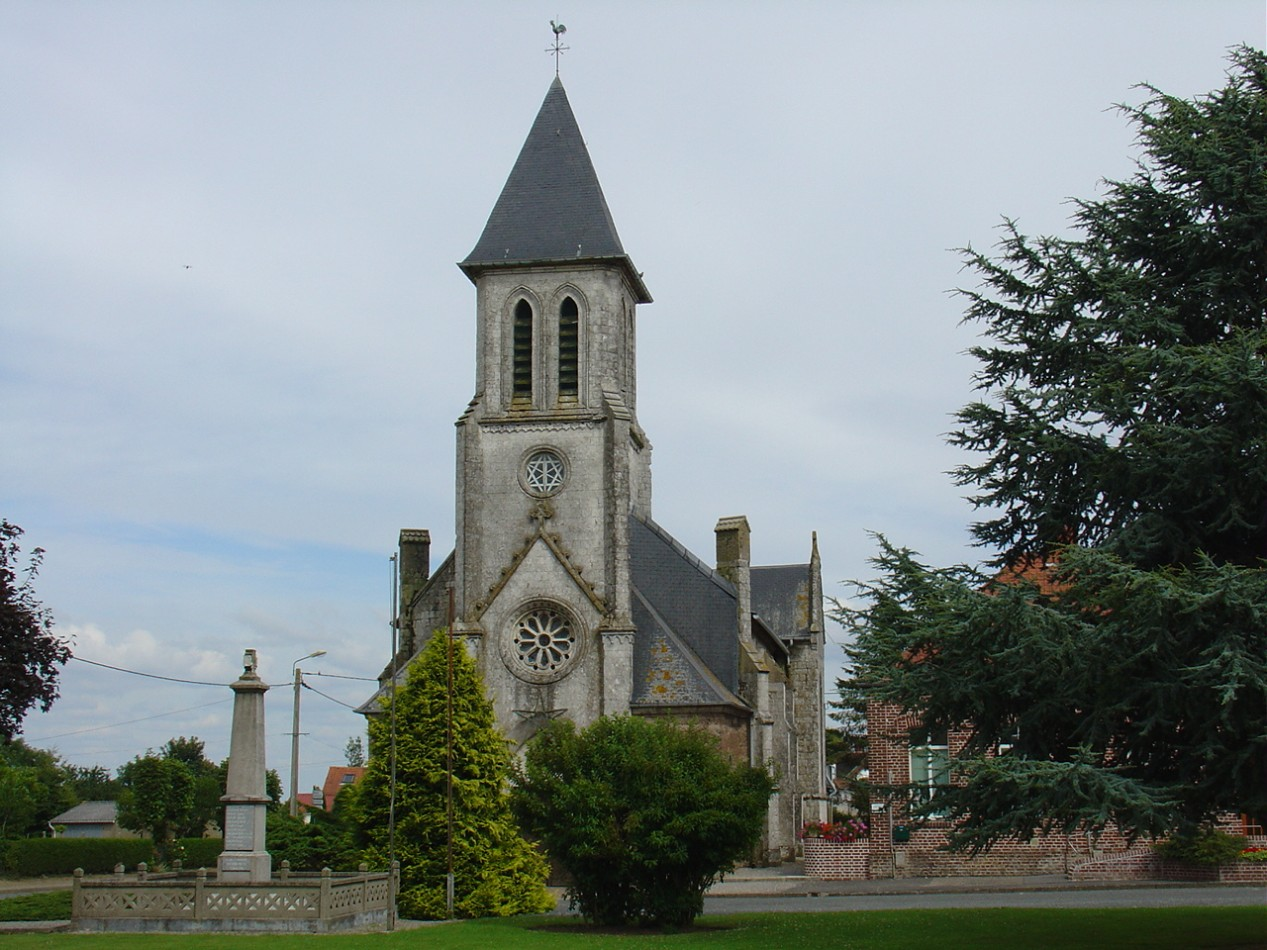
- The church of Quercamps

- Coat of arms
- Location of Quercamps
- Location within France Location within Hauts-de-France
- Coordinates: 50°45′09″N 2°03′09″E
- Country: France
- Region: Hauts-de-France
- Department: Pas-de-Calais
- Arrondissement: Saint-Omer
- Canton: Lumbres
- Intercommunality: Pays de Lumbres

Government
  - Mayor (2020–2026): Jacques Bacquet
- Area^{1}: 1.98 km^{2} (0.76 sq mi)
- Elevation: 172 m (564 ft)
- Highest elevation: 184 m (604 ft)
- Lowest elevation: 143 m (469 ft)
- Population (2023): 292
  - Density: 147/km^{2} (382/sq mi)
- Time zone: UTC+01:00 (CET)
  - Summer (DST): UTC+02:00 (CEST)
- INSEE/Postal code: 62675 /62380
- ^{1} French Land Register data, which excludes lakes, ponds, glaciers > 1 km^{2} (0.386 sq mi or 247 acres) and river estuaries.

Quercamps (French pronunciation: [kɛʁkɑ̃]; West Flemish: Kerskamp) is a commune in the Pas-de-Calais department in the Hauts-de-France region of France about 10 miles (16 km) west of Saint-Omer.

== Population ==
Historical population
Year	Pop.	±% p.a.
1968	183	—
1975	202	+1.42%
1982	237	+2.31%
1990	294	+2.73%
1999	288	−0.23%
2007	282	−0.26%
2012	260	−1.61%
2017	269	+0.68%
2023	292	+1.38%
Source: INSEE

== See also ==
- Communes of the Pas-de-Calais department
