= Seninghem =

- Commune
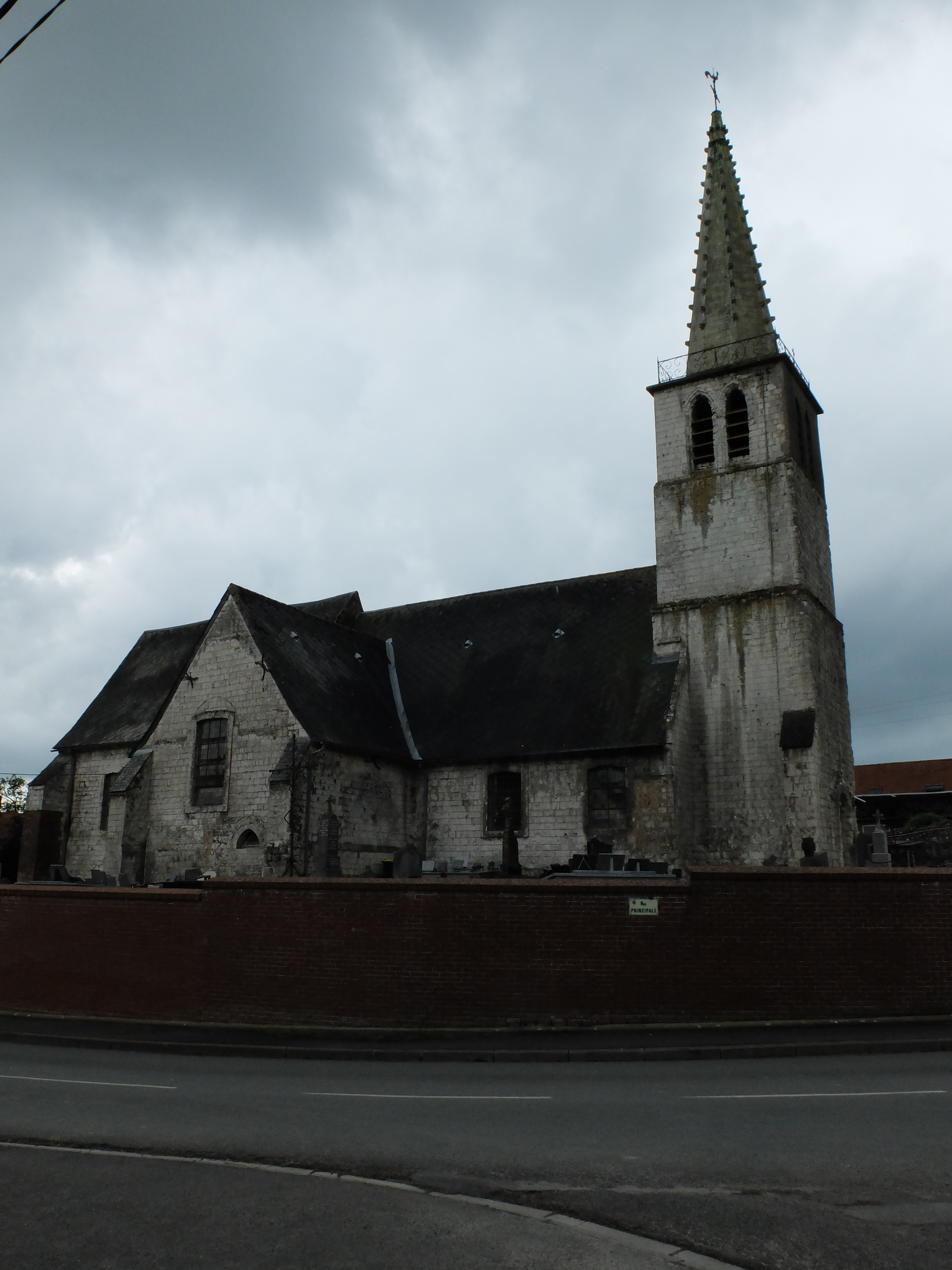
- The church of Seninghem

- Coat of arms
- Location of Seninghem
- Location within France Location within Hauts-de-France
- Coordinates: 50°42′12″N 2°02′05″E
- Country: France
- Region: Hauts-de-France
- Department: Pas-de-Calais
- Arrondissement: Saint-Omer
- Canton: Lumbres
- Intercommunality: Pays de Lumbres

Government
  - Mayor (2020–2026): Christian Tellier
- Area^{1}: 15.15 km^{2} (5.85 sq mi)
- Elevation: 150 m (490 ft)
- Highest elevation: 209 m (686 ft)
- Lowest elevation: 65 m (213 ft)
- Population (2023): 685
  - Density: 45.2/km^{2} (117/sq mi)
- Time zone: UTC+01:00 (CET)
  - Summer (DST): UTC+02:00 (CEST)
- INSEE/Postal code: 62788 /62380
- ^{1} French Land Register data, which excludes lakes, ponds, glaciers > 1 km^{2} (0.386 sq mi or 247 acres) and river estuaries.

Seninghem (French pronunciation: [sənɛ̃ɡɑ̃]) is a commune in the Pas-de-Calais department in the Hauts-de-France region of France.

== Geography ==
Seninghem is located approximately 10 miles (16 km) west of Saint-Omer, on the D204 road.

== Population ==
Historical population
Year	Pop.	±% p.a.
1968	455	—
1975	467	+0.37%
1982	445	−0.69%
1990	508	+1.67%
1999	519	+0.24%
2007	584	+1.49%
2012	674	+2.91%
2017	722	+1.39%
2023	685	−0.87%
Source: INSEE

== Places of interest ==
- The seventeenth-century church of St Martin.
- The seventeenth-century chapel of Notre Dame.
- The ‘Arcs de Triomphe’ at the cemetery entrances.

== See also ==
- Communes of the Pas-de-Calais department
