= Remilly-Wirquin =

- Commune
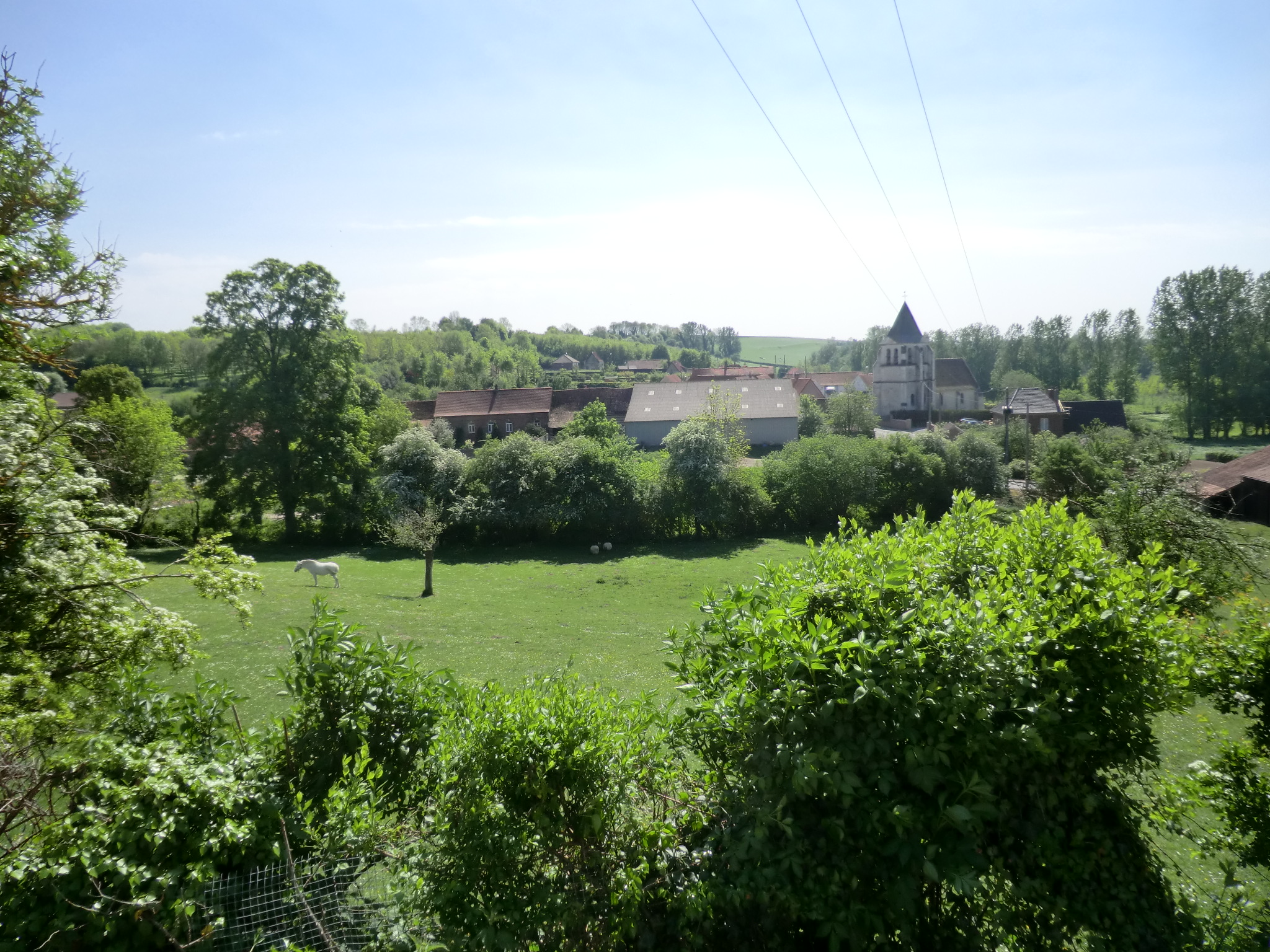
- A general view of Remilly-Wirquin

- Coat of arms
- Location of Remilly-Wirquin
- Location within France Location within Hauts-de-France
- Coordinates: 50°40′09″N 2°10′04″E
- Country: France
- Region: Hauts-de-France
- Department: Pas-de-Calais
- Arrondissement: Saint-Omer
- Canton: Lumbres
- Intercommunality: Pays de Lumbres

Government
  - Mayor (2020–2026): Paule Rolland
- Area^{1}: 5.23 km^{2} (2.02 sq mi)
- Elevation: 52 m (171 ft)
- Highest elevation: 135 m (443 ft)
- Lowest elevation: 47 m (154 ft)
- Population (2023): 355
  - Density: 67.9/km^{2} (176/sq mi)
- Time zone: UTC+01:00 (CET)
  - Summer (DST): UTC+02:00 (CEST)
- INSEE/Postal code: 62702 /62380
- ^{1} French Land Register data, which excludes lakes, ponds, glaciers > 1 km^{2} (0.386 sq mi or 247 acres) and river estuaries.

Remilly-Wirquin (French pronunciation: [ʁəmiji viʁkɛ̃]; Picard: Armilly-Wilquin) is a commune in the Pas-de-Calais department in the Hauts-de-France region of France.

== Geography ==
Remilly-Wirquin lies about 8 miles (13 km) southwest of Saint-Omer, on the D192 road, by the banks of the river Aa.

== Population ==
Historical population
Year	Pop.	±% p.a.
1968	215	—
1975	234	+1.22%
1982	283	+2.75%
1990	327	+1.82%
1999	315	−0.41%
2007	353	+1.43%
2012	334	−1.10%
2017	349	+0.88%
2023	355	+0.28%
Source: INSEE

== Places of interest ==
- The church of St.Omer, dating from the thirteenth century.

== Transport ==
The Chemin de fer d'Anvin à Calais opened a railway station at Remilly-Wirquin in 1881. There was also a halt at Wirquin. The railway was closed in 1955.

== See also ==
- Communes of the Pas-de-Calais department
