= Bléquin =

Bléquin Belken
- Commune
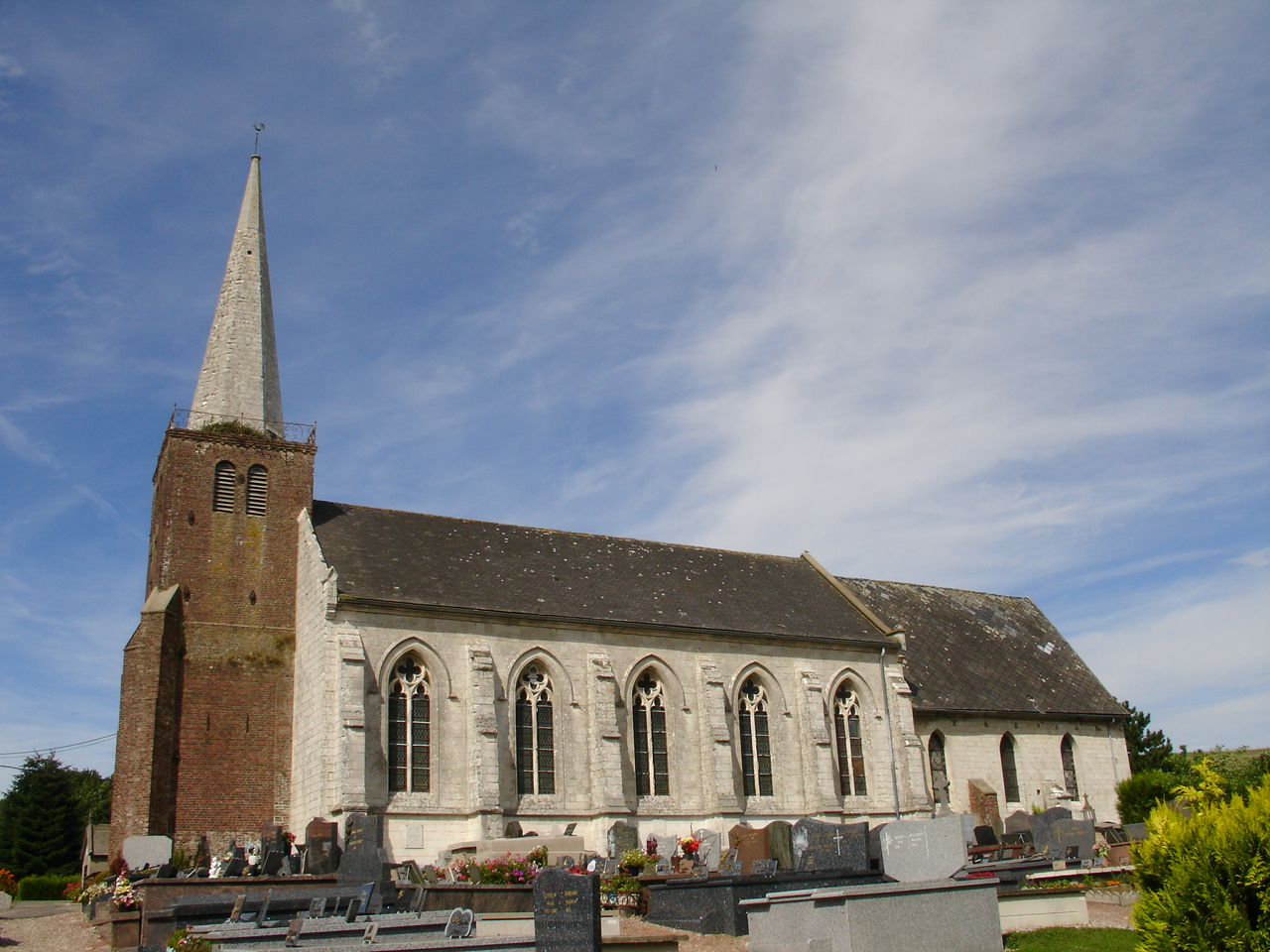
- The church of Bléquin

- Coat of arms
- Location of Bléquin
- Location within France Location within Hauts-de-France
- Coordinates: 50°39′51″N 1°59′24″E
- Country: France
- Region: Hauts-de-France
- Department: Pas-de-Calais
- Arrondissement: Saint-Omer
- Canton: Lumbres
- Intercommunality: Pays de Lumbres

Government
  - Mayor (2020–2026): Jean Gardin
- Area^{1}: 8.69 km^{2} (3.36 sq mi)
- Elevation: 115 m (377 ft)
- Highest elevation: 208 m (682 ft)
- Lowest elevation: 98 m (322 ft)
- Population (2023): 490
  - Density: 56/km^{2} (150/sq mi)
- Time zone: UTC+01:00 (CET)
  - Summer (DST): UTC+02:00 (CEST)
- INSEE/Postal code: 62140 /62380
- ^{1} French Land Register data, which excludes lakes, ponds, glaciers > 1 km^{2} (0.386 sq mi or 247 acres) and river estuaries.

Bléquin (French pronunciation: [blekɛ̃]; West Flemish: Belken) is a commune in the Pas-de-Calais department in the Hauts-de-France region in northern France.

== Geography ==
A village situated 15 miles (24 km) southwest of Saint-Omer, on the D202 road.

== Population ==
Historical population
Year	Pop.	±% p.a.
1968	471	—
1975	395	−2.48%
1982	363	−1.20%
1990	368	+0.17%
1999	339	−0.91%
2007	343	+0.15%
2012	480	+6.95%
2017	519	+1.57%
2023	490	−0.95%
Source: INSEE

== Sights ==
- The nineteenth-century church of St. Omer.
- The ruins of a 13th-century chateau.

== See also ==
- Communes of the Pas-de-Calais department
