= La Coupole =

WWII Nazi-built bunker complex in France

- Bauvorhaben 21; Schotterwerk Nordwest; Coupole d'Helfaut
- close to Wizernes & Helfaut, Nord-Pas-de-Calais, France
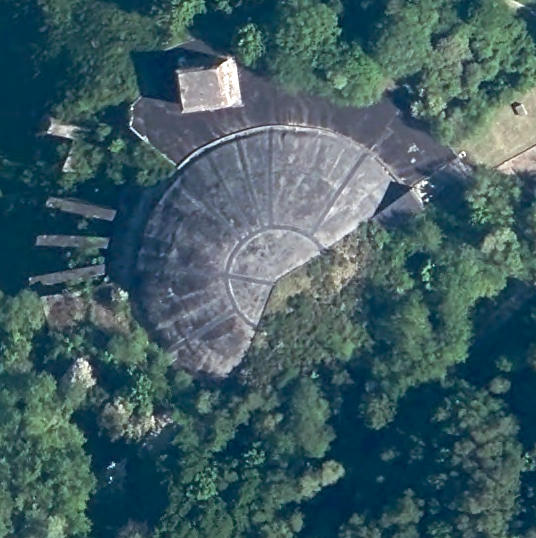
- View of the dome of La Coupole

Site information
- Type: Bunker
- Owner: Conseil Général du Pas-de-Calais
- Controlled by: France
- Open to the public: History and Remembrance Centre

Location
- Location within France
- Coordinates: 50.7052616°N 2.2436221°E

Site history
- Built: October 1943 – July 1944
- Built by: Organisation Todt
- In use: Never completed
- Materials: Concrete
- Battles/wars: 1944: Operation Crossbow campaign
- Events: September 1944: Captured by Allies; May 1997: Reopened as a museum

Garrison information
- Garrison: Abteilungen (English: firing detachment) comprising one technical and two operational batteries

La Coupole (English: The Dome), also known as the Coupole d'Helfaut-Wizernes and originally codenamed Bauvorhaben 21 ('Building Project 21') or Schotterwerk Nordwest (Northwest Gravel Works), is a Second World War bunker complex in the Pas-de-Calais department of northern France, about 5 kilometres (3.1 mi) from Saint-Omer, and some 14.4 kilometers (8.9 miles) south-southeast from the less developed Blockhaus d'Éperlecques V-2 launch installation in the same area. It was built by the forces of Nazi Germany between 1943 and 1944 to serve as a launch base for V-2 rockets directed against London and southern England and is the earliest known precursor to modern underground missile silos still in existence.

Constructed in the side of a disused chalk quarry, the most prominent feature of the complex is an immense concrete dome, to which its modern name refers. It was built above a network of tunnels housing storage areas, launch facilities and crew quarters. The facility was designed to store a large stockpile of V-2s, warheads and fuel and was intended to launch V-2s on an industrial scale. Dozens of missiles a day were to be fuelled, prepared and launched in rapid sequence against London and southern England.

Following repeated heavy bombing by Allied forces during Operation Crossbow, the Germans were unable to complete the construction works and the complex never entered service. It was captured by the Allies in September 1944, partially demolished on the orders of Winston Churchill to prevent its reuse as a military base, and then abandoned. It remained derelict until the mid-1990s, when efforts to preserve the site commenced. In 1997 it opened to the public for the first time, as a museum. Exhibits in the tunnels and under the dome tell the story of the German occupation of France during World War II, the V-weapons and the history of space exploration.

== Background ==
The V-2 rocket was one of several innovative long-range weapons developed by the Germans after the failure of the Luftwaffe to strike a decisive blow against Britain. It was a revolutionary weapon—the world's first operational SRBM—that had been developed in a secret programme begun in 1936. The German leadership hoped that a barrage of rockets unleashed against London would force Britain out of the war. Although Adolf Hitler was at first ambivalent, he eventually became an enthusiastic supporter of the V-2 programme as Allied air forces carried out increasingly devastating attacks on German cities.

The 12.5-ton missile, standing 14 metres (46 ft) high on its launch pad, was fuelled primarily by liquid oxygen (LOX) and ethanol. Deploying the V-2 on a large scale required far more LOX than was available from existing production sites in Germany and the occupied countries. New sources of LOX were required, situated close to the missile launching sites to reduce as far as possible the loss of propellant through evaporation. The missile's operational range of 320 kilometres (200 mi) meant that the launch sites had to be fairly close to the English Channel or southern North Sea coasts, in northern France, Belgium or the western Netherlands.

Because of the complexity of the missile and the need for extensive testing prior to launch, the V-2's designers at the Peenemünde Army Research Center favoured using heavily defended fixed sites where the missiles could be stored, armed, and fuelled from an on-site LOX production plant before launching. The German Army and the V-2 project's head, Major-General Walter Dornberger, were concerned that the sites would be vulnerable to aerial attack by the Allies. The Army's preferred option was to use Meillerwagen, mobile firing batteries, which presented a much smaller target for the Allied air forces.

The Army was nonetheless overruled by Hitler, who had a long-standing preference for huge, grandiose constructions. He preferred fixed installations along the lines of the virtually impregnable U-boat pens that had been built to protect Germany's U-boat fleet. In March 1943, he ordered the construction of a massive bunker (now known as the Blockhaus d'Éperlecques) in the Forest of Éperlecques near Watten, north of Saint-Omer. The bunker was soon spotted by Allied reconnaissance, and on 27 August 1943, a raid by 187 Boeing B-17 Flying Fortress bombers wrecked the construction site before it could be completed. A surviving portion was reused by the Germans as a LOX production facility.

== Design and location ==
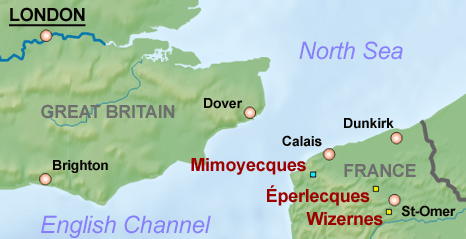
Map of the Pas-de-Calais and south-eastern England showing the location of Wizernes and other major V-weapons sites

The successful attack against the Watten bunker forced the German Army to find an alternative location for a launch site nearby. They had already taken possession of an old quarry between the villages of Helfaut and Wizernes, south-west of Saint-Omer and some 12 kilometres (7.5 mi) south of the Watten bunker, near the river Aa alongside the Boulogne–Saint-Omer railway line, about 1 km (0.62 mi) from Wizernes station. The quarry had been designated for use as a missile storage depot where V-2s would be housed in tunnels bored into the chalk hillside before being transported for launching. The Germans undertook major work in August 1943 to lay extensive railway sidings to connect the quarry to the main line.

On 30 September 1943, Hitler met with Albert Speer, the Minister of Armaments and War Production, and Franz Xaver Dorsch, the chief engineer of the Todt Organisation, to discuss plans for a replacement for the out-of-commission Watten facility. Dorsch proposed to transform the Wizernes depot into a vast bomb-proof underground complex that would require a million tons of concrete to build. It would be constructed within a network of tunnels to be dug inside the hillside at the edge of the quarry. A concrete dome, 5 m (16 ft) thick, 71 metres (233 ft) in diameter and weighing 55,000 tons, would be built over the top of the central part of the facility to protect it from Allied bombing. Beneath it, about 7 kilometres (4.3 mi) of tunnels were to be dug into the chalk hillside to accommodate workshops, storerooms, fuel supplies, a LOX manufacturing plant, generators, barracks and a hospital.

Maps and plans of the Wizernes site
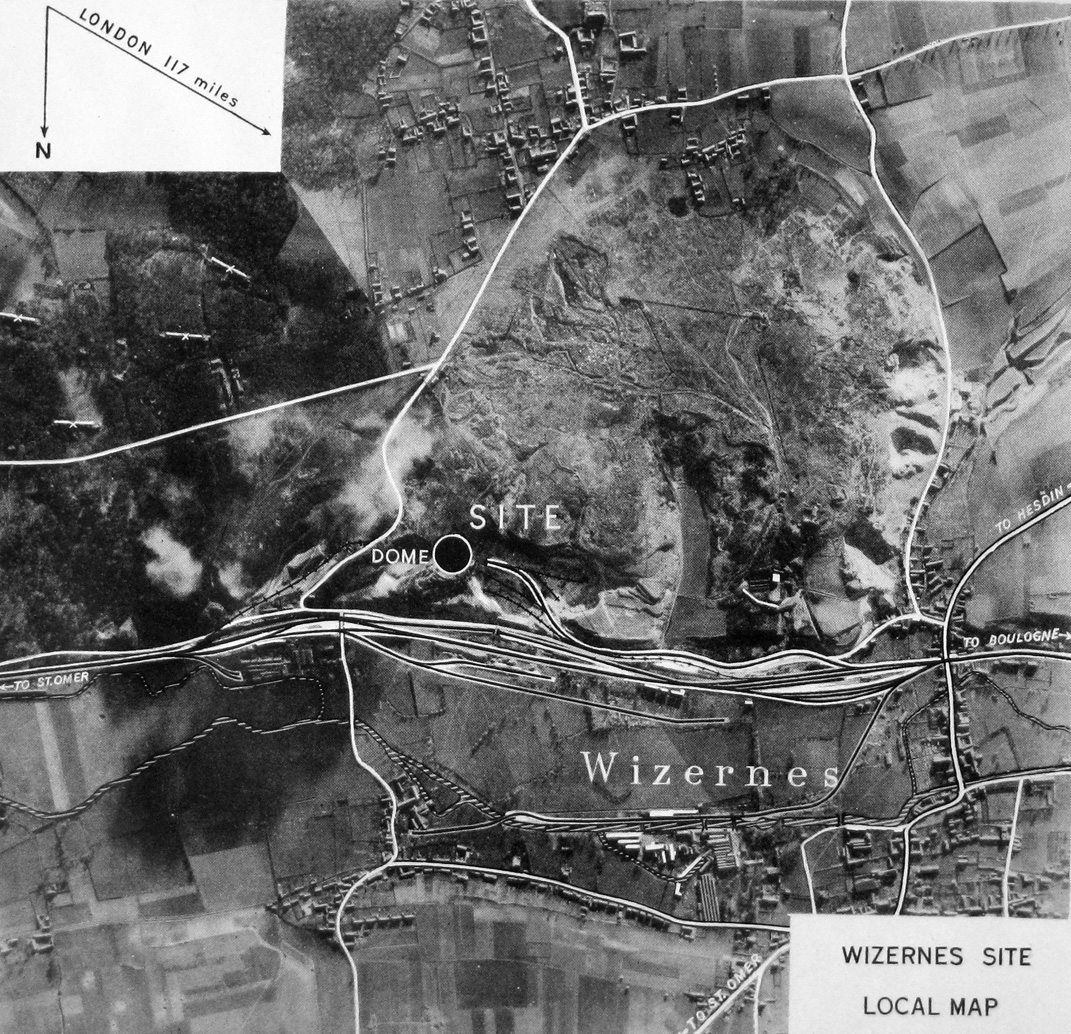
Photo map of the area around the site before the bombing campaign

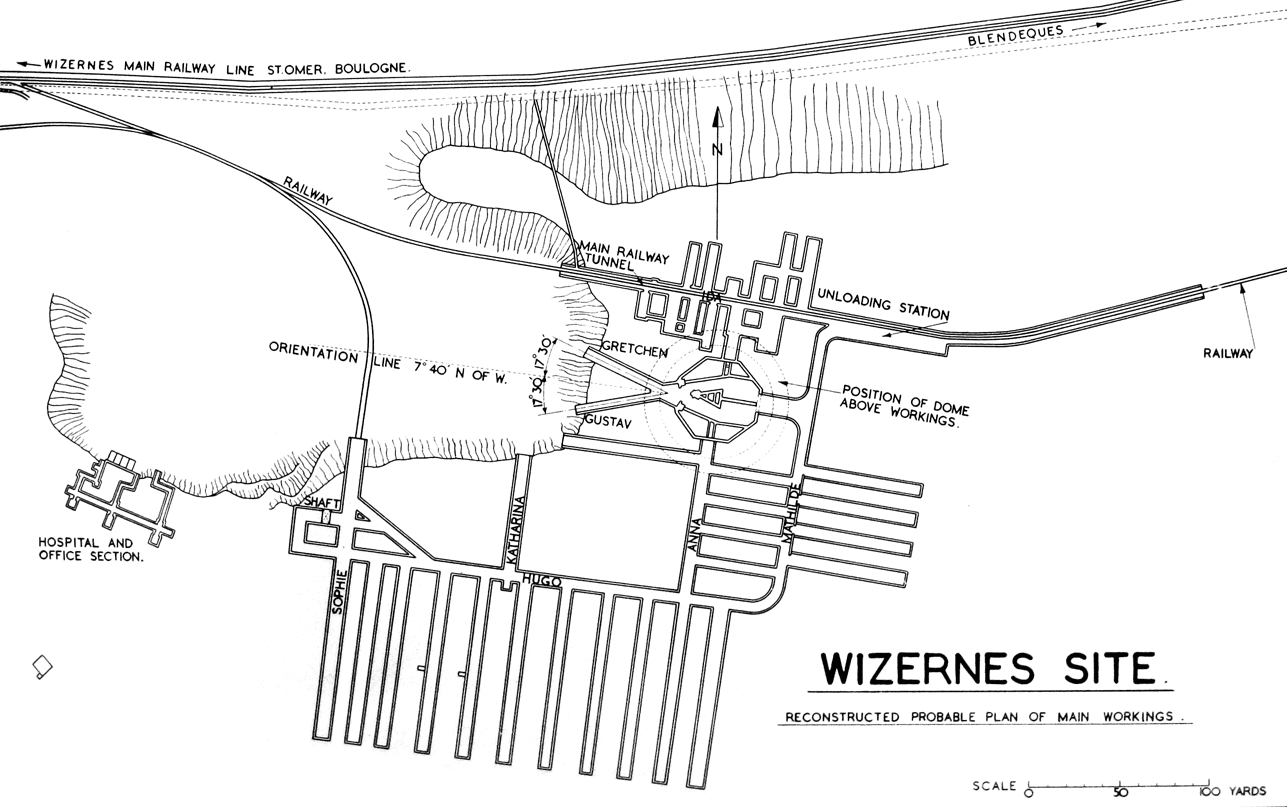
Plan of the Wizernes complex as built by September 1944

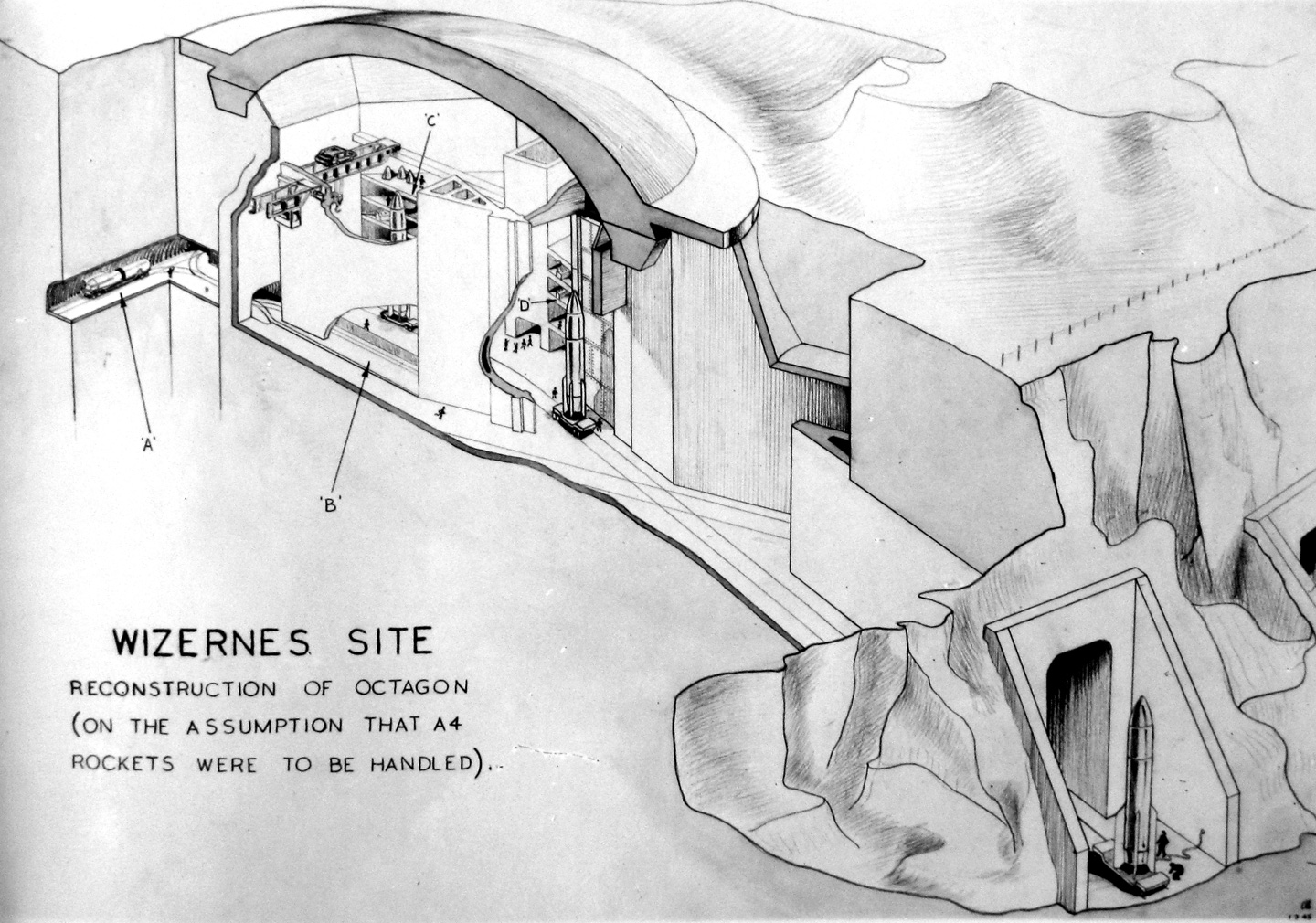
1944 conjectural reconstruction of the rocket preparation chamber and tunnels (on the assumption that A4 rockets were to be handled)

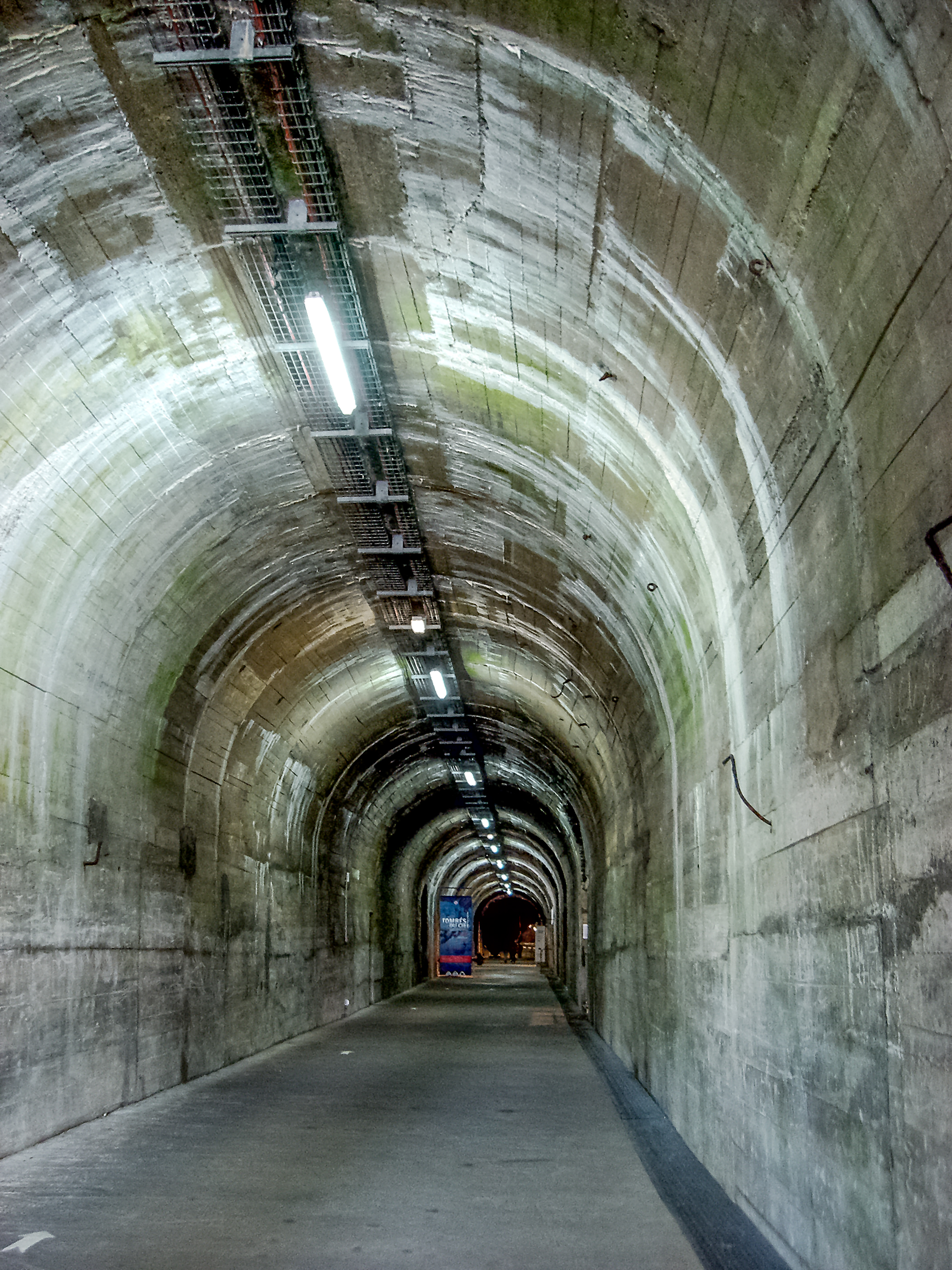
The Ida railway tunnel, where V-2s and supplies would be brought in by train and unloaded

A standard gauge railway tunnel, codenamed Ida, was to be built on a curving path that would connect it with both the east- and west-bound main line railway, allowing trains to run straight through the complex without needing to reverse or be turned around. This would serve as the main unloading station, where missiles and supplies would be offloaded onto trolleys that would transport them into the connecting galleries Mathilde and Hugo. Hugo connected in turn with Sophie, a dead-end railway tunnel branching from the main line into Ida. Each of the main tunnels had a number of unnamed side tunnels of the same dimensions as the main tunnels and up to 90 metres (300 ft) long. The central feature of the complex was a huge octagonal rocket-preparation chamber directly under the dome. It was never completed but would have been 41 metres (135 ft) in diameter and up to 33 metres (108 ft) high. A number of intermediate floors, possibly as many as ten, would have been built up the sides of the chamber.

The western side of the chamber opened onto two tall passageways, opening onto two tracks to the outdoor launchpads, with the tracked passages and launchpads named Gustav (the southerly-located pad) and Gretchen (the northerly-located pad), both on the western side of the domed complex. Each was to have been protected by bomb-proof doors made of steel and concrete. The passageways were to be 4 metres (13 ft) wide and at least 17 metres (56 ft) high and were angled in a Y-shape, both exiting westwards into the quarry. The outdoor launchpads for the V-2 rockets would have been at the end of each passageway. The two passageways were angled at 64° 50' and 99° 50' west of north respectively—not aligned with any probable target but merely permitting the rockets to be transported to either one or the other, of their pair of sufficiently separated launch pads.

The facility was designed, as was its predecessor at Watten, to receive, process and launch V-2 rockets at a high rate. Trains carrying V-2s would enter the heart of the complex through the Ida rail tunnel, where they would be unloaded. A large number of V-2s could be stored in the side tunnels; liquid oxygen would be produced on-site with five machines and a combined monthly capacity of 1500 tons. When the time came, the rockets would be moved into the octagonal preparation chamber where they would be lifted to a vertical position for fuelling and arming. From there they would be transported on motorised launch carriages, still in a vertical position, through the Gustav and Gretchen passageways. The launch pads were located at the end of the track on the floor of the quarry, from where the missiles would be fired.

The priority target for the V-2s was 188 kilometres (117 mi) away: London, which Hitler wanted to see pulverised by the end of 1943. The Allies were alarmed when an analyst found that part of the complex was aligned within half a degree of the Great Circle bearing on New York City, and its equipment was large enough to accommodate a rocket twice the size of the V-2: the "America Rocket", the proposed A10 intercontinental ballistic missile.

Although physically separate, another facility built in nearby Roquetoire was an integral part of the Wizernes complex. Umspannwerk C was built to house a Leitstrahl radio command guidance system which could be used to send course corrections to missiles launched from Wizernes to fine-tune their trajectory during the launch phase.

== Construction ==
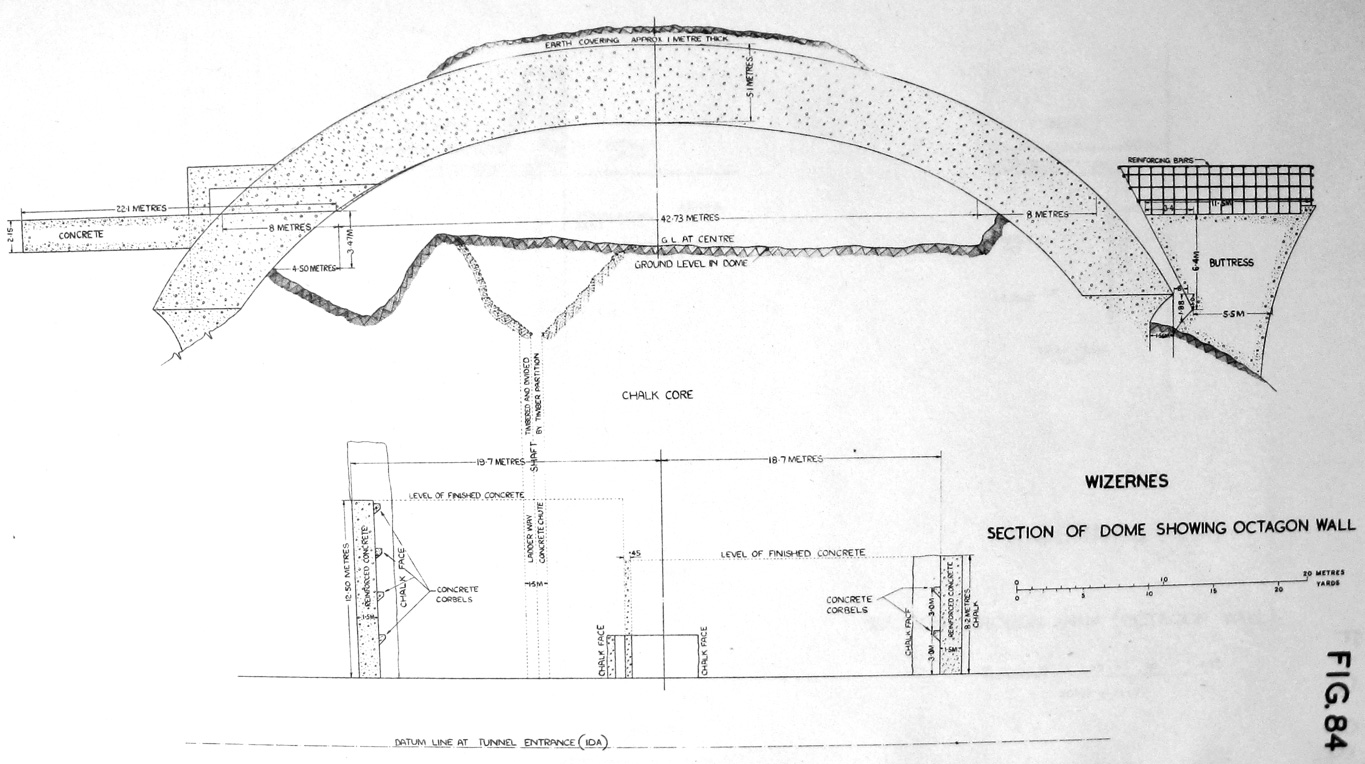
Cross-section of the dome

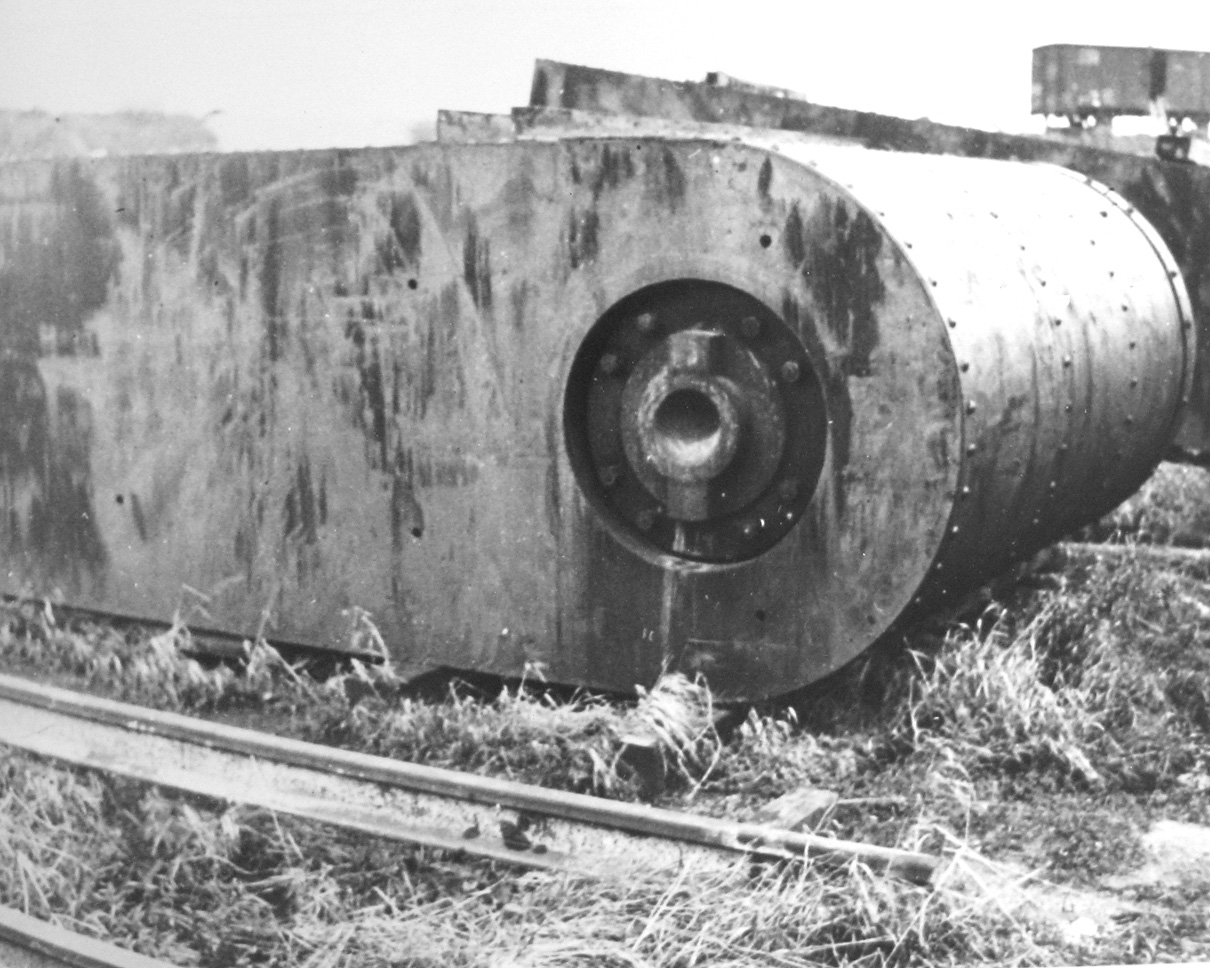
Section of one of the bomb-proof doors for either Gustav or Gretchen tunnels. Segments of the doors were found by Allied troops at a storage dump near the Watten railway station.

The Allies first noticed construction activity at Wizernes in mid-August 1943 when the Germans began building railway track and the offloading stores into the old quarry. After Hitler authorised the decision to turn the depot into a missile launch site, construction was accelerated. Work on the dome began in November 1943 and tunnelling in the cliff face below began in December. At the start of January, Allied reconnaissance aircraft observed an elaborate system of camouflage on the hilltop, installed to conceal the dome. The building works were greatly hindered by the constant air-raid warnings, which stopped work 229 times in May 1944 alone. In response to Hitler's desire to see the site completed the workforce was expanded substantially from 1,100 in April 1944 to nearly 1,400 by June. About 60% of the workers were Germans; skilled workers, such as miners from Westphalia, were recruited to excavate the tunnels and build the dome. The remainder were slave labour: principally Frenchmen conscripted by the Service du travail obligatoire (STO), plus Soviet prisoners of war. The project was overseen by several large German construction companies, with Philipp Holzman A.G. of Frankfurt am Main and the Grossdeutsche Schachtbau and Tiefbohr GmbH serving as the chief contractors.

One of the most difficult challenges faced by the Germans was constructing the great dome while under regular air attack. The dome's designer, Todt Organisation engineer Werner Flos, devised a plan under which the dome would be built first, flat upon the ground, and the soil underneath it would be excavated so that the construction works below would be protected against aerial attacks. A circular trench was excavated on the top of the hill above the quarry to an outside diameter of 84 metres (276 ft). The dome was built within this trench and the galleries and octagonal preparation chamber were excavated below.

As an additional bomb-proofing method, the dome was surrounded by a bomb-proof "skirt" or Zerschellerplatte of steel-reinforced concrete, 14 metres (46 ft) wide and 2 metres (6.6 ft) thick. This was supported by a series of buttresses, which were not tied into the dome itself, above the entrances to the Gustav and Gretchen tunnels. Another concrete structure was tied into the skirt to the north-west of the dome, which was perhaps intended for use as an observation and control tower. A separate underground building was constructed on the western side of the quarry to serve as a hospital and as offices for the engineers. A Decauville narrow-gauge railway was installed on the quarry floor to transport supplies from the main line to the construction site.

A cube-shaped concrete building was constructed on the top of the hill, next to the dome. This was intended to be used as the bomb-proof outlet for a ventilation and air conditioning shaft. It was an essential component of a facility where dangerous and explosive gases were expected to be used in large quantities on a daily basis. It was never finished, and the Allies found when they captured the site that the ventilation shaft had not been fully excavated. The building survived the bombing intact and is still prominently visible today.

Unlike its sister site at Watten, there was no on-site power plant. Electricity at Wizernes was provided by a connection to the main electric grid, with power consumption estimated at between 5,000 and 6,000 kVA.

== Discovery and Allied attacks ==
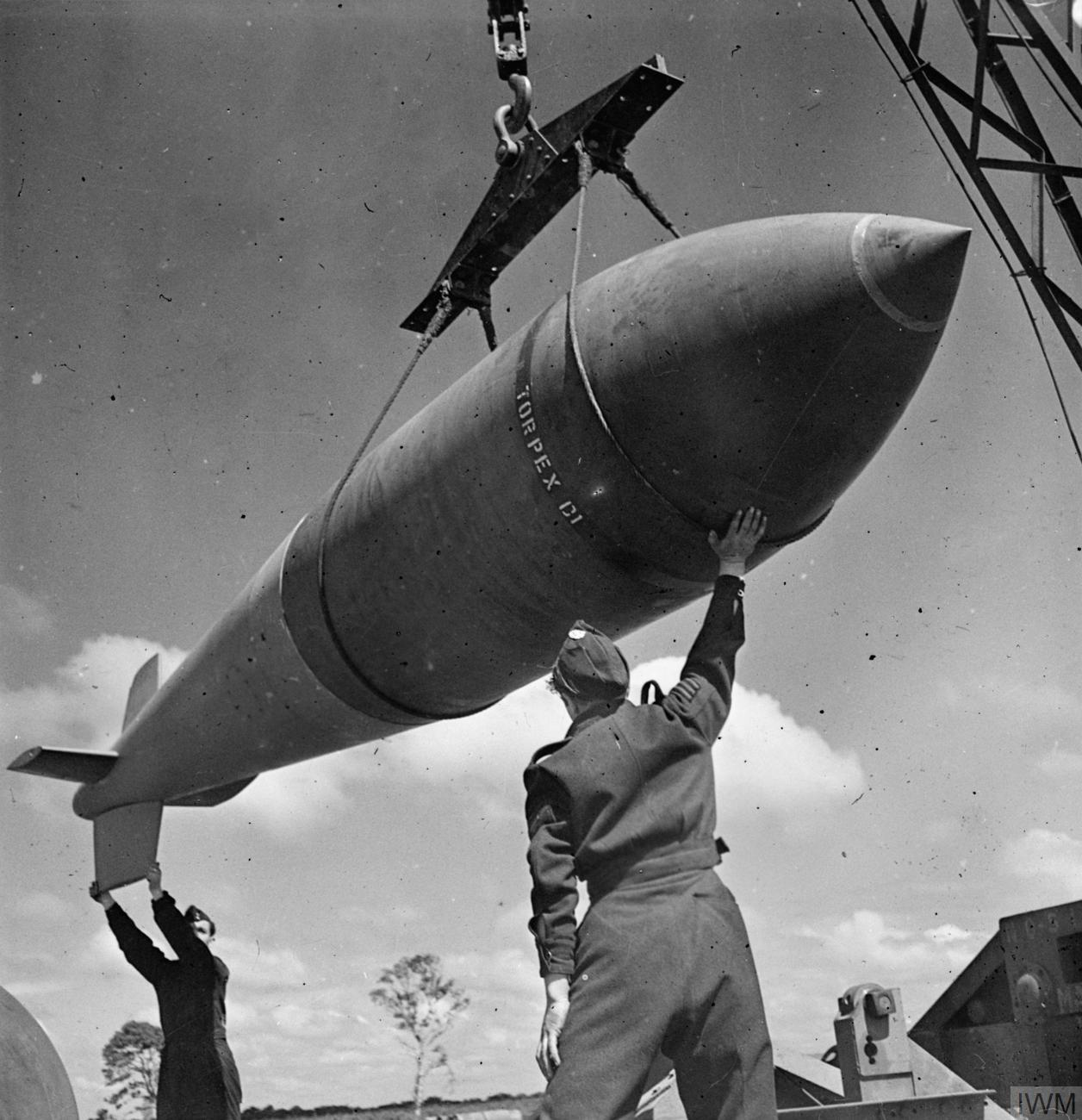
RAF ground crew handling one of the Tallboy bombs that was dropped on Wizernes during an attack by 617 Squadron (1944)

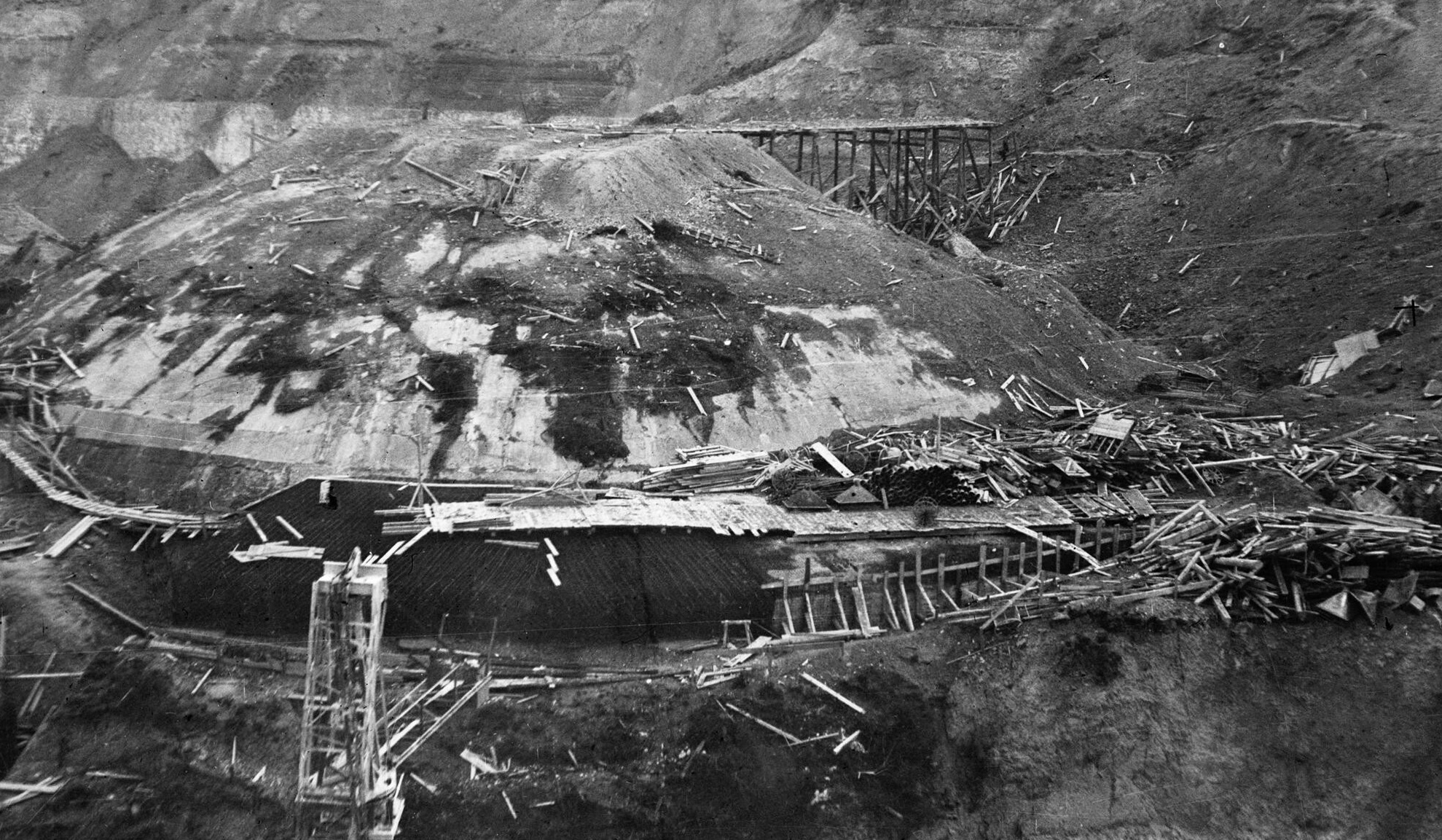
A photograph taken by a British de Havilland Mosquito aircraft flying only 20 metres (66 ft) above the ground shows the dome, still intact, sitting at the centre of the wrecked construction site on 6 July 1944, shortly before its abandonment.

The Allies became aware of the Wizernes site in August 1943 when the Germans began laying extensive new rail sidings which were spotted by RAF reconnaissance flights. Late 1943, a Belgian, Jacques de Duve, supported by German opponents, informed MI5 about the existence of a rocket production site in Saint-Omer. MI5 did not believe de Duve, who was interned for the rest of the war in Latchmere House. In November 1943, the Allied Central Interpretation Unit reported that the Germans had begun constructing the concrete dome and were undertaking tunnelling works in the east face of the quarry. However, it was not until the following March that the Allies added the site to the list of targets for the bombing campaign against V-weapon sites that had already wrecked the Watten bunker and numerous V-1 flying bomb launching sites. Over the next few months, the USAAF and RAF carried out 16 air raids involving 811 bombers that dropped some 4,260 tons of bombs. The bombing caused destruction across a wide area, killing 55 residents of the nearby village of Helfault.

Conventional bombing raids only achieved a single bomb hit on the dome itself, causing negligible damage. However, in June and July 1944 the RAF began attacking the site with 12,000-pound (5,400 kg), ground-penetrating Tallboy bombs. The external construction works were completely wrecked by the bombing and one Tallboy landed just beside the dome, blowing out the entire quarry cliff face and burying the entrances to the Gustav and Gretchen tunnels. The entrance to Sophie was also buried, leaving Ida as the only entrance to the facility. The dome was unscathed but the buttresses supporting the protective Zerschellerplatte were dislodged and slid partway down into the quarry. Serious damage was also caused to the tunnels beneath the dome. The damage made it impossible to continue work on the site. Dornberger complained: "Persistent air attack with heavy and super-heavy bombs so battered the rock all around that in the spring of 1944 landslides made further work impossible." His staff reported on 28 July 1944 that, although the dome had not been hit by the Tallboys, "the whole area around has been so churned up that it is unapproachable, and the bunker is jeopardised from underneath."

Although three launch battalions were formed by the Germans in late 1943, they never got the chance to deploy to the V-weapons launch sites at Watten and Wizernes. On 3 July 1944, the Oberkommando West authorised the cessation of construction at the heavily damaged sites. On 18 July 1944, Hitler abandoned plans for launching V-2s from bunkers and authorized the downgrading of the Wizernes bunker to make it a LOX production facility. However, these plans were overtaken by the Allied liberation of Northern France following the Normandy landings. The site was finally abandoned a few days before the Allies reached it at the start of September during the rapid liberation of the area by British, American, Canadian and Polish troops. British engineers inspected it on 5 September.

=== Allied air raids ===
Bombing missions against Wizernes
Date	
11 March 1944	34 of 51 Consolidated B-24 Liberators of the 2d Bombardment Division's 44th and 93d Heavy Bombardment groups attacked Wizernes using blind-bombing techniques due to thick overcast, dropping 127 tons of bombs.
19 March 1944	152 Martin B-26 Marauders of IX Bomber Command attacked V-weapon sites around Saint-Omer.
26 March 1944	500 heavy bombers of the 8th Air Force attacked a total of 16 V-weapon sites in northern France, including Wizernes, dropping 1,271 tons of bombs. Allied losses were four Boeing B-17 Flying Fortresses and one B-24; a further 236 bombers were damaged by enemy fire.
17 April 1944	14 B-24 Liberators and five pathfinder aircraft used an experimental bombing technique to attack Wizernes.
25 April 1944	27 B-24 Liberators from 2d Bombardment Division bombed Wizernes in a special test of new pathfinding equipment.
3 May 1944	47 B-24 Liberators escorted by 101 fighters from VIII Fighter Command attacked Wizernes using blind-bombing techniques.
20 June 1944	17 Avro Lancasters supported by three de Havilland Mosquito of No 617 Squadron attempted to attack Wizernes but were forced to abort by cloud cover over the target.
22 June 1944	A second 617 Squadron attack on Wizernes (part of a large scale attack on the site and Mimoyecques and Siracourt) was again thwarted by cloud cover.
24 June 1944	617 Squadron returned to Wizernes with 16 Lancasters and 2 Mosquitos, losing one Lancaster to anti-aircraft fire. Several Tallboy bombs were dropped but failed to cause much damage.
28 June 1944	103 Handley Page Halifaxes and 5 Mosquitos from No. 4 Group and 2 Lancasters of the Pathfinder Force attacked Wizernes without loss.
17 July 1944	72 Halifaxes, 28 Stirlings, 20 Lancasters, 11 Mosquitos attacked three V-weapons sites including Wizernes, which was attacked with a dozen Tallboys. The squadron commander, Willie Tait, directed the attack from a North American Mustang. The attack caused severe damage to the site and buried the entrances to the launch tunnels Gustav and Gretchen. The site was abandoned a few weeks later.
20 July 1944	174 Lancasters, 165 Halifaxes and 30 Mosquitos attacked V-1 launching sites and the Wizernes site.
20/21 July 1944	54 Halifaxes, 23 Lancasters and 10 Mosquitos attacked V-weapon sites at Ardouval and Wizernes, but no bombs were dropped at Wizernes due to bad weather.
4 August 1944	An experimental Operation Aphrodite attack using four remotely controlled B-17 Flying Fortress drones packed with explosives against Mimoyecques, Siracourt, Watten, and Wizernes failed; the one targeted on Wizernes overshot by 2,000 feet.

== Post-war investigations ==
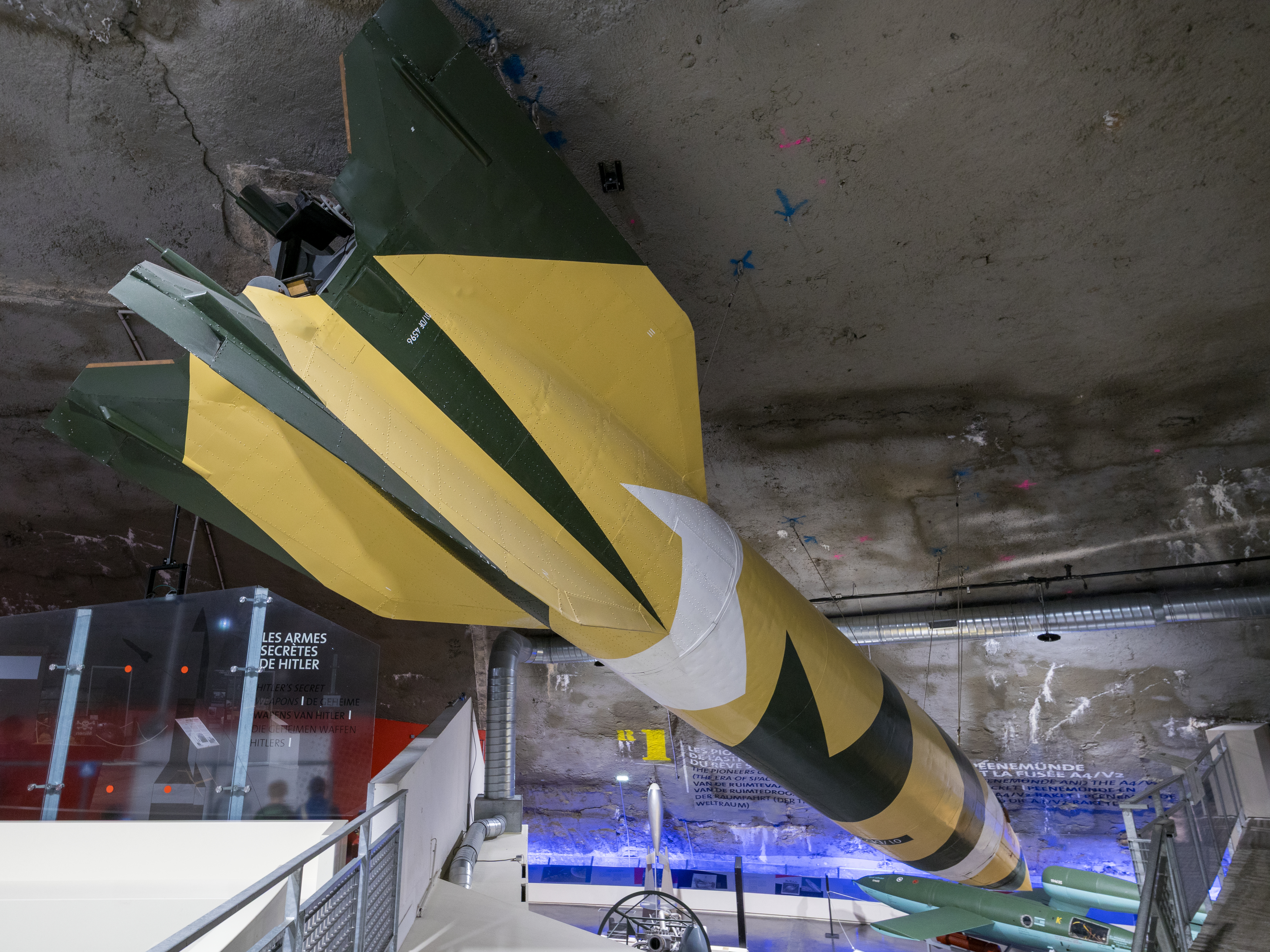
Original V-2 rocket and engine on display under the dome of La Coupole

Shortly after the Wizernes site had been captured in September 1944, Duncan Sandys, the head of the British "Crossbow Committee" investigating the V-weapons programme, ordered the constitution of a Technical Inter-Services Mission under Colonel Terence Sanders. It was given the task of investigating the sites at Mimoyecques, Siracourt, Watten, and Wizernes, collectively known to the Allies as the "Heavy Crossbow" sites. Sanders' report was submitted to the War Cabinet on 19 March 1945.

The purpose of the Wizernes site had been unclear prior to its capture but Sanders was able to deduce its connection with the V-2 from the dimensions of the complex and some intelligence information that his team had been able to retrieve. Sanders' report concluded that it was "an assembly site for long projectiles most conveniently handled and prepared in a vertical position". He conjectured the approximate length of the projectiles from the height of the Gustav and Gretchen tunnels, though he noted that there was some doubt about the height of the doors at the tunnel entrances. Segments of the doors had been recovered from a storage dump near Watten railway station but were incomplete. Judging from the size of the tunnel entrance, the maximum size of the projectile could have been between 17 metres (56 ft) and 24 metres (79 ft) in length and 4 metres (13 ft) in breadth. This was substantially larger than the V-2, which measured 14 metres (46 ft) long and 3.55 metres (11.6 ft) wide. Two witnesses interviewed by the Sanders team reported "an intention of firing a projectile 18 metres long". Sanders noted that "the dimensions of the site make it suitable for the A.4 (V-2) rocket, but the possibility of a new rocket up to half as long again as the A.4 and twice the weight cannot be ruled out." (Note: Although the V-2 rocket at 14 metres (46 ft) long could have been carried by a car through the Sanders-identified height, the A10 New York rocket design was too tall—even without a rail carrier—at 26 m (85 ft).) He concluded that much of the site was becoming unsafe due to the progressive collapse of timbering and recommended that the tunnels and workings under the dome should be destroyed to prevent subsequent accidents or misuse.

== Preservation ==
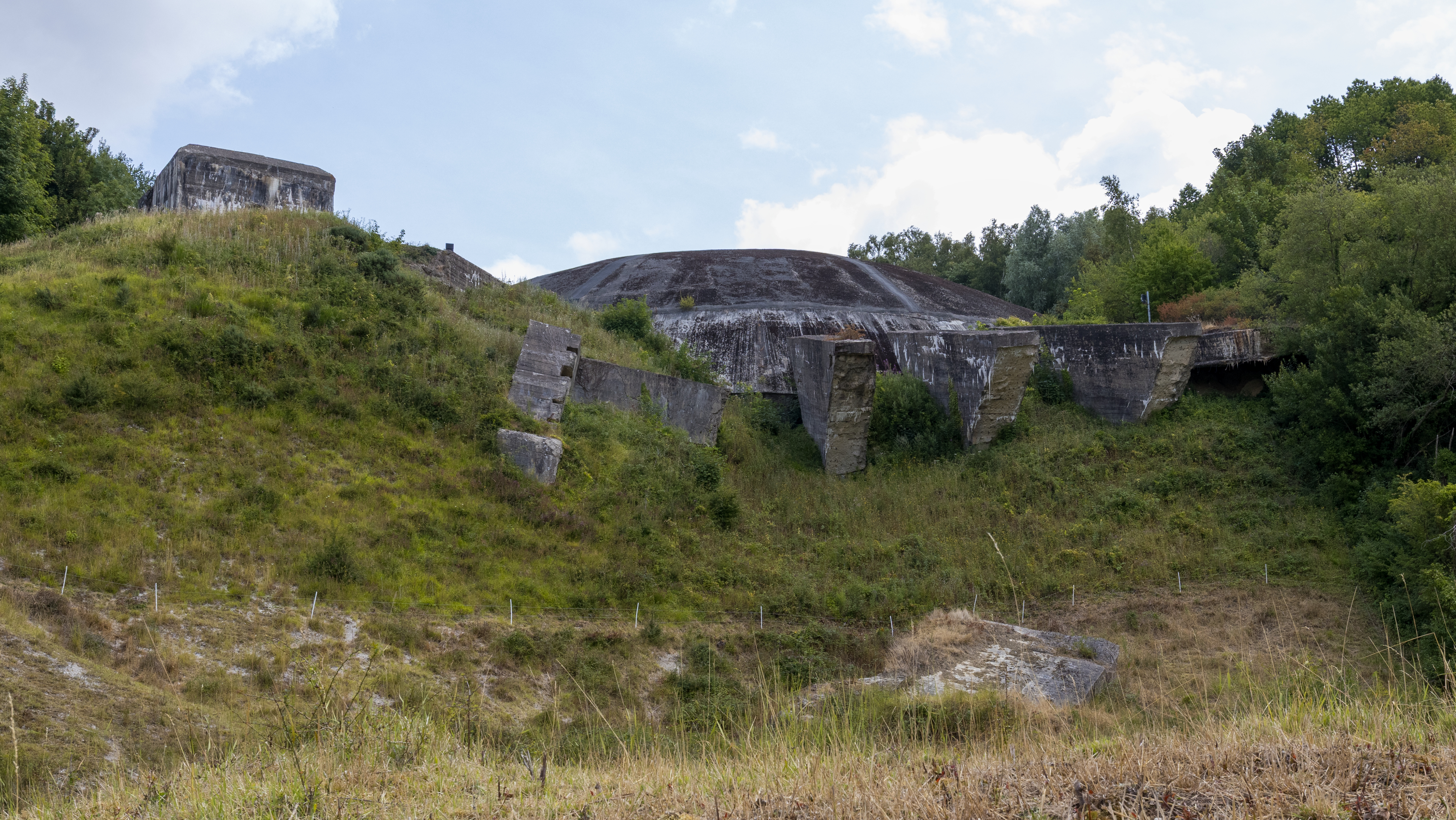
The dome

Entrance to the museum of La Coupole

The site reverted to private ownership after the war. As the quarry had long since been worked out, it was abandoned. The tunnels were not destroyed but were sealed off, though at some point they were reopened by local people and could be entered; the octagon remained sealed off with a ceiling-to-floor barricade. The quarry itself remained in almost the same condition as it had been in 1944, with sections of railway track still in place on the quarry floor. The hospital section remained relatively intact and was used by the local gendarmes as a shooting range.

In 1986, the Espace Naturel Régional in Lille earmarked 10 million francs to develop the site as a tourist attraction for the Nord-Pas-de-Calais region with the intention of establishing a World War II Museum there. The plan was publicised in a special open weekend on 20–21 June 1987, attended by over 20,000 people, in which the dome's designer Werner Flos met Professor Reginald Victor Jones, a surviving member of the "Crossbow Committee", at Wizernes. The Ida tunnel and side chambers were opened to the public and used for an audio-visual exhibition of the site's history.

Local historian Yves le Maner was charged with the task of developing the project while a feasibility study was conducted into the possibility of completing some of the original excavation work to make the site safe for public access. The plans were approved in 1993 and the site was purchased by the Commune de Helfaut. The following year, the Conseil Général du Pas-de-Calais acquired the site. The 69-million-franc project (£7.5 million at 1997 prices) was largely underwritten by the Conseil Général, which provided 35 million francs, with another 17 million coming from the regional council. The European Union provided a further 12 million, the French State provided 3 million and the Saint-Omer municipal administration funded the remaining 1 million francs; a number of private shareholders were also involved. The Societé d'Equipement du Pas-de-Calais was contracted to carry out the development work, which involved excavating a further two metres (six feet) beneath the dome, clearing out and completing the unfinished concreting of some of the tunnels, building an exhibition centre and car park in the quarry floor and installing a lift to carry visitors up from the octagon to the dome.

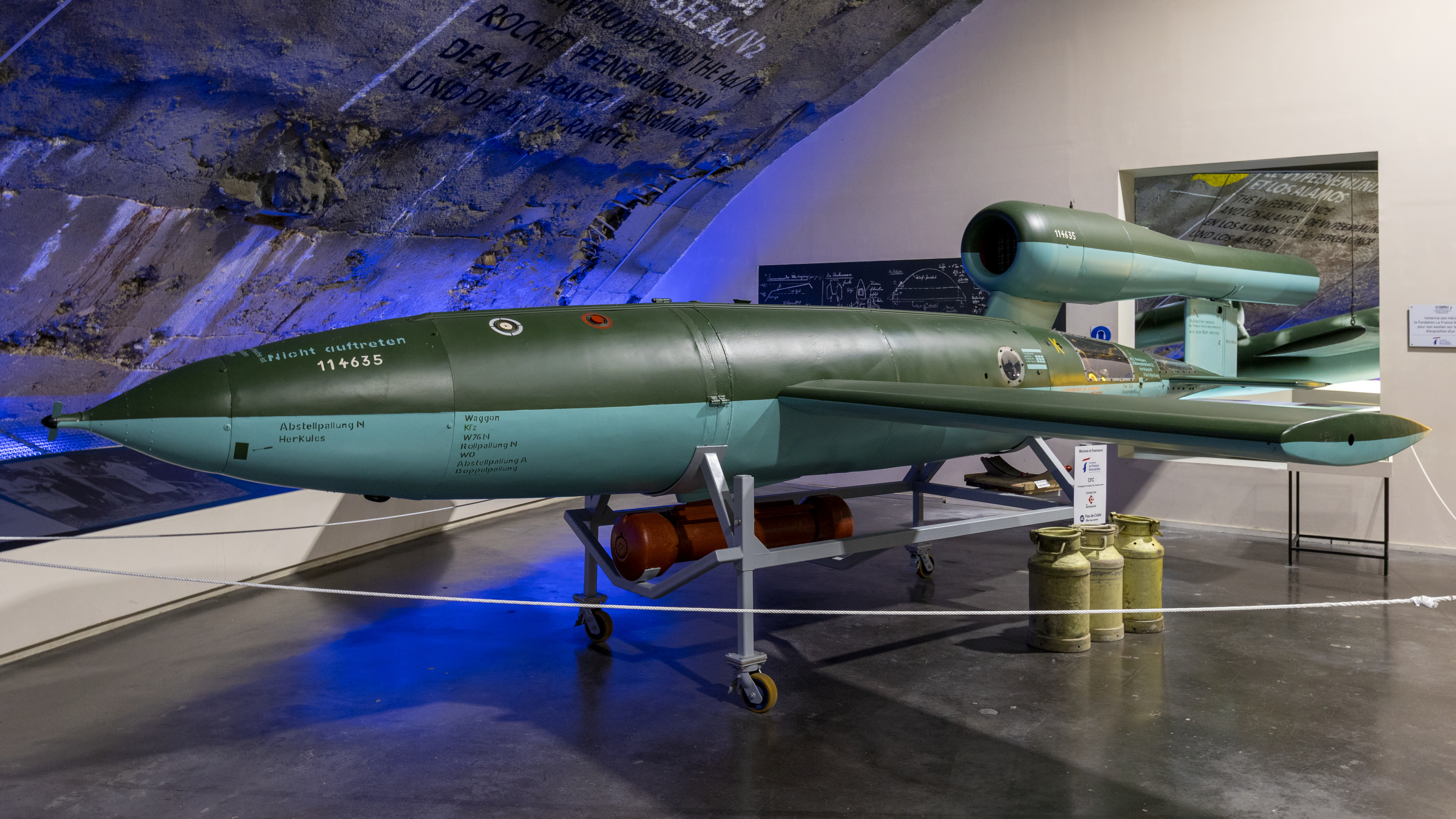
German V-1 flying bomb

The museum opened in May 1997. Visitors enter and leave through the Ida railway tunnel, though the rails have been removed and the floor levelled. Short branch tunnels lead off on either side; originally used for storage, they now display wartime objects. Headphone stands along the way present multi-lingual accounts of the construction and purpose of the facility. The tour continues along the Mathilde tunnel to reach a lift that has been installed to bring visitors up to the space beneath the dome, where the main exhibition area is located. Focusing on the story of the V-weapons, life in occupied France, and the conquest of space after the war, the tour presents audio-visual displays in English, French, Dutch and German. The museum houses a large number of original artifacts including a V-1 provided by London's Science Museum and a V-2 provided by the Smithsonian Institution, and incorporates a memorial to the 8,000 people who were shot in or deported from the Nord-Pas-de-Calais region during the war; computer terminals track the paths of several hundred of the deportees. In 2011, the museum welcomed 120,000 visitors. In July 2012, the museum opened a planetarium as part of Cerendac, a newly established Centre de ressources numériques pour le développement de l'accès à la connaissance (Resource Centre for the development of digital access to knowledge). The €6 million centre is funded by the Pas-de-Calais department, the Nord-Pas-de-Calais region, the French state, the European Union and the intercommunality of Saint-Omer. Since 2010, the museum has also managed the V-3 site of the Fortress of Mimoyecques.

== See also ==
- Blockhaus d'Éperlecques
- Fortress of Mimoyecques
