= Blockhaus d'Éperlecques =

Second World War bunker complex in Pas-de-Calais, France

Blockhaus d'Éperlecques Kraftwerk Nord West
- Forest of Éperlecques, near Watten (France)
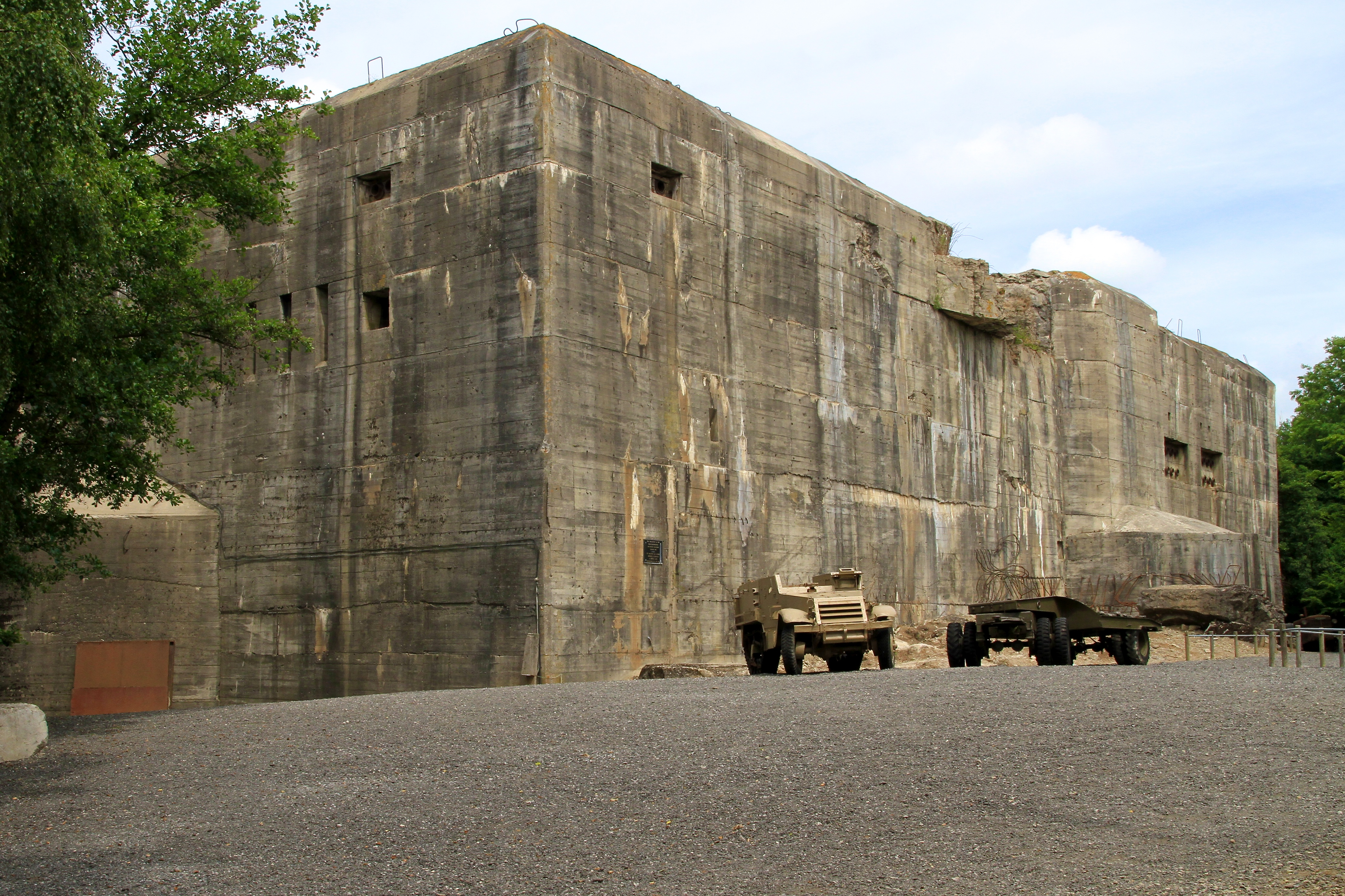
- View of the south side of the Blockhaus d'Éperlecques

Site information
- Type: Bunker
- Owner: Privately owned
- Open to the public: yes (protected by law)
- Condition: heavily damaged
- Website: www.leblockhaus.com

Location
- Coordinates: 50°49′43″N 2°11′01″E
- Height: 28 m (92 ft)

Site history
- Built: March–September 1943 (major work completed)
- Built by: Organisation Todt
- In use: never completed, captured September 1944
- Materials: 120,000 cubic metres ferrous concrete (planned)
- Battles/wars: Operation Crossbow
- Events: captured 4 September 1944

The Blockhaus d'Éperlecques (English: Bunker of Éperlecques, also referred to as "the Watten bunker" or simply "Watten") is a Second World War bunker, now part of a museum, near Saint-Omer in the northern Pas-de-Calais département of France, and only some 14.4 kilometers (8.9 miles) north-northwest from the more developed La Coupole V-2 launch facility, in the same general area.

The bunker, built by Nazi Germany under the codename Kraftwerk Nord West (Powerplant Northwest) between March 1943 and July 1944, was originally intended to be a launching facility for the V-2 (A-4) ballistic missile. It was designed to accommodate over 100 missiles at a time and to launch up to 36 daily.

The facility would have incorporated a liquid oxygen factory and a bomb-proof railway station to allow missiles and supplies to be delivered from production facilities in Germany. It was constructed using the labour of thousands of prisoners of war and forcibly conscripted workers used as slave labourers.

The bunker was never completed as a result of the repeated bombing by the British and United States air forces as part of Operation Crossbow against the German V-weapons programme. The attacks caused substantial damage and rendered the bunker unusable for its original purpose. Part of the bunker was subsequently completed for use as a liquid oxygen factory. It was captured by Allied forces at the start of September 1944, though its true purpose was not discovered by the Allies until after the war. V-2s were instead launched from Meillerwagen-based mobile batteries which were far less vulnerable to aerial attacks.

The bunker is preserved as part of a privately owned museum that presents the history of the site and the German V-weapons programme. It has been protected by the French state as a monument historique since 1986.

== Background ==
The A-4 ballistic missile (referred to as the V-2 from September 1944) was developed by the Germans between 1939 and 1944. It was regarded by Adolf Hitler as a Wunderwaffe (wonder weapon) that he believed to be capable of turning the tide of the war. Its operational deployment was restricted by several factors. Large supplies of cryogenic liquid oxygen (LOX) were required as the oxidizer to fuel the missiles. LOX evaporates rapidly, necessitating a source reasonably close to the firing site in order to minimise loss through evaporation. Germany and the occupied countries did not at that time have sufficient manufacturing capacity for the amount of LOX required for a full-scale A-4 campaign; the total production capacity in 1941 and 1942 was about 215 tons daily, but each A-4 launch required about 15 tons.

As the missile was intended for use against London and southern England, its operational range of 320 km (200 mi) meant that the launch sites had to be located fairly close to the English Channel or southern North Sea coasts, in northern France, Belgium or the western Netherlands. This was within easy reach of the Allied air forces, so any site would have to be able to resist or evade the expected aerial bombardments.

Various concepts were mooted for the A-4's deployment in a March 1942 study by Walter Dornberger, the head of the A-4 development project at the Peenemünde Army Research Center. He suggested that the missiles should be based in heavily defended fixed sites of a bunker-style design similar to the massive submarine pens then under construction in occupied France and Norway. The rockets could be stored in such sites, armed, fuelled from an on-site LOX production plant, and launched. This offered significant technical advantages; not only would the LOX loss be minimised, but the complex process of pre-launch testing would be simplified. A high rate of fire could be sustained as the facility could effectively operate like a production line, sending a steady flow of missiles to the launch pads.

The submarine pens and other Atlantic Wall fortifications had been built in 1940 and 1941, when the Germans had air superiority and could deter Allied air attacks. By 1942 this advantage had been lost to the United States Army Air Forces, which had begun deploying to England in May 1942, and a greatly expanded Royal Air Force. The German Army preferred an alternative approach which would use trailer-style mobile launch platforms called Meillerwagen accompanied by testing and fuelling equipment mounted on railway cars or trucks. Although this configuration was far less efficient and would have a much lower rate of fire, it would have the great advantage of presenting a much smaller target for the Allied air forces. The Army was not convinced that fixed bunkers could resist repeated air attacks and was particularly concerned about the vulnerability of the launch sites' road and rail links, which were essential for resupplying them with missiles and fuel.

In November 1942, Hitler and Minister of Munitions Albert Speer discussed possible launch configurations and examined models and plans of the proposed bunkers and mobile launchers. Hitler strongly preferred the bunker option, though he also gave the go-ahead for the production of mobile launchers. Two different bunker designs had been prepared: the B.III-2a design envisaged preparing the missile for launch inside the bunker, then transporting it outside to a launch pad, while the B.III-2b design would see the missile being elevated from within the bunker to a launch pad on the roof.

Speer gave orders that two bunkers were to be constructed by the Organisation Todt construction group to a "special fortification standard" (Sonderbaustärke), requiring a steel-reinforced concrete ceiling 5 m (16 ft) thick and walls 3.5 m (11 ft) thick. They would be built near the coasts opposite England, one on the Côte d'Opale near Boulogne-sur-Mer and the other on the Cotentin Peninsula near Cherbourg. Each would be capable of launching 36 missiles a day, would hold sufficient supplies of missiles and fuel to last three days, and would be manned by 250 troops.

== Design and location ==
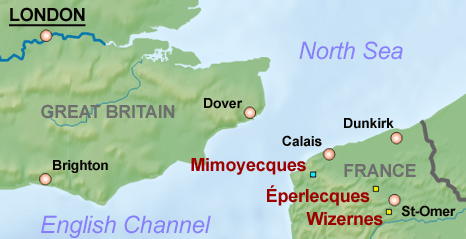
Map of the Pas-de-Calais and south-eastern England showing the location of Éperlecques and other major V-weapons sites

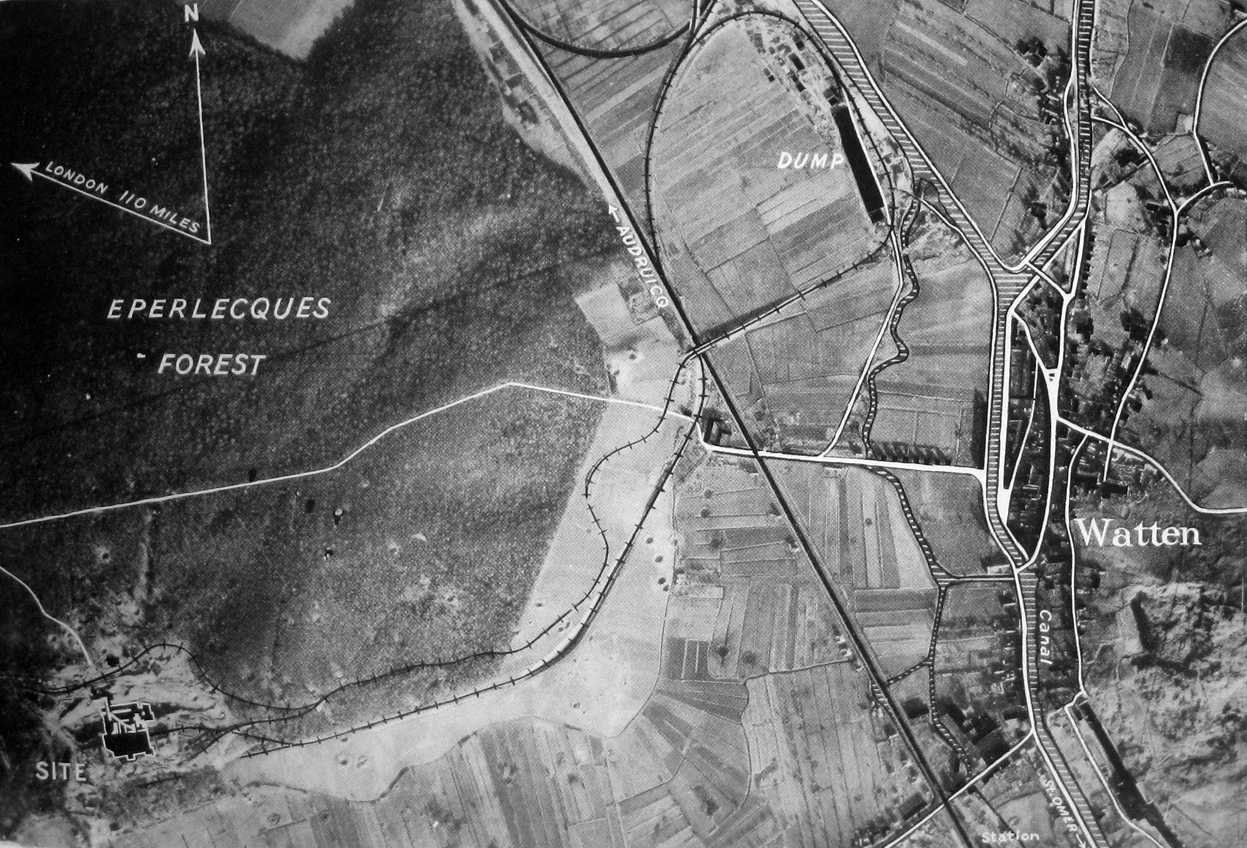
Annotated aerial view of the Watten–Éperlecques area.

In December 1942, Speer ordered Peenemünde officers and engineers (including Colonel Gerhard Stegmair, Dr Ernst Steinhoff and Lieutenant-Colonel Georg Thom) to tour the Artois region in northwest France and locate a suitable site for an A-4 launch facility. The site chosen was just to the west of the small town of Watten, in the Forest of Éperlecques, near Saint-Omer in the Pas-de-Calais department. It was given the cover name of Kraftwerk Nord West (Northwest Power Plant). By mid-February 1943 Dornberger decided that the bunker should include liquid oxygen production with five machines and a monthly capacity of 1500 tons.

The location was conveniently close to the main railway line between Calais and Saint-Omer, the canalised river Aa, main roads and electric grid lines. Situated 177 km (110 mi) from London, it was far enough inland to be safe from naval guns and it was sheltered to an extent by a ridge that rises to a height of 90 m (300 ft) to the north.

At nearby Saint-Omer, there was a major Luftwaffe base which was capable of providing air defence for the area. There were existing gravel and sand quarries as well as cement works in the vicinity, which would help with the enormous amount of material that would be needed for the construction works. The quantities required were very substantial indeed; 200,000 tons of concrete and 20,000 tons of steel would be required to build the facility. When US Army Major General Lewis H. Brereton inspected the site after it had been captured by the Allies, he described the bunker as "more extensive than any concrete constructions we have in the United States, with the possible exception of Boulder Dam."

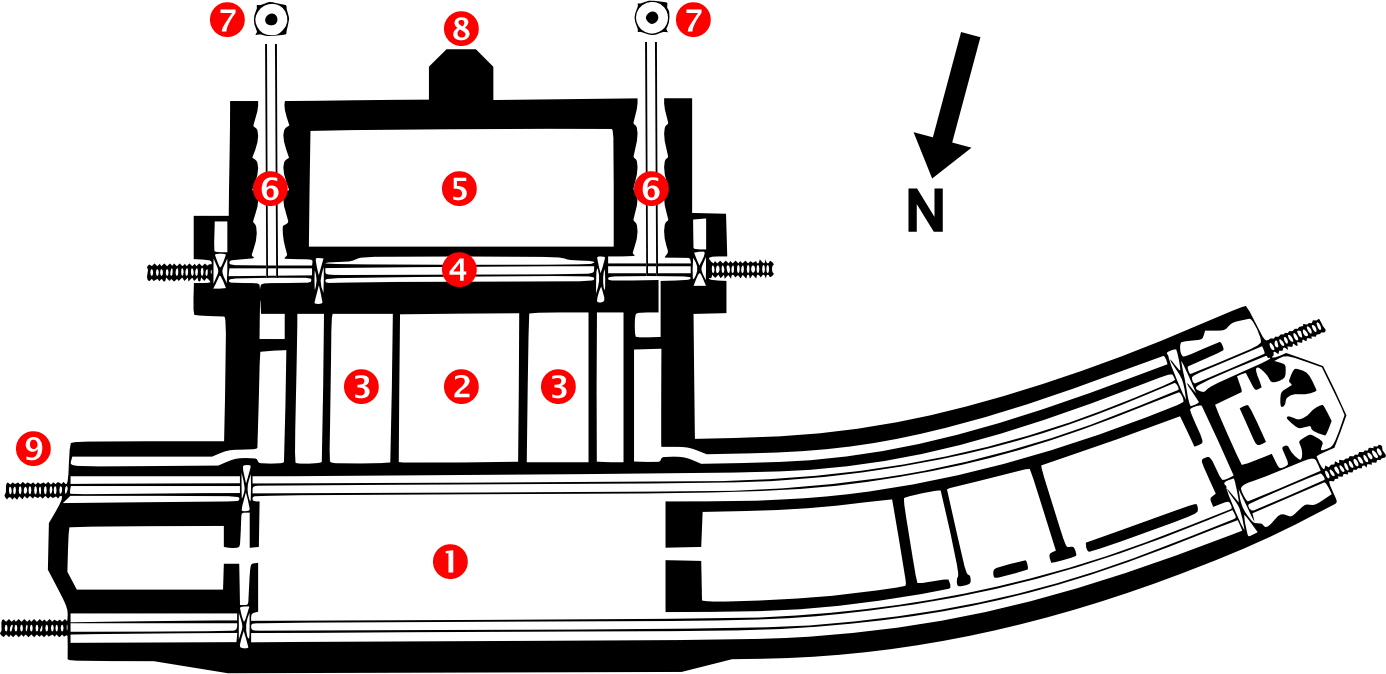
Diagram of the original planned layout of the Watten bunker: 1. Fortified train station for missile and supplies delivery; 2. Liquid oxygen storage; 3. transit halls; 4. Servicing hall where the missiles would be prepared for launch; 5. Liquid oxygen production plant; 6. transit halls lined with anti-blast chicanes, where missiles would be transported to the launch pads; 7. Launch pads; 8. Launch control centre; 9. Standard gauge rail link to Calais-Saint-Omer railway line

The Watten bunker was to be built to a design based on the B.III-2a bunker, though substantially larger. The Germans had originally planned to build LOX plants in the occupied West at Liège and at Stenay but the latter option was abandoned in favour of installing a LOX production facility within the Watten bunker.

The bunker consisted of three main elements. The main part of the building was a giant structure some 92 m (302 ft) wide and 28 m (92 ft) high, housing the LOX plant and a vault where missiles would be assembled and prepared. Its walls were up to 7 m (23 ft) thick and the bunker's working levels descended 6 m (20 ft) below ground. The plant would house five Heylandt compressors, each capable of producing about 10 tons of LOX per day. About 150 tons of LOX were to be stored in insulated tanks on-site. The facility was intended to store up to 108 missiles and enough fuel to supply three days' worth of launches. The Germans planned to fire up to 36 rockets a day from the site.

On the north side of the building was a fortified standard gauge railway station, linked to the main Calais-Saint-Omer line at Watten via a 1.2 km (0.75 mi) spur line. Missiles, warheads and other components would be shipped to the station and transported on trucks into the main area of the bunker. Here the rockets were to be assembled, raised into a vertical position and fuelled and armed. From the arming halls, they would be moved to either end of the building through pivoting doors 18 m (59 ft) high. They would exit through the south face of the building and would be moved on tracks to the launch pads. There were no doors on the exit portals so chicanes were installed in the exit passage to deflect the blast of rockets being launched from outside. Launches would be overseen from a command tower located in the centre of the south side of the bunker, overlooking the launch pads.

To the north of the bunker, the Germans erected a bomb-proof power station with a 2,000 hp (1.5 MW) generating capacity. The site was initially powered from the main electricity grid, but it was intended that it would have its own independent power source to minimise the likelihood of disruption. Also associated with the Watten complex was a radar tracking site at Prédefin, 29 km (18 mi) south of Saint-Omer. A Giant Würzburg radar system was installed there to follow the trajectories of V-2s being launched from Watten. The intention was to follow the trajectory for as long as possible so that the accuracy of the missile launches could be determined.

== Construction ==
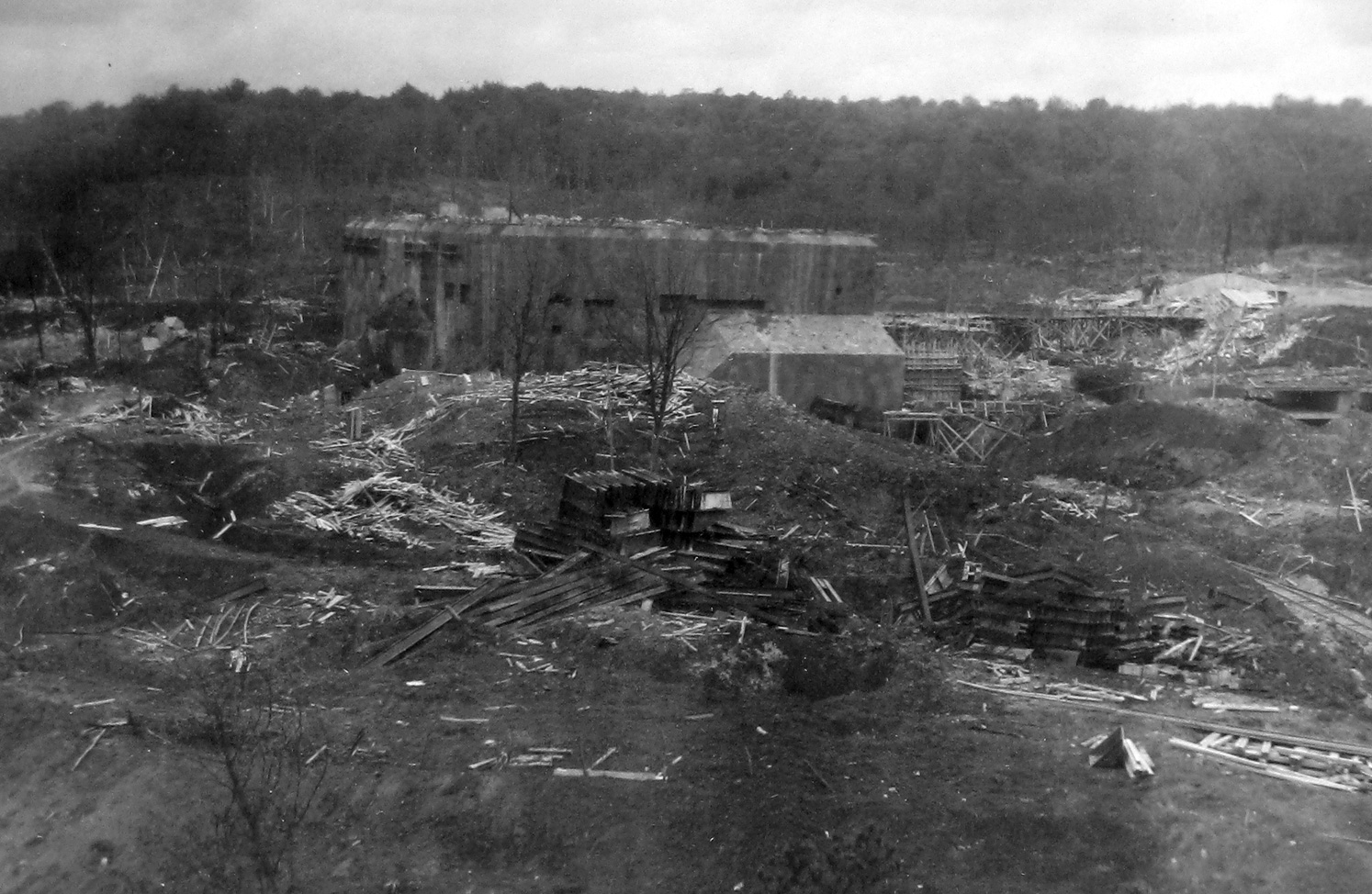
Construction works at the Watten site, as seen by an RAF ultra-low-level reconnaissance flight at an altitude of only 30 m (98 ft) on 23 July 1944

The site was designed in January and February 1943 by engineers from the Peenemünde research facility and the Organisation Todt. On 25 March 1943 the construction plans were presented to Hitler, who immediately gave the go-ahead for the project to begin. The construction firm Holzman & Polanski was awarded the contract and 6,000 workers from Building Battalion 434 started construction that same month using plans by Franz Xaver Dorsch, Construction Director at the Organisation Todt. It was envisaged that the structure would be ready by the end of July 1943, though not its wiring and plant, and it was intended that it would be fully operational by 1 November 1943.

The workforce consisted of a mixture of German specialists and forcibly conscripted Frenchmen from the Service du Travail Obligatoire (STO). They were supplemented by Belgian, Dutch, French, Polish, Czech and Soviet prisoners of war and civilian conscripts, who were used as slave labour. The labour force also included many French political prisoners and Spanish Republicans who had fled to France after General Franco's victory in the Spanish Civil War but had then been interned by the invading Germans. The non-German workers lived in two camps officially known as Organisation Todt Watten Zwangsarbeitslager 62 (Forced Labour Camp 62) about 2 km (1.2 mi) distant from the site, near the village of Éperlecques.

The camps were guarded by the French civil police with the assistance of Belgian and Dutch Nazis and Russian POWs who had volunteered for guard duty. Although escape attempts were punished by immediate execution, there were up to three escapes daily with external assistance. The commandant of the camp is said to have complained that it would have been easier to "guard a sack of fleas". Over 35,000 foreign workers passed through the camps during the period in which they were operational.

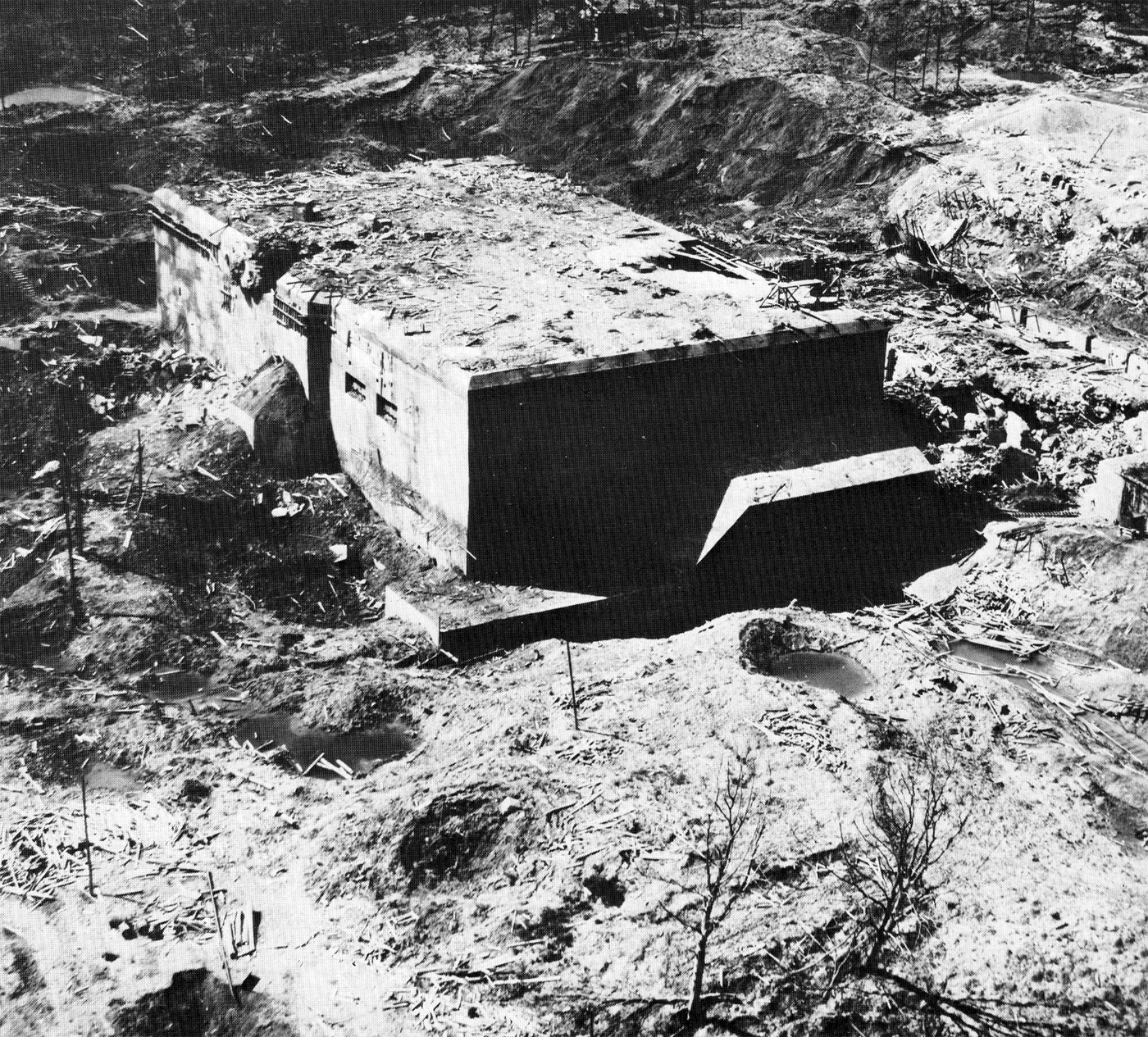
Aerial view of the bunker, 1944 or 1945

The labourers worked in 12-hour shifts of 3,000–4,000 men, with three 20-minute breaks during each shift. The work continued around the clock, seven days a week, under giant floodlights during the night. The living and working conditions were extremely harsh, especially for the political prisoners and the eastern Europeans, who were given especially punitive treatment due to their status as the most expendable members of the workforce. For the non-German workers, falling ill or being unable to work through injury was the equivalent of a death sentence, as they would either be left to die or be transported back to the concentration camps from which they had been brought. A German commission that inspected the labour camps in the area in late 1943 commented: "The Eastern [European] worker is very tough. He works at his job until he falls flat on his face in the mire, and all that is left for the doctor to do is to issue the death certificate."

A large supply dump was established at Watten next to the River Aa. This site was eventually used to store material required for all the V-weapon sites in the Saint-Omer area. Building materials were brought there by barges and trains where they were unloaded onto a Decauville narrow-gauge railway for transportation to the construction site, where concrete mixers operated day and night. A 90 kV power line running to a transformer at Holque north of Watten provided electricity. An old quarry at Wizernes codenamed Schotterwerk Nordwest (Gravel Quarry Northwest), some 12 km (7.5 mi) south of Watten, was also converted into a storage dump to supply the Watten facility.

== Discovery and Allied attacks ==
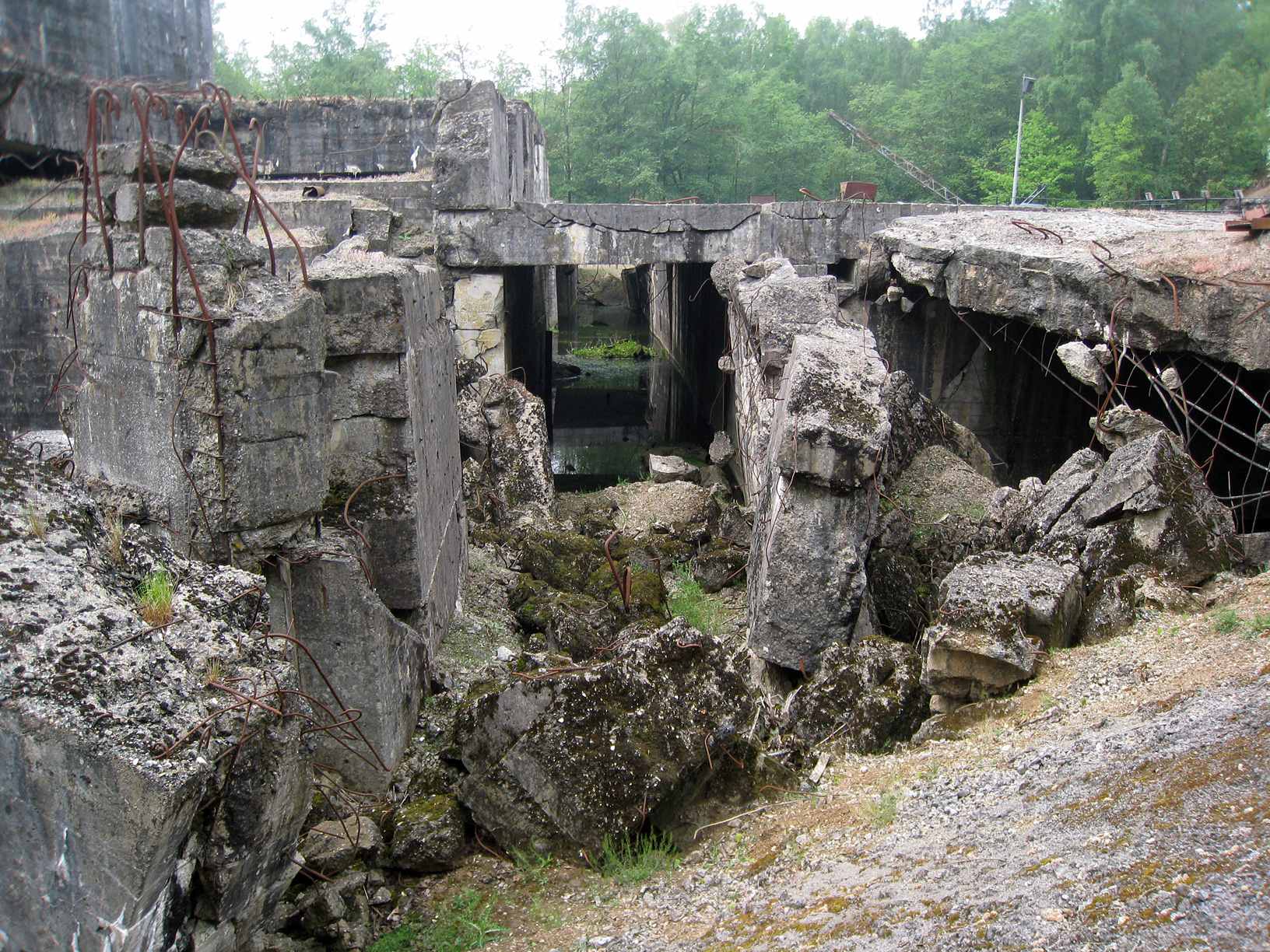
The wrecked fortified train station on the north side of the bunker, 2011

In early April 1943, an Allied agent reported "enormous trenches" being excavated at the Watten site, and on 16 May 1943 an RAF reconnaissance mission led to Allied photographic interpreters noticing unidentified activity there. Other large facilities were observed to be under construction elsewhere in the Pas-de-Calais. The purpose of the construction works was very unclear; Lord Cherwell, Winston Churchill's scientific adviser, admitted that he had little idea what "these very large structures similar to gun emplacements" were but he believed that "if it is worth the enemy's while to go to all the trouble of building them it would seem worth ours to destroy them."

At the end of May, the British Chiefs of Staff ordered that aerial attacks be carried out against the so-called "heavy sites" being built by the Germans. On 6 August, Duncan Sandys, who headed a high-level Cabinet committee to coordinate the British defence against the German V-weapons, recommended that the Watten site should also be attacked because of the progress being made in its construction. The British Chiefs of Staff noted that a daylight attack by US bombers was under consideration but they raised objections to the proposal, as the Air Staff thought that Watten had nothing to do with rockets, suggesting that instead it might be merely a "protected operations room".

The timing of the first raid was influenced by advice given by Sir Malcolm McAlpine, the chairman of the construction company Sir Robert McAlpine, who suggested that the Watten site should be attacked while the concrete was still setting. On 27 August 1943, 187 B-17 Flying Fortresses of the US 8th Air Force attacked the site with devastating effect. The fortified train station on the north side of the bunker was especially badly damaged, as concrete had just been poured there. Dornberger later wrote that following the attack the site was "a desolate heap of concrete, steel, props and planking. The concrete hardened. After a few days the shelter was beyond saving. All we could do was roof in a part and use it for other work." The bombing killed and injured hundreds of the slave workers on site; although the Allies had sought to avoid casualties by timing the raid with what they thought was a change of shifts, the shift pattern had been changed by the Germans at the last minute to achieve the day's work quota.

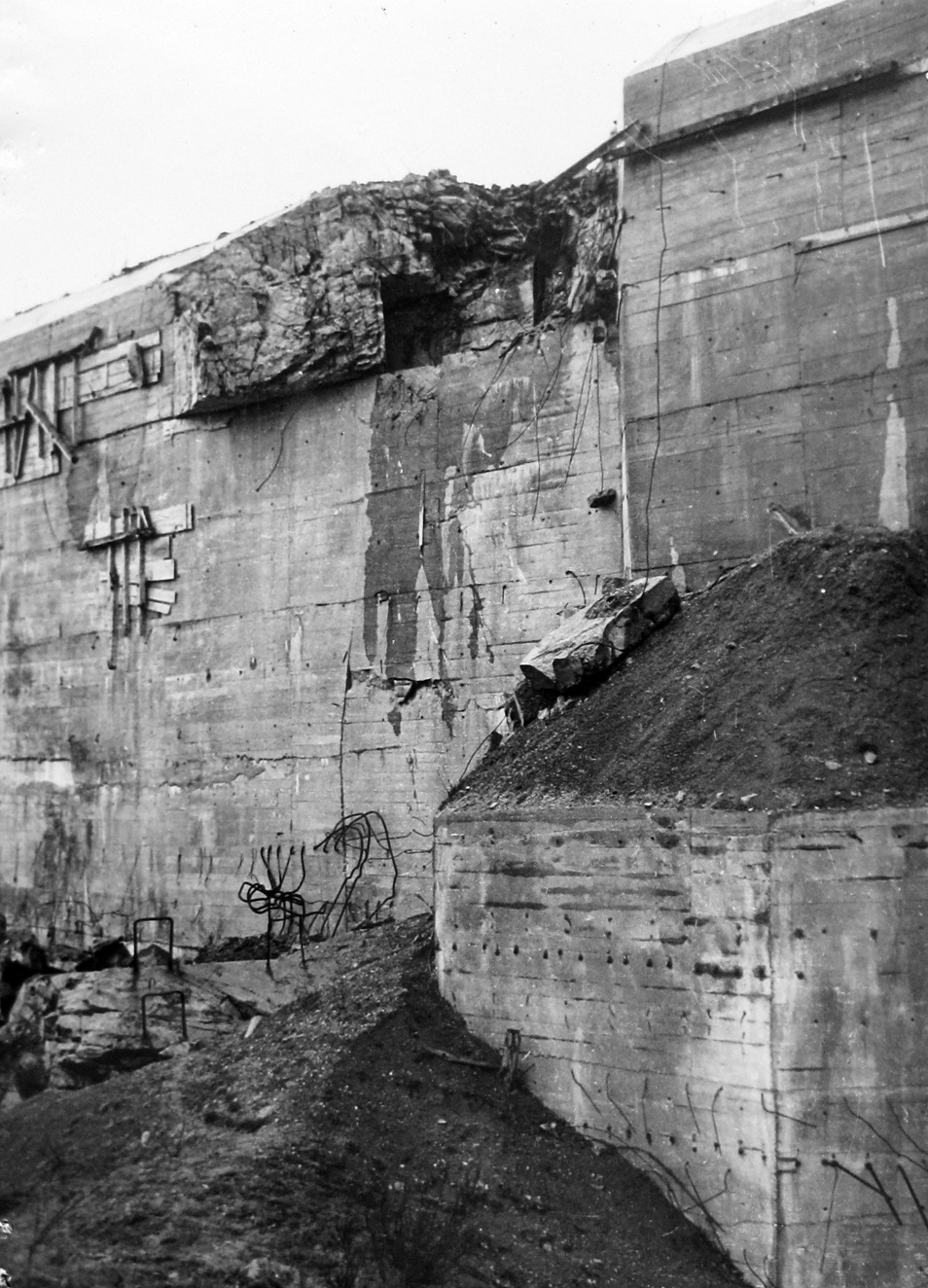
Damage caused by a Tallboy bomb to the roof on the south side of the bunker, photographed after the war in 1951

Only 35% of the Watten bunker had been completed by this time. It was clearly no longer possible to use it as a launch site, but the Germans still needed LOX production facilities to supply V-2 sites elsewhere. After surveying the site in September and October 1943, Organisation Todt engineers determined that the northern part of the facility was irretrievably damaged but decided to focus on completing the southern part to serve as a LOX factory.

One of OT's engineers, Werner Flos, came up with an idea to protect the bunker from bombardment by building it up from the roof first. This was done by initially constructing a concrete plate, flat on the ground, which was 5 m (16 ft) thick and weighed 37,000 tons. It was incrementally raised by hydraulic jacks and then supported by walls which were built underneath it as it was raised, becoming the roof. The resulting concrete cavern was intended to be used by the Germans as a bombproof liquid oxygen factory. The thickness of the roof was chosen on the assumption that Allied bombs were incapable of penetrating such a depth of concrete; the Germans, however, were unaware of the British development of earthquake bombs.

The Germans' main focus of attention switched instead to Schotterwerk Nordwest, the former quarry at nearby Wizernes, where work had been ongoing to build a bombproof V-2 storage facility. This project was expanded to turn the quarry into a fixed launch facility. Plans were put into effect to build a huge concrete dome – now open to the public as the museum of La Coupole – under which missiles would be fuelled and armed in a network of tunnels before being transported outside for launching. The Allies carried out further heavy bombing against both the Watten and Wizernes sites with little initial effect on the buildings themselves, although the rail and road network around them was systematically destroyed.

By the time of the D-Day landings, the foundations for five machines were finished and three were installed. On 1 July Dornberger ordered the removal of the machines. On 3 July 1944, Oberkommando West gave permission to stop construction at both sites, which had been so disrupted by bombing that work could no longer proceed. Three days later an Allied raid succeeded in wrecking the interior of the Watten bunker with a Tallboy bomb that brought down part of the roof. Finally, on 18 July 1944, Hitler decreed that plans for launching missiles from bunkers need no longer be pursued. Dornberger's staff subsequently decided to continue minor construction at Watten "for deception purposes". The site itself was now useless, as the Germans recognised when they wryly codenamed it Concrete Lump.

The Watten site was captured on 4 September 1944 by Canadian forces. The Germans had evacuated it a few days earlier and removed the pumps which kept the cavernous basement free from water; not long afterwards it began to flood. This made a substantial amount of the bunker inaccessible to the Allies.

=== Air raids ===
Éperlecque/Watten World War II attacks
Date	Mission
27 August 1943	VIII Bomber Command Mission 87/11 Group RAF Ramrod S.8: 187 Boeing B-17 Flying Fortresses bombed Watten at 1846–1941 hours, dropping 368 2,000 lb (910 kg) bombs. The site was thought to be a V-1 flying bomb facility at the time and crews were briefed on an 'aeronautical facilities' mission with instructions to bomb, from low level, the freshly poured concrete beginning to harden. The bombing caused the still-wet cement to solidify into a mess that was beyond repair. Allied losses were two Flying Fortresses lost to flak, one lost to Bf 109 fighters, one damaged by flak crash-landed in the UK. From the escorting force, one USAAF Republic P-47 Thunderbolt failed to return, two pilots from No. 41 Squadron RAF were shot down and captured and two pilots from No. 341 Squadron RAF including René Mouchotte were killed in action.
30 August 1943	VIII Air Support Command Mission 38/11 Group RAF Ramrod S.14: 24 North American B-25 Mitchell, 18 Lockheed Venturas, and 36 Martin B-26 Marauder medium bombers attacked Watten, described as an "ammunition dump at Éperlecques" at 1859 hours, dropping 49 tons of bombs. One No. 180 Squadron bomber was lost to flak with two of the crew killed. Fourteen other bombers were damaged by flak.
7 September 1943	VIII Bomber Command Mission 92: 58 B-17s bombed Watten, dropping 116 tons of bombs between 0820 and 0854 hours.
2 February 1944	Mission 205: 95 of 110 Consolidated B-24 Liberators, escorted by 183 Republic P-47 Thunderbolts, hit the V-weapon sites at Siracourt and Watten.
8 February 1944	Mission 214: 110 B-24s bombed the V-weapon sites at Siracourt and Watten, dropping 364 tons of bombs. More than 200 B-26s returned during the morning to carry out follow-up attacks.
19 March 1944	Mission 266: 117 of 129 B-17s bombed Watten, Wizernes and Mimoyecques. A follow-up attack by 65 Douglas A-20 Havoc light bombers was carried out the same afternoon.
21 March 1944	56 B-24s bombed Watten, but bad weather forced the recall of all the B-26s sent to join the raid.
26 March 1944	500 heavy bombers of the 8th Air Force attacked a total of 16 V-weapon sites in northern France, including Watten, dropping 1,271 tons of bombs. Allied losses were four B-17s and one B-24; a further 236 bombers were damaged by enemy fire.
29 March 1944	77 B-24s were sent to attack Watten but equipment malfunctions and navigational problems meant that only 31 aircraft succeeded in bombing the target.
6 April 1944	Five B-24 Liberator groups of the USAAF 2d Bombardment Division carried out an attack against Watten but bad weather prevented all but 12 aircraft from carrying out their attack.
18 April 1944	USAAF heavy bombers attacked Watten.
19 April 1944	27 B-24s attacked Watten during the afternoon.
1 May 1944	More than 500 USAAF heavy bombers were sent to attack V-weapons sites in the Pas-de-Calais, but bad weather forced most to abort. 129 succeeded in attacking Watten and Mimoyecques.
30 May 1944	USAAF heavy bombers attacked Watten and Siracourt.
16/17 June 1944	236 RAF Lancasters, 149 Halifaxes with target marking by 20 Oboe-equipped Mosquitos attacked V-weapon sites in the Pas-de-Calais, including Watten, which was attacked with Tallboy earthquake bombs for the first time.
18 June 1944	Mission 421: 58 B-17s bombed Watten.
18/19 June 1944	10 Mosquitos attacked Watten in a period of bad weather. 9 dropped bombs, but the results are unclear. No aircraft were lost.
19 June 1944	No. 617 Squadron RAF attacked Watten with 19 Lancasters led by 2 Mosquitos; 9 Pathfinder Mosquitos of 8 Group provided preliminary marking. However, the weather conditions were too difficult for accurate bombing and the nearest Tallboy impact missed the target by 50 yd (46 m).
6 July 1944	314 Halifaxes, 210 Lancasters, 26 Mosquitos, with Leonard Cheshire in a Mustang fighter marking, attacked five V-weapon targets in the Pas-de-Calais, including Watten. The bunker was penetrated and severely damaged by a Tallboy bomb.
25 July 1944	81 Lancasters and 11 Mosquitos of 5 and 8 Groups, with "Willie" Tait marking (having succeeded Cheshire), attacked Watten and two other launch sites with Tallboy bombs.
4 August 1944	The first Operation Aphrodite mission: four BQ-7s (remotely controlled B-17s) loaded with explosives targeted Watten and other V-weapon sites in the Pas-de-Calais area but missed their targets.
6 August 1944	Two more BQ-7s were launched against Watten but had little effect.
25 August 1944	87 Halifaxes, 2 Lancasters, 5 Mosquitos, attacked Watten.

== Subsequent investigations and utilisation ==
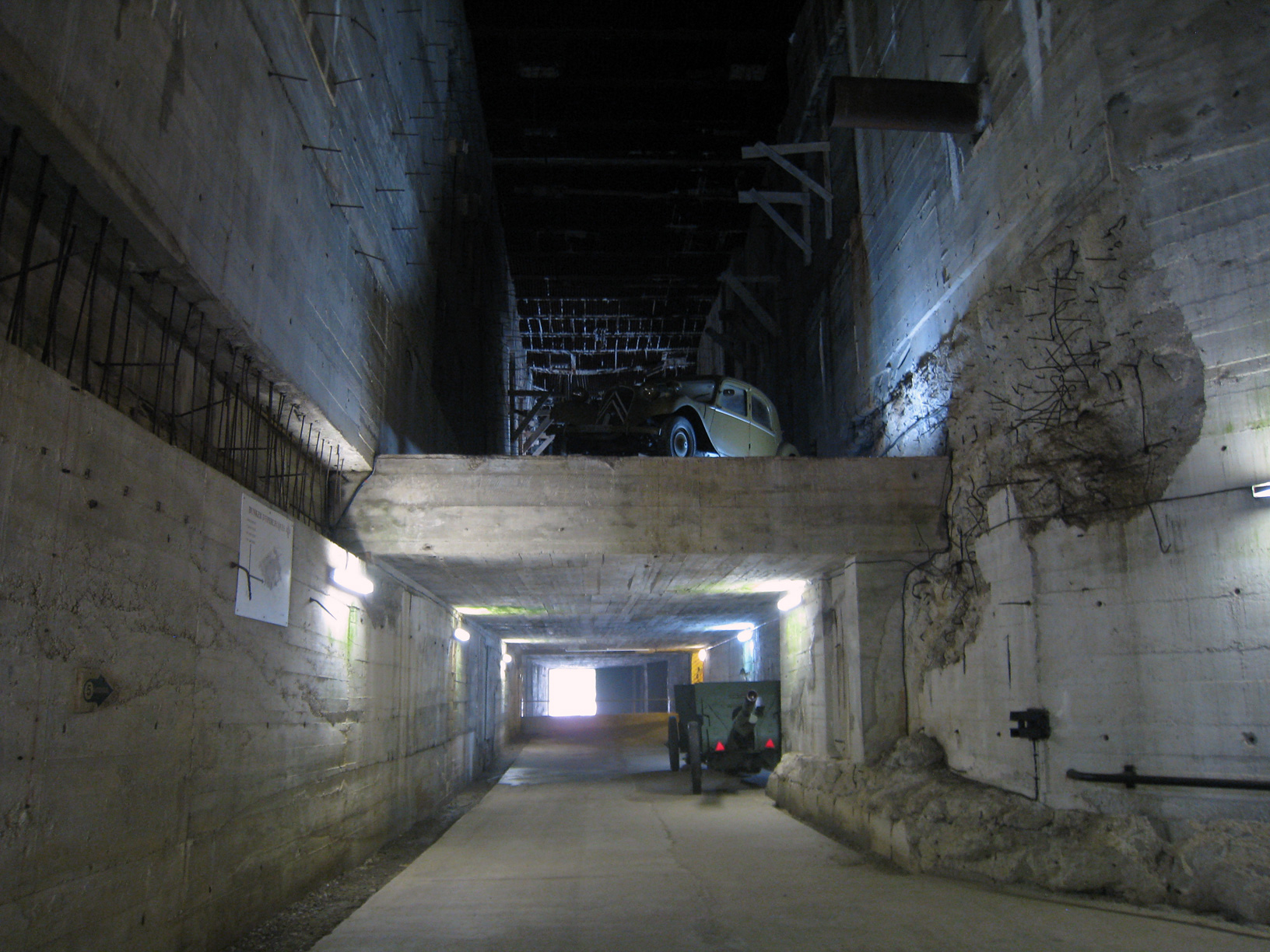
Interior of the 16 m (52 ft)-high servicing hall. V-2s would have been moved through here en route to the launch pads. The floor level has been raised in recent years to prevent flooding; it would originally have held a railway line.

The bunker was inspected on 10 September 1944 by the French atomic scientist Frédéric Joliot-Curie, accompanied by Sandys. Following the visit, Sandys ordered a Technical Inter-Services Mission under Colonel T.R.B. Sanders to investigate the sites at Mimoyecques, Siracourt, Watten, and Wizernes, collectively known to the Allies as the "Heavy Crossbow" sites. Sanders' report was submitted to the War Cabinet on 19 March 1945.

Despite the capture of Watten, it was still not known at this time what the site had been intended for. Sanders noted that "the purpose of the structures was never known throughout the period of intensive reconnaissance and attack". Based on the discovery of large aluminium tanks installed in the main part of the bunker, he opined that the Germans had intended to use it as a factory for the production of hydrogen peroxide for use in the fuelling of V-1 and V-2 missiles. He ruled out the possibility that it could have been used for LOX production and concluded, erroneously, that "the site had no offensive role." He recommended that (unlike the Mimoyecques and Wizernes sites) the Watten bunker presented no threat to the UK's security and "there is thus no imperative need, on that account, to ensure the destruction of the workings."

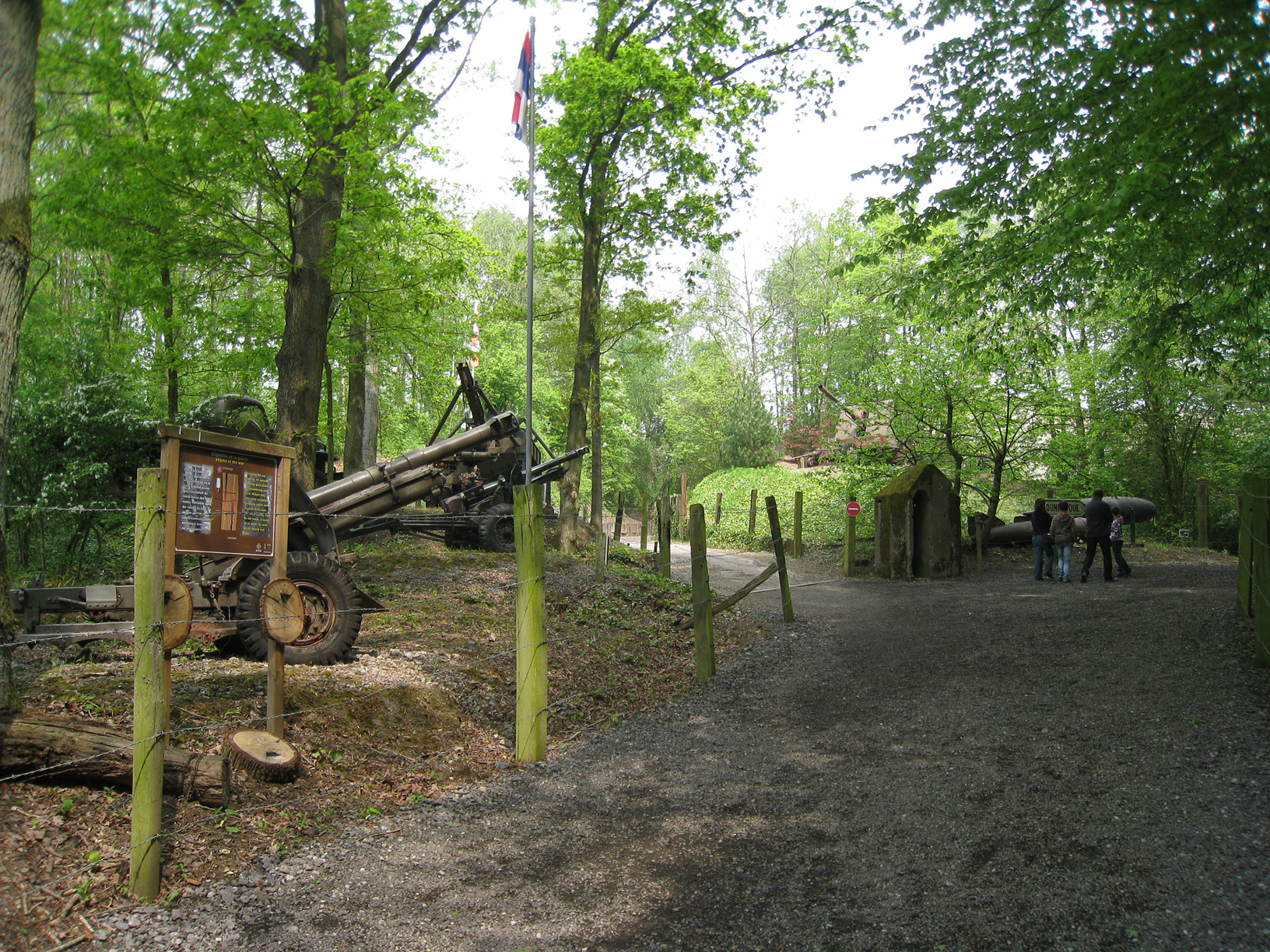
Exhibits of wartime military equipment in the forest around the Blockhaus d'Éperlecques

The bunker was targeted again by the Allies in February 1945, this time to test the newly developed CP/RA Disney bomb – a 4,500 lb (2,000 kg) concrete-piercing rocket-assisted bomb designed to double the normal impact velocity, and thereby increase the penetration, of the projectile. The site had been chosen for testing purposes in October 1944 as it had the largest accessible interior area of the targets under consideration and was furthest from an inhabited town.

On 3 February 1945, a B-17 of the US Eighth Air Force dropped a Disney bomb on the Watten bunker and scored a hit over the wall section, but the results were inconclusive and the Air Force was not able to determine how well the bomb had penetrated the concrete. Although Disney bombs were used operationally on a number of occasions, the weapon's introduction came too late to be of any significance in the war effort. In January 2009 the body of the Disney bomb was extracted from the roof, where it had embedded itself.

== Preservation ==
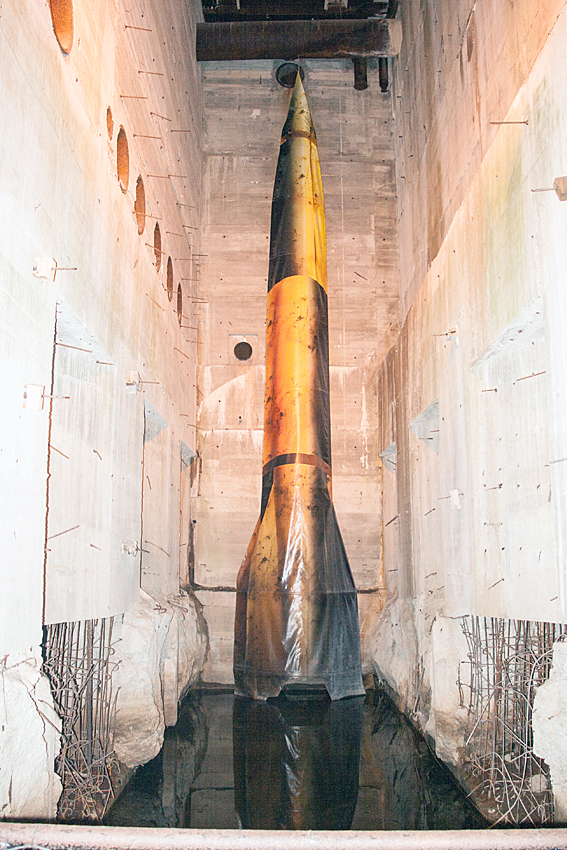
Impression of a V2 in the assembly hall at Éperlecques

The Watten bunker was inspected again on 20 June 1951 by an Anglo-French commission to determine whether it was capable of being reused for military purposes. The British Assistant Military Attaché, Major W.C. Morgan, reported to the Director of Military Intelligence at the War Office that the main part of the bunker had not been significantly damaged by bombing and that although it was flooded, if it was patched and drained "the building could be quickly made ready to receive oxygen liquifying plant machinery, or for any other purpose requiring a large and practically bomb-proof building."

On February 5, 1953, the French army decided to retain the bunker’s military function, converting it into a storage facility for equipment, barracks for troops, or shelters for the public. No further military use was made of the bunker and the land on which it stands reverted to private ownership.

As early as 1952, local businessman Xavier de Mégille expressed interest in purchasing several small bunkers surrounding the main bunker. This private initiative took on a new dimension some twenty years later, when the old bunker, which had in turn been abandoned by the French army, became his property in 1973 and decided to redevelop the site. In 1973, the bunker was opened to the public for the first time under the name of Le Blockhaus d'Éperlecques. The ownership was taken over by his son Hubert de Mégille in the mid-1980s and on 3 September 1986 the French state declared it a monument historique. The area around the bunker has been re-forested, though it is still heavily scarred by bomb craters, and various items of Second World War military equipment (including a V-1 on a launch ramp) are on display alongside paths around the site. An open-air trail leads to and around the bunker with interpretative signs posted at various points to tell the story of the site and the German V-weapons programme. In 2009, the museum welcomed 45,000 visitors.

== See also ==
- Fortress of Mimoyecques
- La Coupole
