= Hallines =

Hallines Haneline
- Commune
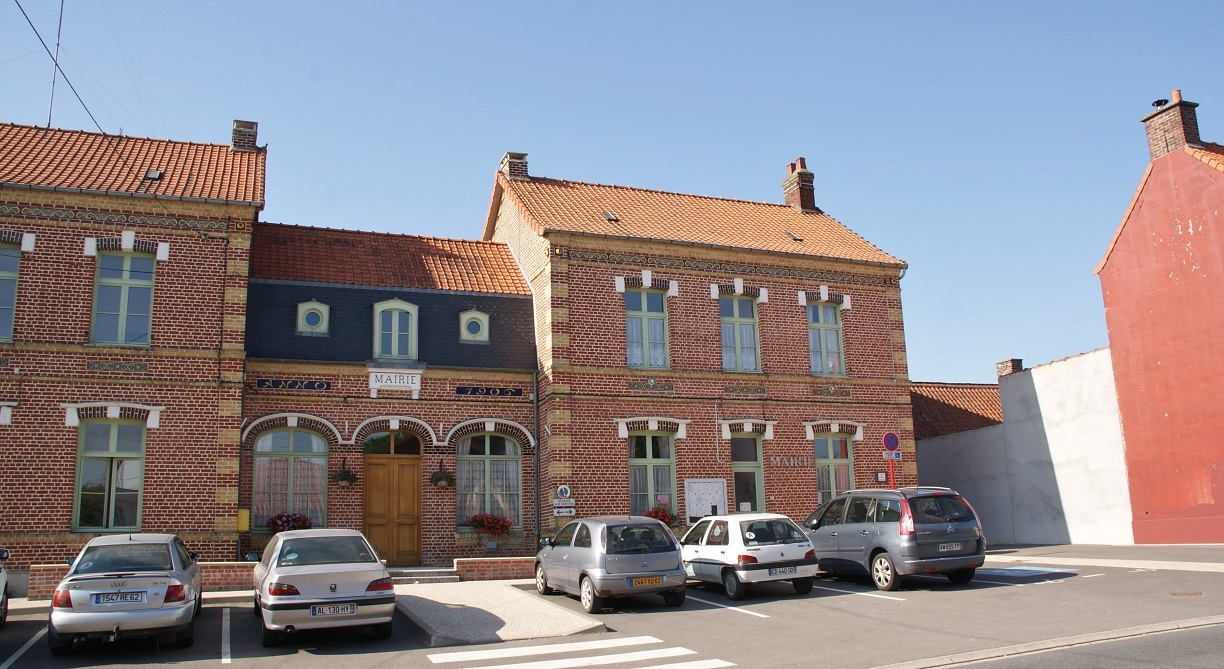
- The town hall of Hallines

- Coat of arms
- Location of Hallines
- Location within France Location within Hauts-de-France
- Coordinates: 50°42′34″N 2°12′39″E
- Country: France
- Region: Hauts-de-France
- Department: Pas-de-Calais
- Arrondissement: Saint-Omer
- Canton: Longuenesse
- Intercommunality: Pays de Saint-Omer

Government
  - Mayor (2021–2026): Christine Seillier
- Area^{1}: 5.72 km^{2} (2.21 sq mi)
- Elevation: 30 m (98 ft)
- Highest elevation: 123 m (404 ft)
- Lowest elevation: 22 m (72 ft)
- Population (2023): 1,196
  - Density: 209/km^{2} (542/sq mi)
- Time zone: UTC+01:00 (CET)
  - Summer (DST): UTC+02:00 (CEST)
- INSEE/Postal code: 62403 /62570
- ^{1} French Land Register data, which excludes lakes, ponds, glaciers > 1 km^{2} (0.386 sq mi or 247 acres) and river estuaries.

Hallines (French pronunciation: [alin]; West Flemish: Haneline) is a commune in the Pas-de-Calais department in the Hauts-de-France region of France.

== Geography ==
A village situated 4 miles (6 km) south of Saint-Omer, on the D211 road, just a few yards from the A26 autoroute.

== Population ==
Historical population
Year	Pop.	±% p.a.
1968	979	—
1975	1,201	+2.96%
1982	1,239	+0.45%
1990	1,396	+1.50%
1999	1,396	+0.00%
2007	1,365	−0.28%
2012	1,251	−1.73%
2017	1,195	−0.91%
2023	1,196	+0.01%
Source: INSEE

== Places of interest ==
- The church of St.Martin, rebuilt in the 19th century.
- The château, dating from the nineteenth century.

== See also ==
- Communes of the Pas-de-Calais department
