= Canton of Longuenesse =

Coordinates: 50.74°N 2.24°E

The canton of Longuenesse is an administrative division of the Pas-de-Calais department, in northern France. It was created at the French canton reorganisation which came into effect in March 2015. Its seat is in Longuenesse.

It consists of the following communes:

1. Arques
2. Blendecques
3. Campagne-lès-Wardrecques
4. Hallines
5. Helfaut
6. Longuenesse
7. Wizernes
