= Blendecques =

Blendecques Blendeke
- Commune
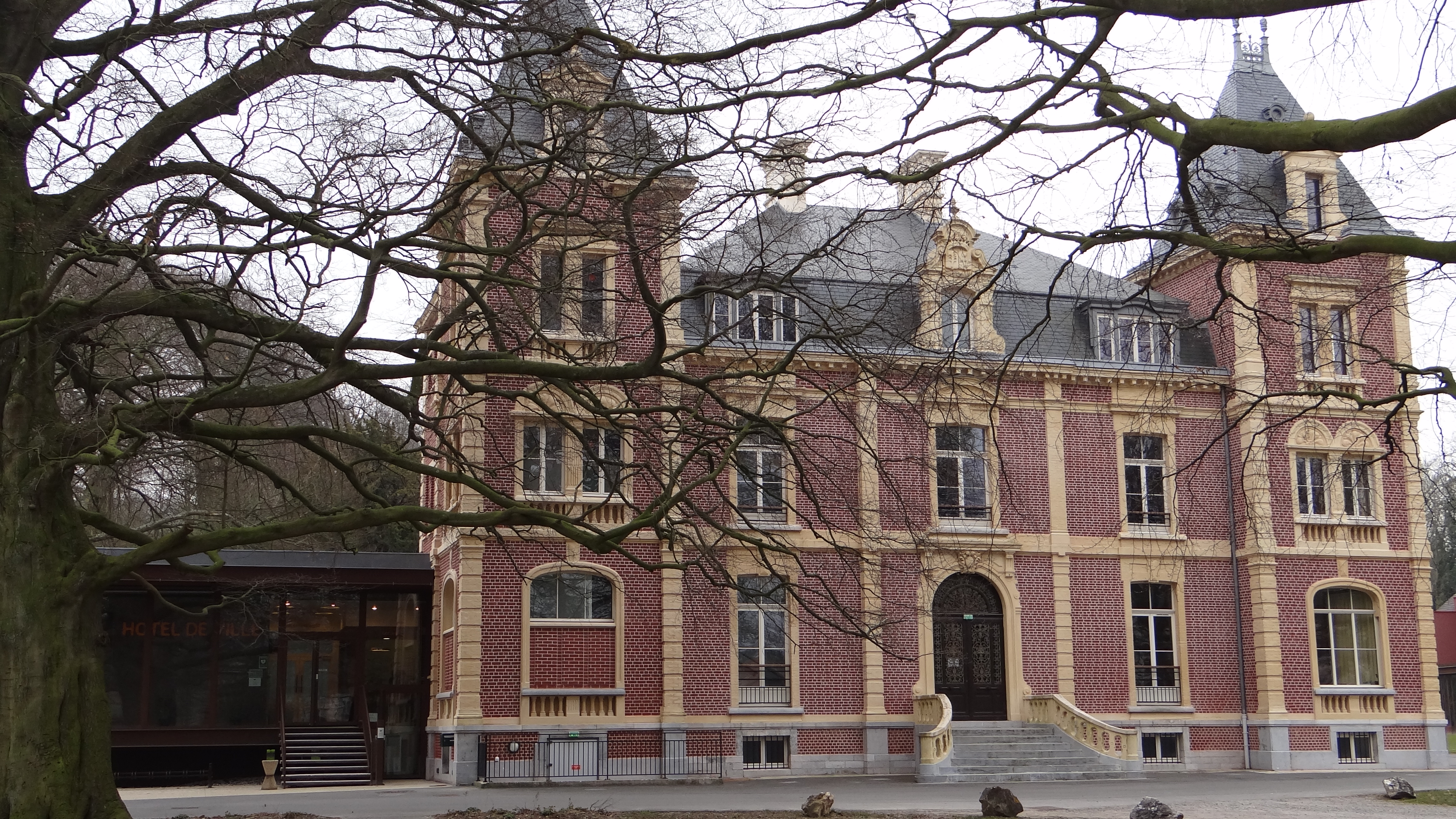
- The town hall of Blendecques

- Coat of arms
- Location of Blendecques
- Location within France Location within Hauts-de-France
- Coordinates: 50°43′04″N 2°16′38″E
- Country: France
- Region: Hauts-de-France
- Department: Pas-de-Calais
- Arrondissement: Saint-Omer
- Canton: Longuenesse
- Intercommunality: Pays de Saint-Omer

Government
  - Mayor (2020–2026): Rachid Ben Amor
- Area^{1}: 9.56 km^{2} (3.69 sq mi)
- Elevation: 25 m (82 ft)
- Highest elevation: 93 m (305 ft)
- Lowest elevation: 7 m (23 ft)
- Population (2023): 4,859
  - Density: 508/km^{2} (1,320/sq mi)
- Time zone: UTC+01:00 (CET)
  - Summer (DST): UTC+02:00 (CEST)
- INSEE/Postal code: 62139 /62575
- ^{1} French Land Register data, which excludes lakes, ponds, glaciers > 1 km^{2} (0.386 sq mi or 247 acres) and river estuaries.

Blendecques (French pronunciation: [blɑ̃dɛk]; West Flemish: Blendeke) is a commune in the Pas-de-Calais department in the Hauts-de-France region in northern France.

== Geography ==
The town is situated 3 miles (5 km) south of Saint-Omer, at the junction of the D77, D210 and D211 roads. The river Aa flows through the commune.
The town has a football team and a basketball team.

== Population ==
Historical population
Year	Pop.	±% p.a.
1968	4,431	—
1975	5,014	+1.78%
1982	5,338	+0.90%
1990	5,210	−0.30%
1999	5,186	−0.05%
2007	5,090	−0.23%
2012	5,205	+0.45%
2017	5,002	−0.79%
2023	4,859	−0.48%
Source: INSEE

== Notable people ==
- Alfred Machin, filmmaker
- Hugo Vandermersch, footballer

== Sights ==
- The nineteenth-century church of St. Gilles.
- The Chapelle de Soyecques.
- The eighteenth-century Château de La Garenne.
- Another Château of the 19th century.
- The abbey of Sainte-Colombe, dating from the twelfth century.
- The remains of some old watermills and lime-kilns.

== See also ==
- Audomarois
- Communes of the Pas-de-Calais department
