= Helfaut =

Helfaut Helveld
- Commune
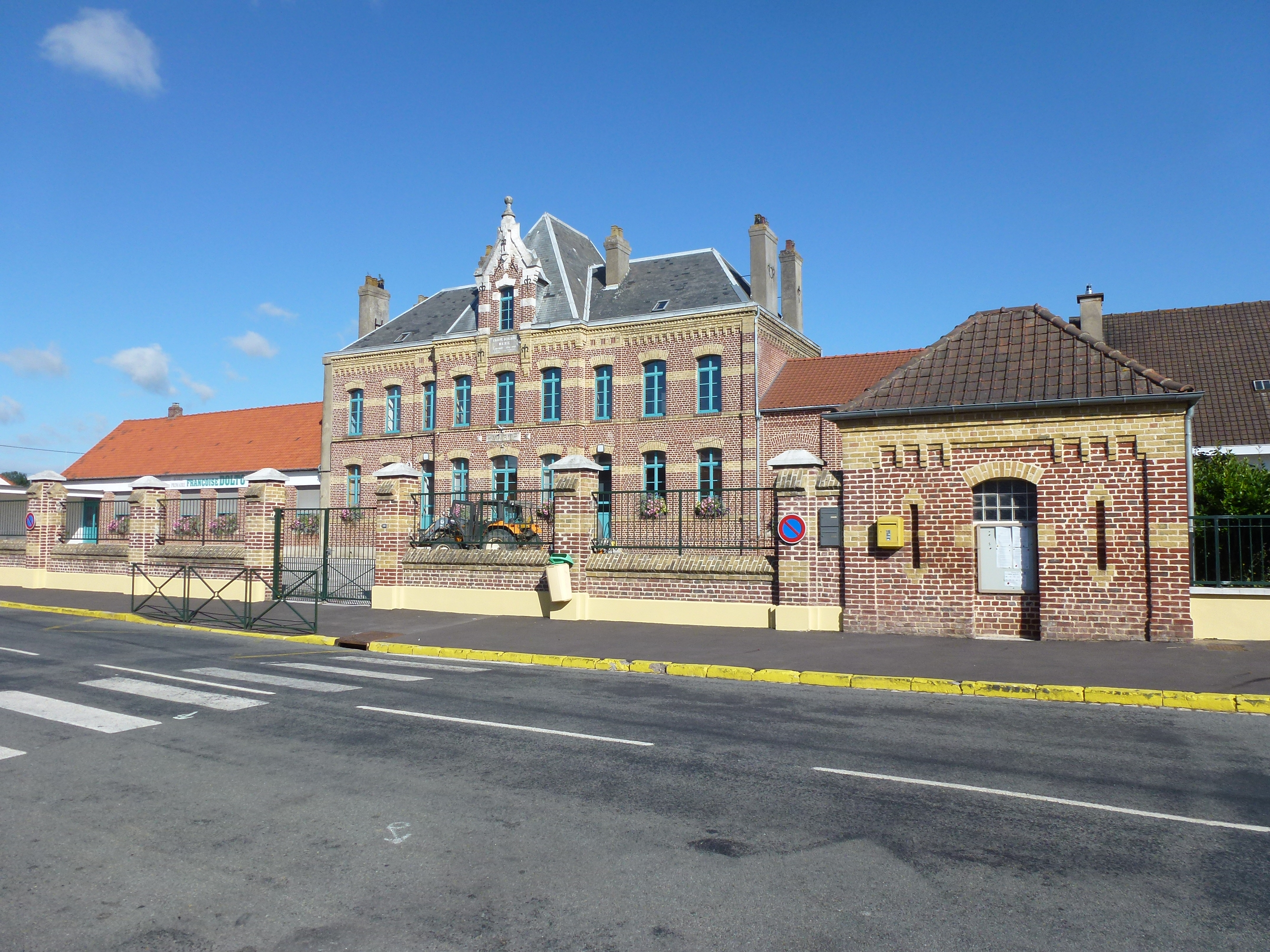
- The town hall and schools of Helfaut

- Coat of arms
- Location of Helfaut
- Location within France Location within Hauts-de-France
- Coordinates: 50°41′54″N 2°14′38″E
- Country: France
- Region: Hauts-de-France
- Department: Pas-de-Calais
- Arrondissement: Saint-Omer
- Canton: Longuenesse
- Intercommunality: Pays de Saint-Omer

Government
  - Mayor (2020–2026): Francis Marquant
- Area^{1}: 8.92 km^{2} (3.44 sq mi)
- Elevation: 92 m (302 ft)
- Highest elevation: 95 m (312 ft)
- Lowest elevation: 23 m (75 ft)
- Population (2023): 1,724
  - Density: 193/km^{2} (501/sq mi)
- Time zone: UTC+01:00 (CET)
  - Summer (DST): UTC+02:00 (CEST)
- INSEE/Postal code: 62423 /62570
- ^{1} French Land Register data, which excludes lakes, ponds, glaciers > 1 km^{2} (0.386 sq mi or 247 acres) and river estuaries.

Helfaut (French pronunciation: [ɛlfo]; West Flemish: Helveld; Picard: Hérfauw) is a commune in the Pas-de-Calais department in the Hauts-de-France region of France 4 miles (6 km) south of Saint-Omer, on a geological formation called the "plateau d'Helfaut", which separates the Aa valley to the north from the Lys valley, to the south.

The commune is home to rare and protected species in a heathland landscape, which is unusual for northern France and led to the creation of a nature reserve (Les Landes d'Helfaut).

== Population ==
The inhabitants are called Helfalois in French.

Historical population
Year	Pop.	±% p.a.
1968	1,139	—
1975	1,248	+1.31%
1982	1,426	+1.92%
1990	1,671	+2.00%
1999	1,693	+0.15%
2007	1,750	+0.41%
2012	1,596	−1.83%
2017	1,697	+1.23%
2023	1,724	+0.26%
Source: INSEE

== History ==
In World War II the village was the site of La coupole, an underground bunker housing a huge concrete dome, built by the Nazis between 1943 and 1944 to serve as a launching base for V2 rockets, which never entered service because of bombing raids by the Allies. It has been transformed into a museum.

== See also ==
- Audomarois
- Communes of the Pas-de-Calais department
