= Forest of Éperlecques =

Coordinates: 50°50′9.1″N 2°9′54″E

The Forest of Éperlecques (French: Forêt d'Éperlecques) is a large forest covering some 850 hectares in the commune of Éperlecques in the Pas-de-Calais department in the Nord-Pas-de-Calais region of France. Trails through the forest provide leisure opportunities for walkers. At its south-eastern edge is the Blockhaus d'Éperlecques, a museum preserving the Second World War Kraftwerk Nord West bunker built by the Germans as a launch site for V-2 rockets.
