= Wizernes =

Wizernes Wezerne
- Commune
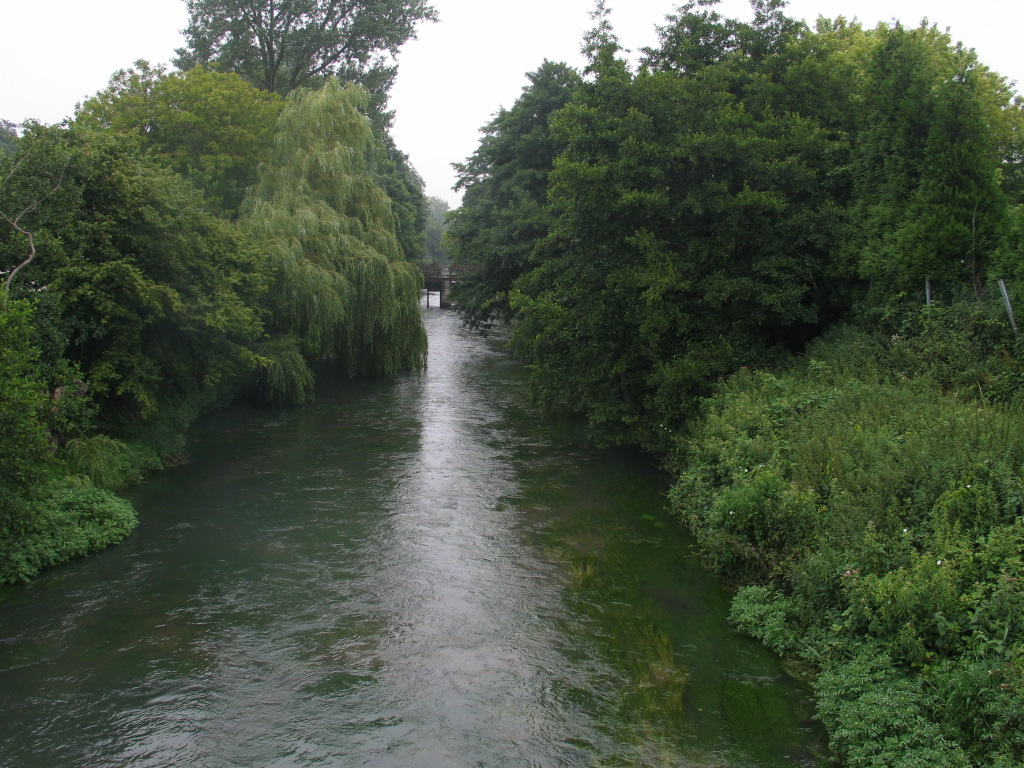
- The river Aa

- Coat of arms
- Location of Wizernes
- Location within France Location within Hauts-de-France
- Coordinates: 50°42′42″N 2°13′47″E
- Country: France
- Region: Hauts-de-France
- Department: Pas-de-Calais
- Arrondissement: Saint-Omer
- Canton: Longuenesse
- Intercommunality: Pays de Saint-Omer

Government
  - Mayor (2020–2026): Pierre Evrard
- Area^{1}: 6.16 km^{2} (2.38 sq mi)
- Elevation: 25 m (82 ft)
- Highest elevation: 119 m (390 ft)
- Lowest elevation: 17 m (56 ft)
- Population (2023): 3,321
  - Density: 539/km^{2} (1,400/sq mi)
- Time zone: UTC+01:00 (CET)
  - Summer (DST): UTC+02:00 (CEST)
- INSEE/Postal code: 62902 /62570
- Website: Official website (in French)
- ^{1} French Land Register data, which excludes lakes, ponds, glaciers > 1 km^{2} (0.386 sq mi or 247 acres) and river estuaries.

Wizernes (French pronunciation: [wizɛʁn]; West Flemish: Wezerne) is a commune in the Pas-de-Calais department, northern France. It lies 4 miles (6.4 km) southwest of Saint-Omer on the banks of the river Aa at the D928 and D211 road junction. The commune is twinned with Ensdorf, Germany.

== Population ==
Historical population
Year	Pop.	±% p.a.
1968	3,016	—
1975	3,309	+1.33%
1982	3,614	+1.27%
1990	3,362	−0.90%
1999	3,448	+0.28%
2007	3,362	−0.32%
2012	3,304	−0.35%
2017	3,344	+0.24%
2023	3,321	−0.11%
Source: INSEE

== History ==
The village was named "Weserinium" in 844 and was damaged by the Allies of World War II during Operation Crossbow bombings of the German V-weapon bunker complex known as La Coupole.

== Places of interest ==
- The church of St. Folquin, dating from the twentieth century.
- Aérodrome de Saint-Omer - Wizernes
