= Franz Xaver Dorsch =

German civil engineer (1899–1986)

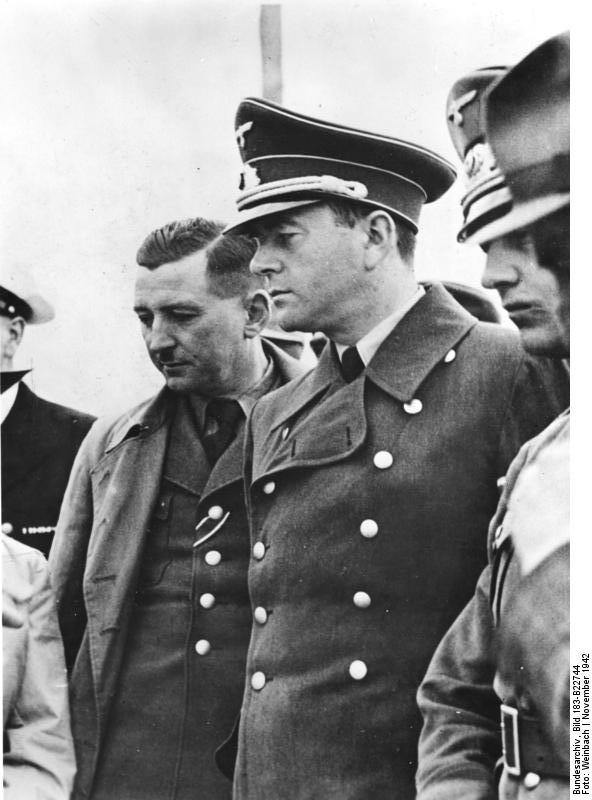
- Franz Xaver Dorsch (left) with Albert Speer (right), November 1942

Head of Organisation Todt
- In office 14 April 1944 – 8 May 1945
- Preceded by: Albert Speer
- Succeeded by: Position abolished

Personal details
- Born: 24 December 1899 Illertissen, German Empire
- Died: 8 November 1986 (aged 86) Munich, West Germany
- Education: Technische Hochschule Stuttgart
- Occupation: Civil engineer
- Known for: Founder of Dorsch Consult / Dorsch Gruppe
- Awards: Blood Order; Golden Party Badge; Knight's Cross of the War Merit Cross with Swords

Military service
- Allegiance: German Empire
- Branch/service: Imperial German Army; Freikorps
- Years of service: 1917–1919
- Rank: Sergeant
- Battles/wars: World War I

Franz Xaver Dorsch (24 December 1899 – 8 November 1986) was a German civil engineer who became the chief engineer of the Organisation Todt (OT), a civil and military engineering group in Nazi Germany that was responsible for a huge range of engineering projects at home and in the territories occupied by the Germans during the Second World War. He played a leading role in many of the Third Reich's biggest engineering projects, including the construction of the Siegfried Line (Westwall), the Atlantic Wall and numerous other fortifications in Germany and occupied Europe. Following the war, he founded the Dorsch Consult consulting engineering company in Wiesbaden.

== Life ==
Dorsch was born in Illertissen in the Allgäu region of Bavaria. He served in the German Army during the First World War from 1 June 1917 to 2 January 1919, leaving with the rank of sergeant. After demobilising he joined the paramilitary Freikorps and participated in the crushing of the Bavarian Soviet Republic in May 1919. Later that year he enrolled as a student of civil engineering at the Technische Hochschule Stuttgart, now the University of Stuttgart, and qualified as an architect in 1928. From 1929 to 1933 he worked with Fritz Todt, later to become the founder of the Organisation Todt, at the Munich engineering firm of Sager und Wörner.

Both men were early supporters of Adolf Hitler. Dorsch joined the embryonic Nazi Party and its paramilitary wing, the Sturmabteilung (SA), in 1922 and he participated in the unsuccessful Beer Hall Putsch of 8–9 November 1923. He was later entitled to wear the Golden Party Badge and the Blood Order of the Nazi Party in recognition of his early service. In the SA, he would go on to attain the rank of SA-Brigadeführer. In July 1933, Todt was appointed by Hitler as the Generalinspektor für das deutsche Straßenwesen ("Inspector General for German Roadways"), charged with the task of building the German autobahn network. Todt recruited Dorsch to serve as his deputy and Leiter (head) of the OT Zentrale office in Berlin, working on the autobahn project. In 1938 Dorsch played a leading role in the building of the Siegfried Line (known as the Westwall in German), a vast defence system stretching more than 630 kilometres (390 mi) along German's western borders from the Netherlands to Switzerland.

From December 1941 he directed the construction of the Atlantic Wall along the western coastline of occupied Europe, though his work was criticised by the military for ignoring input from the Army and Navy. On 8 February 1942 Fritz Todt was killed in an air crash. He was replaced by Albert Speer, Hitler's chief architect. Speer retained overall control of the OT as Reich Minister of Armaments and War Production but gave Dorsch the authority to run it as he saw fit, in effect making him the operational chief of the OT. In recognition of his service, Dorsch was awarded the Knight's Cross of the War Merit Cross with Swords on 13 May 1943.

However, the relationship between Speer and Dorsch was strained. A major bone of contention was that the OT only had responsibility for building projects outside the Reich. It was now increasingly being employed for construction work at home and needed to have control of the domestic construction industry. Dorsch and Speer fought a bitter battle over the issue, with Dorsch demanding that he be put in charge of all building activity inside the Reich so that new projects could be managed by the OT. Dorsch was secretly an ally of Speer's arch-enemy, Martin Bormann, who recruited him as an agent of the Party Chancellery to spy on Speer; as Speer later put it, Dorsch made him feel "insecure in my own Ministry". In the spring of 1944, Dorsch instigated a move to oust Speer; although he was unsuccessful, Speer's position was seriously weakened. Speer described the clique led by Dorsch as a "camarilla".

Hitler took command of the OT away from Speer and gave it to Dorsch on 14 April 1944. Dorsch was invited to submit proposals for a scheme, which Speer vigorously opposed, to move German industrial facilities into "concrete factories" or underground facilities to protect them from Allied bombing. Hermann Göring, the Reich Minister of Aviation, also ordered Dorsch to undertake the construction of underground aircraft hangars for the Luftwaffe. Dorsch was put in charge of the armaments ministry's building office and served as the minister's deputy as general commissioner for construction industry matters, as well as retaining his existing post as the head of the OT. He was thus in charge of virtually all the Third Reich's building projects in the final year of the war. Hitler's directive to build bombproof factories gave Dorsch the authority he needed to take control of the whole German construction industry and by September 1944 he controlled a workforce of 780,000 people, mostly forced labourers from abroad, who were engaged in construction projects within the Reich.

Dorsch avoided prosecution following the war and was commissioned by the United States Army to write a 1,000-page study of the Organisation Todt, which was published in 1947. In 1950, he set up the firm of "Reg.Baumeister Xaver Dorsch, Ingenieurbüro" which became the consulting engineering company Dorsch Consult in 1951 and Dorsch Gruppe in 2006. The company now employs 1,600 people and is Germany's largest independent planning and consulting company.

Dorsch died in Munich on 8 November 1986.
