= Canton of Fauquembergues =

Coordinates: 50.60167°N 2.09917°E

Fauquembergues
- Former canton
- Interactive map of Fauquembergues
- Country: France
- Region: Hauts-de-France
- Department: Pas-de-Calais
- No. of communes: {{{nbcomm}}}
- Disbanded: 2015
- Area: 186.49 km^{2} (72.00 sq mi)
- Population (2012): 9,931
  - Density: 53.25/km^{2} (137.9/sq mi)

The Canton of Fauquembergues is a former canton situated in the Pas-de-Calais département and in the Nord-Pas-de-Calais region of France. It was disbanded following the French canton reorganisation which came into effect in March 2015. It consisted of 18 communes, which joined the canton of Fruges in 2015. It had a total of 9,931 inhabitants (2012).

== Geography ==
This canton is centred on the town of Fauquembergues in the arrondissement of Saint-Omer. The altitude varies from 43m at (Coyecques) to 201m at (Thiembronne) for an average of 106m.

The canton comprised 18 communes:

- Audincthun
- Avroult
- Beaumetz-lès-Aire
- Bomy
- Coyecques
- Dennebrœucq
- Enguinegatte
- Enquin-les-Mines
- Erny-Saint-Julien
- Fauquembergues
- Febvin-Palfart
- Fléchin
- Laires
- Merck-Saint-Liévin
- Reclinghem
- Renty
- Saint-Martin-d'Hardinghem
- Thiembronne

== Population ==
Population Growth
1962	1968	1975	1982	1990	1999
8523	9066	8522	8358	8431	8492
Census count starting from 1962 : Population without double counting

== See also ==
- Arrondissement of Saint-Omer
- Cantons of Pas-de-Calais
- Communes of Pas-de-Calais
