= Communauté de communes du Canton de Fauquembergues =

Coordinates: 50.6003°N 2.0979°E

Canton de Fauquembergues
- Former communauté de communes
- Interactive map of Canton de Fauquembergues
- Country: France
- Region: Hauts-de-France
- Department: Pas-de-Calais
- No. of communes: {{{nbcomm}}}
- Established: 1994
- Disbanded: 2017
- Population (1999): 8,492

The Communauté de communes du Canton de Fauquembergues is a former intercommunality in the Pas-de-Calais département, in northern France. It was created in January 1994. It was merged into the Communauté d'agglomération du Pays de Saint-Omer in January 2017.

== Composition ==
It comprised the following 18 communes:

1. Audincthun
2. Avroult
3. Beaumetz-lès-Aire
4. Bomy
5. Coyecques
6. Dennebrœucq
7. Enguinegatte
8. Enquin-les-Mines
9. Erny-Saint-Julien
10. Fauquembergues
11. Febvin-Palfart
12. Fléchin
13. Laires
14. Merck-Saint-Liévin
15. Reclinghem
16. Renty
17. Saint-Martin-d'Hardinghem
18. Thiembronne
