= Communauté de communes de la Morinie =

Coordinates: 50.6374°N 2.2566°E

la Morinie
- Former communauté de communes
- Interactive map of la Morinie
- Country: France
- Region: Hauts-de-France
- Department: Pas-de-Calais
- No. of communes: {{{nbcomm}}}
- Established: 1994
- Disbanded: 2017
- Population (1999): 8,132

The Communauté de communes de la Morinie is a former intercommunality in the Pas-de-Calais département, in northern France. It was created in January 1994. It was merged into the Communauté d'agglomération du Pays de Saint-Omer in January 2017.

== Composition ==
It comprised the following 8 communes:

1. Bellinghem
2. Clarques
3. Delettes
4. Ecques
5. Heuringhem
6. Mametz
7. Rebecques
8. Thérouanne
