= Canton of Arques =

Coordinates: 50.73611°N 2.30333°E

Arques
- Former canton
- Interactive map of Arques
- Country: France
- Region: Hauts-de-France
- Department: Pas-de-Calais
- No. of communes: {{{nbcomm}}}
- Disbanded: 2015
- Population (2012): 20,550

The Canton of Arques is a former canton situated in the Pas-de-Calais département and in the Nord-Pas-de-Calais region of France. It was disbanded following the French canton reorganisation which came into effect in March 2015. It had a total of 20,550 inhabitants (2012, without double counting).

== Geography ==
This canton was centred on the town of Arques in the arrondissement of Saint-Omer. The altitude varies from 0m at (Saint-Omer) to 95m at (Helfaut) for an average of 28m.

The canton comprised 5 communes:

- Arques
- Blendecques
- Campagne-lès-Wardrecques
- Helfaut
- Saint-Omer (partly)

== See also ==
- Arrondissement of Saint-Omer
- Cantons of Pas-de-Calais
- Communes of Pas-de-Calais
