= Bomy =

- Commune
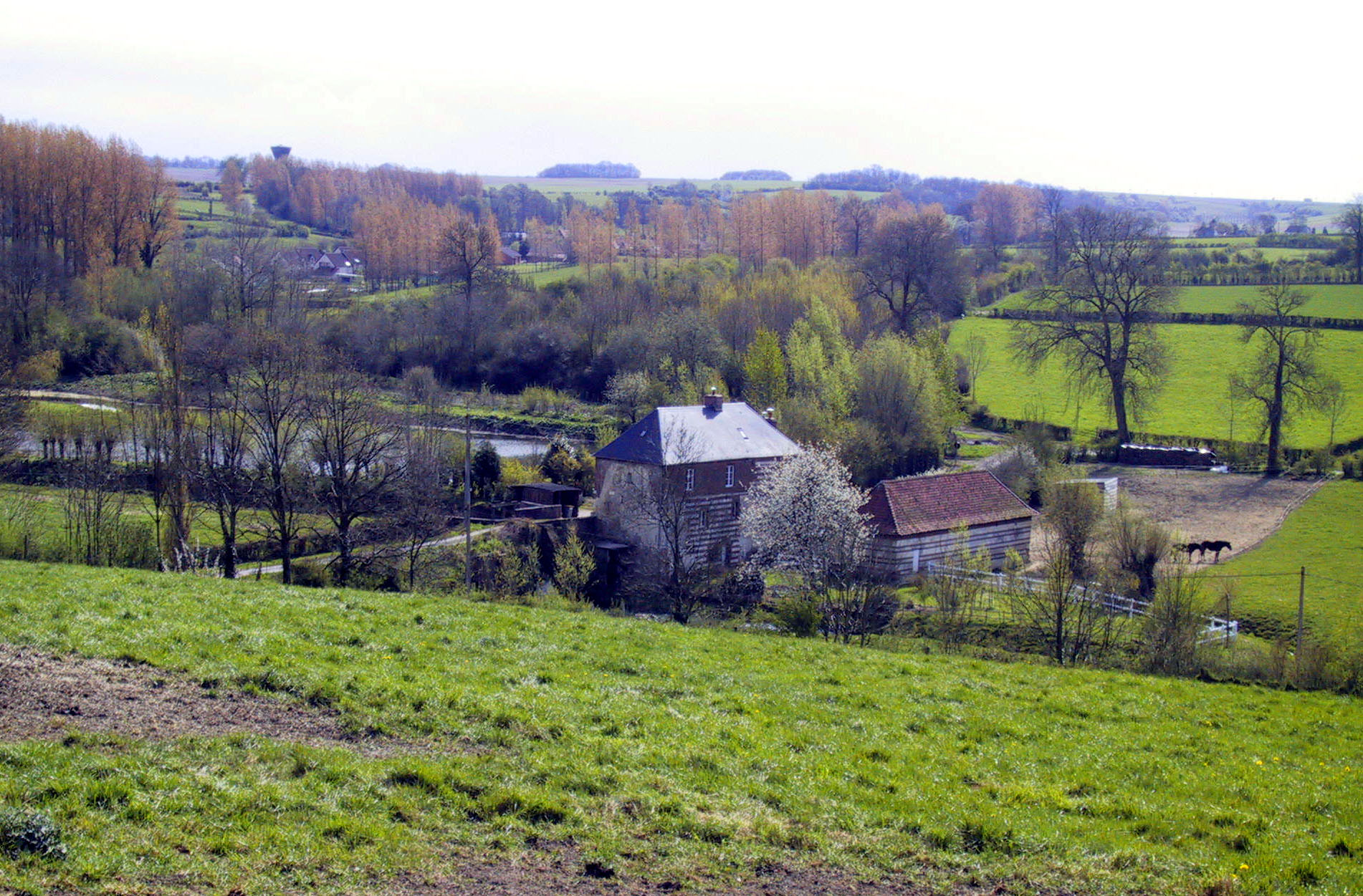
- A typical building of Pas-de-Calais, in Bomy

- Coat of arms
- Location of Bomy
- Location within France Location within Hauts-de-France
- Coordinates: 50°34′29″N 2°14′10″E
- Country: France
- Region: Hauts-de-France
- Department: Pas-de-Calais
- Arrondissement: Saint-Omer
- Canton: Fruges
- Intercommunality: CA Pays de Saint-Omer

Government
  - Mayor (2020–2026): Alain Deblock
- Area^{1}: 14.63 km^{2} (5.65 sq mi)
- Elevation: 102 m (335 ft)
- Highest elevation: 180 m (590 ft)
- Lowest elevation: 85 m (279 ft)
- Population (2023): 615
  - Density: 42.0/km^{2} (109/sq mi)
- Time zone: UTC+01:00 (CET)
  - Summer (DST): UTC+02:00 (CEST)
- INSEE/Postal code: 62153 /62960
- ^{1} French Land Register data, which excludes lakes, ponds, glaciers > 1 km^{2} (0.386 sq mi or 247 acres) and river estuaries.

Bomy (French pronunciation: [bɔmi]) is a commune in the Pas-de-Calais department in the Hauts-de-France region in northern France.

== Geography ==
Bomy is situated 12 miles (19 km) south of the town of Saint-Omer, on the D130 road. It is surrounded by the communes of Beaumetz-lès-Aire, Erny-Saint-Julien and Laires.

== Population ==
Historical population
Year	Pop.	±% p.a.
1968	674	—
1975	658	−0.34%
1982	603	−1.24%
1990	608	+0.10%
1999	604	−0.07%
2007	603	−0.02%
2012	606	+0.10%
2017	631	+0.81%
2023	615	−0.43%
Source: INSEE

== Sights ==
- The church of St. Vaast, dating from the thirteenth century.
- The remains of the old château, where a truce between France and Spain was signed in 1537.
- The present-day château. The building dates from 1755. It was confiscated during the French Revolution and sold for use as a sugar beet factory. It was sold again in 1839 to the Baron de Vilmarest.
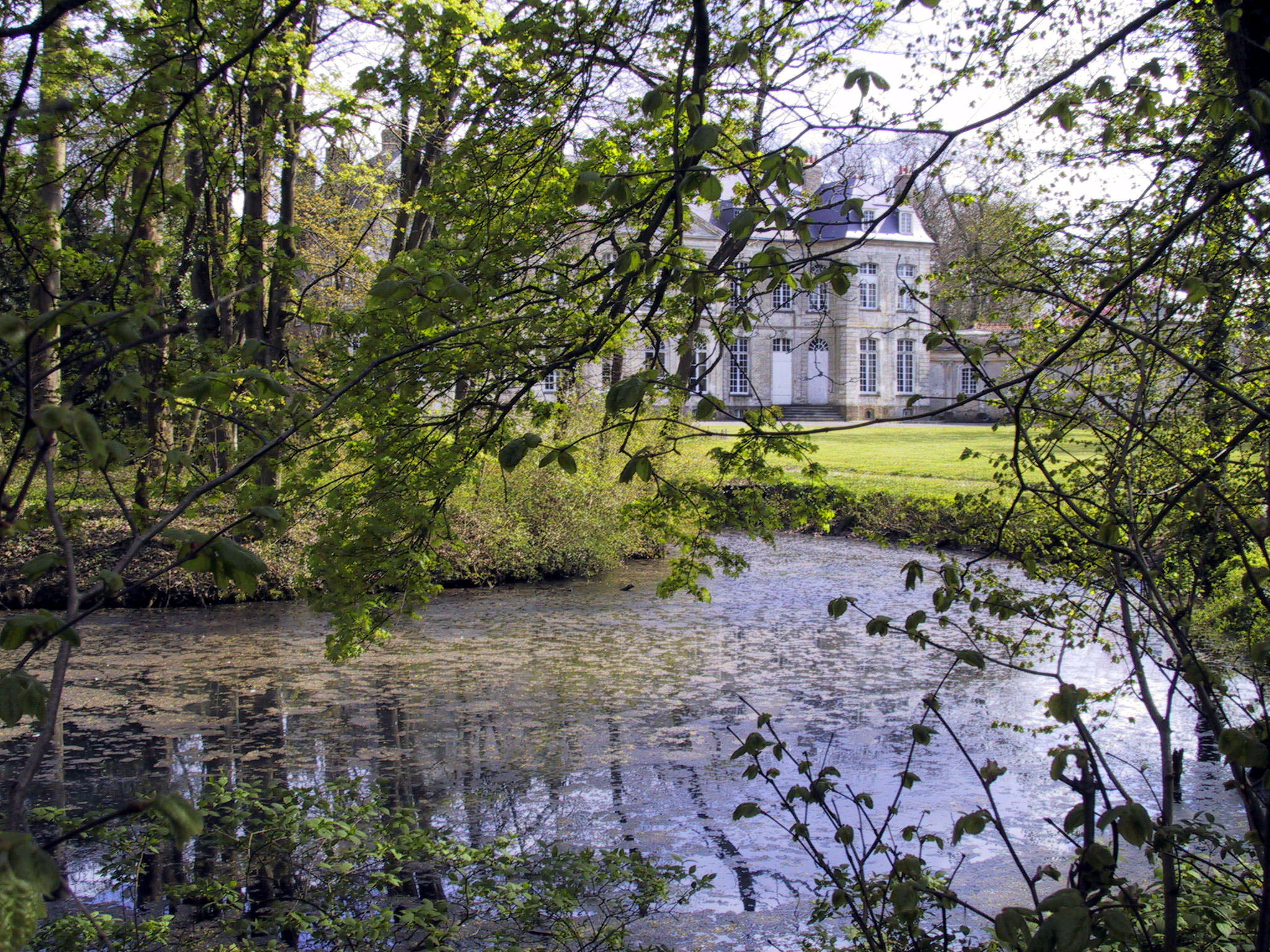
The wooded site of the old château

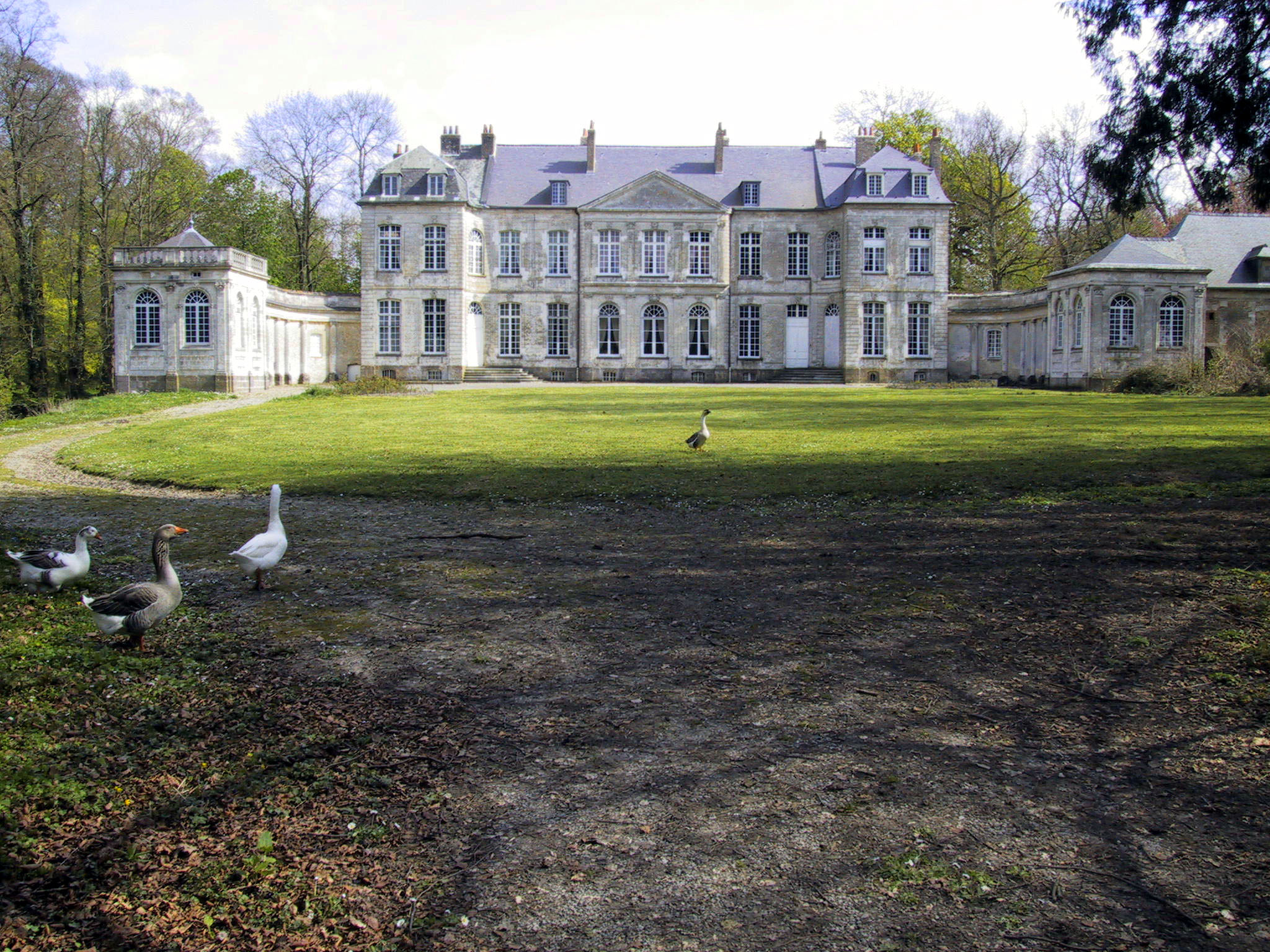
The main façade of the present building

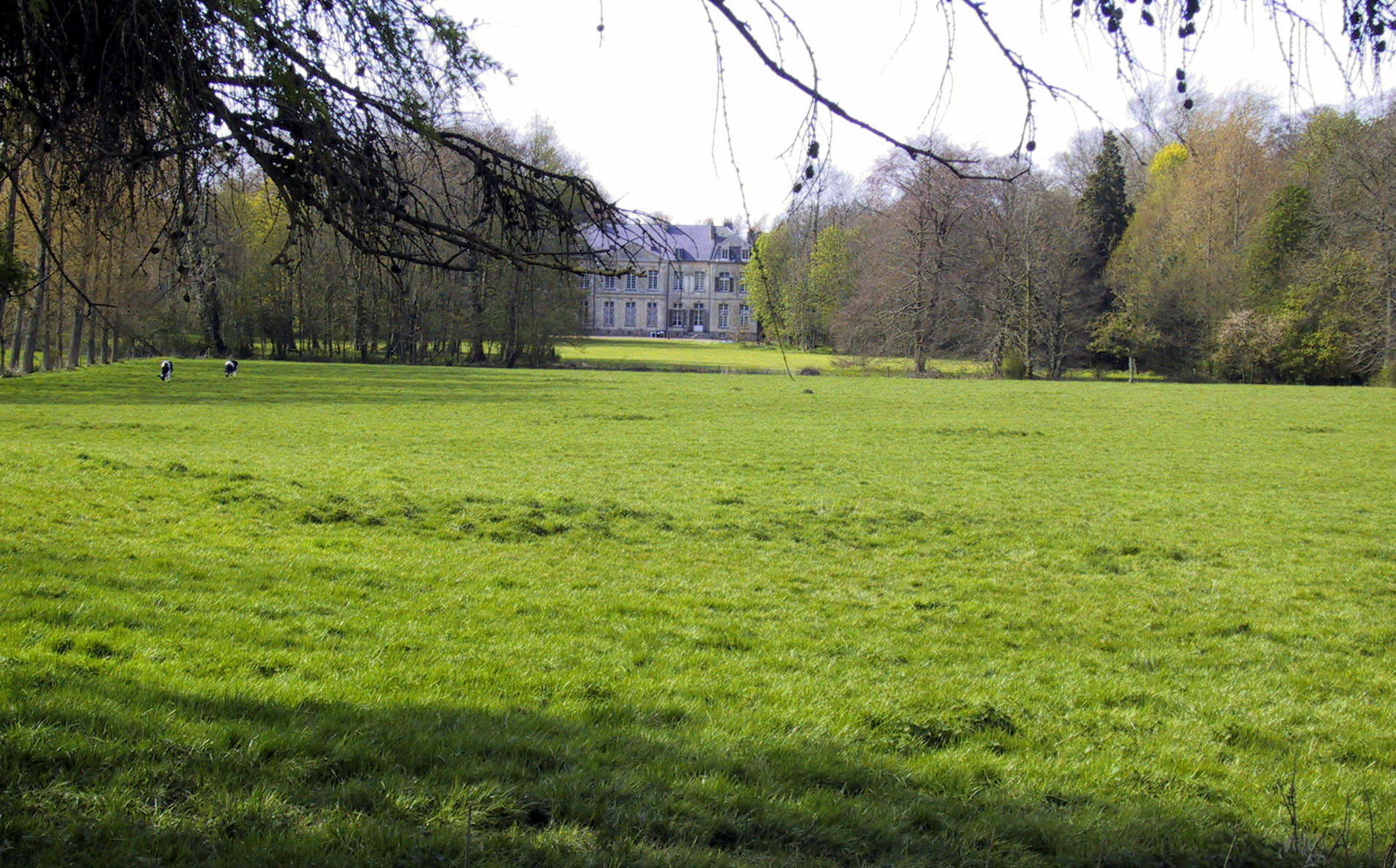
View of the rear of the château

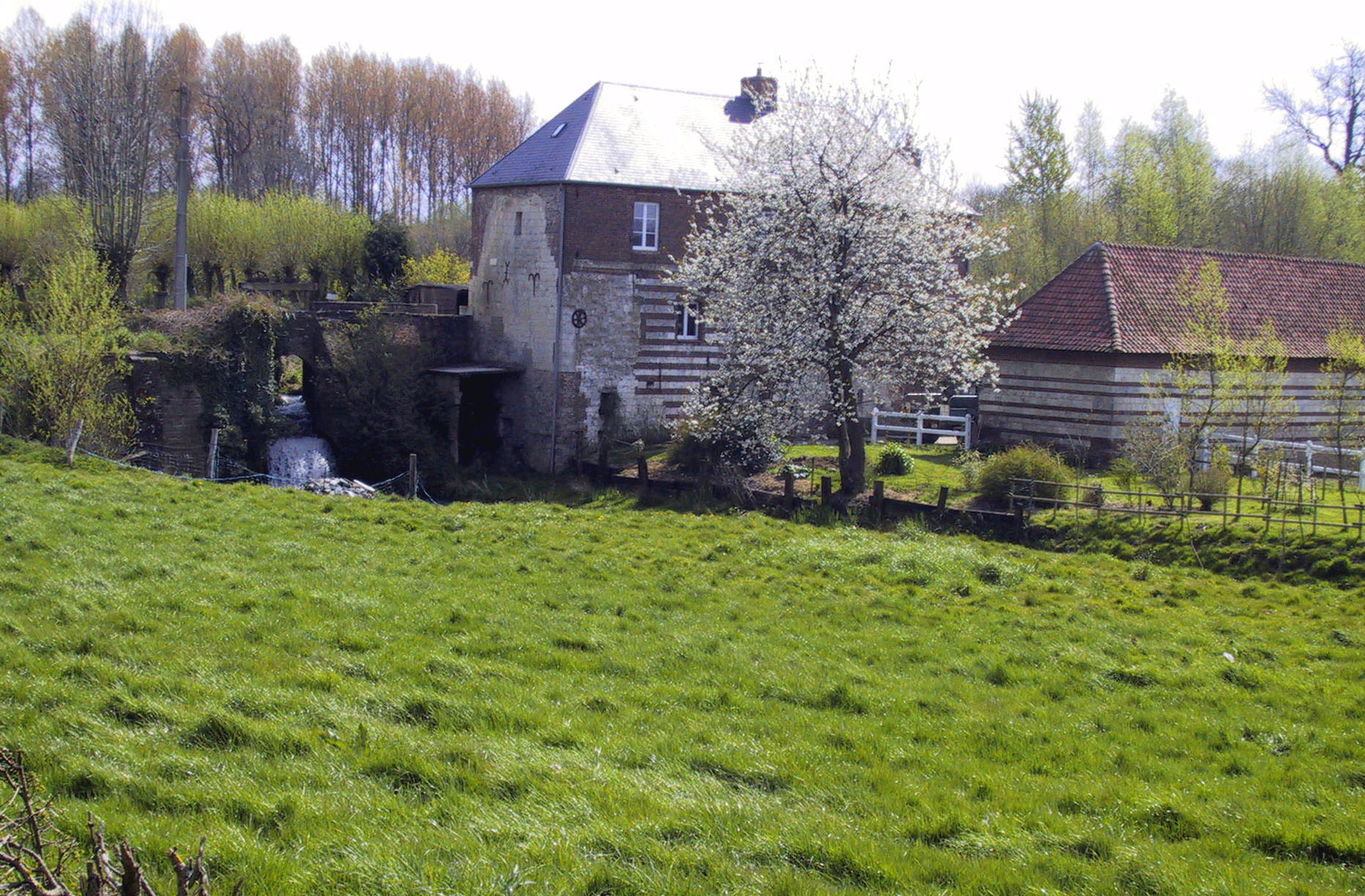
Weir on the river Locquette

== See also ==
- Communes of the Pas-de-Calais department
