= Quiestède =

Quiestède Kierestede
- Commune
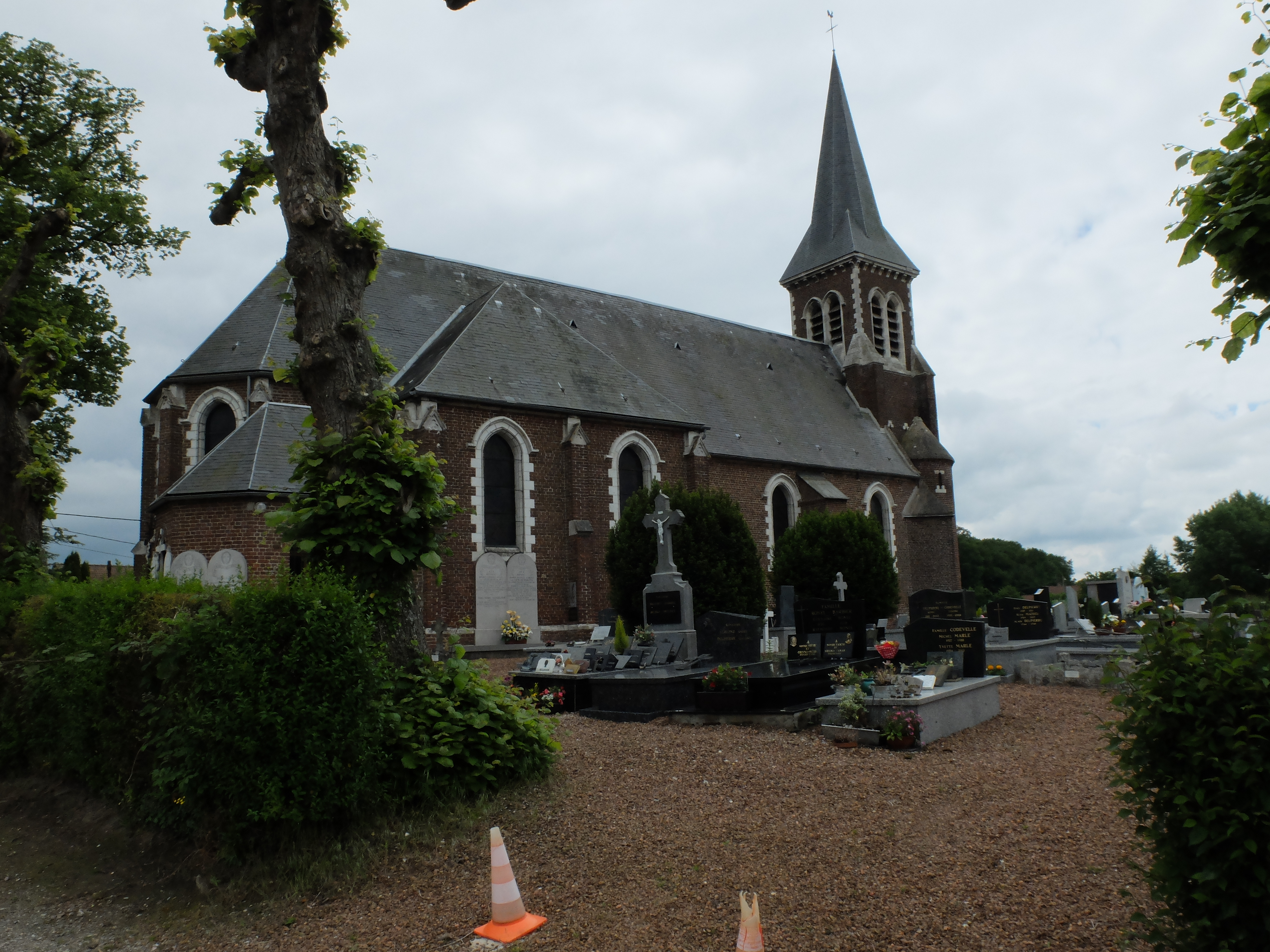
- The church of Quiestède

- Coat of arms
- Location of Quiestède
- Location within France Location within Hauts-de-France
- Coordinates: 50°40′48″N 2°19′07″E
- Country: France
- Region: Hauts-de-France
- Department: Pas-de-Calais
- Arrondissement: Saint-Omer
- Canton: Fruges
- Intercommunality: Pays de Saint-Omer

Government
  - Mayor (2020–2026): Alain Tellier
- Area^{1}: 2.83 km^{2} (1.09 sq mi)
- Elevation: 37 m (121 ft)
- Highest elevation: 60 m (200 ft)
- Lowest elevation: 23 m (75 ft)
- Population (2023): 663
  - Density: 234/km^{2} (607/sq mi)
- Time zone: UTC+01:00 (CET)
  - Summer (DST): UTC+02:00 (CEST)
- INSEE/Postal code: 62681 /62120
- ^{1} French Land Register data, which excludes lakes, ponds, glaciers > 1 km^{2} (0.386 sq mi or 247 acres) and river estuaries.

Quiestède (West Flemish: Kierestede) is a commune in the Pas-de-Calais department in the Hauts-de-France region of France.

== Geography ==
Quiestède lies about 6 miles (9 km) south of Saint-Omer, at the junction of the D201 and D195 roads.

== Population ==
Historical population
Year	Pop.	±% p.a.
1968	303	—
1975	291	−0.58%
1982	402	+4.72%
1990	537	+3.69%
1999	665	+2.40%
2007	654	−0.21%
2012	642	−0.37%
2017	614	−0.89%
2023	663	+1.29%
Source: INSEE

== Places of interest ==
- The church of Notre-Dame, dating from the sixteenth century.
- The Château de Laprée, built in 1760.

== See also ==
- Communes of the Pas-de-Calais department
