= Racquinghem =

Racquinghem Rakingem
- Commune
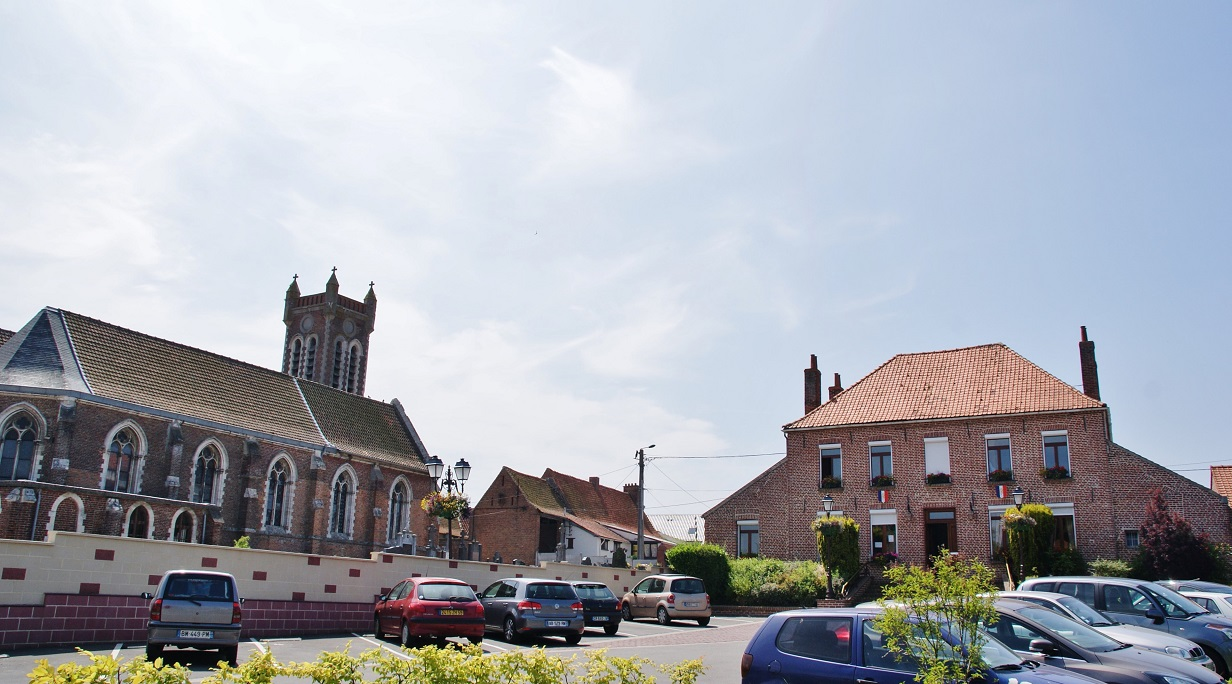
- The town hall and church of Racquinghem

- Coat of arms
- Location of Racquinghem
- Location within France Location within Hauts-de-France
- Coordinates: 50°41′38″N 2°21′31″E
- Country: France
- Region: Hauts-de-France
- Department: Pas-de-Calais
- Arrondissement: Saint-Omer
- Canton: Fruges
- Intercommunality: Pays de Saint-Omer

Government
  - Mayor (2020–2026): Jean Luc Demaire
- Area^{1}: 5.32 km^{2} (2.05 sq mi)
- Elevation: 41 m (135 ft)
- Highest elevation: 68 m (223 ft)
- Lowest elevation: 20 m (66 ft)
- Population (2023): 2,257
  - Density: 424/km^{2} (1,100/sq mi)
- Time zone: UTC+01:00 (CET)
  - Summer (DST): UTC+02:00 (CEST)
- INSEE/Postal code: 62684 /62120
- ^{1} French Land Register data, which excludes lakes, ponds, glaciers > 1 km^{2} (0.386 sq mi or 247 acres) and river estuaries.

Racquinghem (French pronunciation: [ʁakɛ̃ɡɛm]; West Flemish: Rakingem) is a commune in the Pas-de-Calais department in the Hauts-de-France region of France about 6 miles (9 km) southeast of Saint-Omer, on the banks of the Noeufossé canal, the border between the department of Nord and the Pas de Calais.

The commune is close to the eastern boundary of the Helfaut plateau, site of the Helfaut Nature Reserve. Its flora comprises both dry and wet heathland and some protected fauna, mostly amphibians.

== Population ==
Historical population
| Year | Pop. | ±% p.a. |
|---|---|---|
| 1968 | 976 | — |
| 1975 | 1,219 | +3.23% |
| 1982 | 1,816 | +5.86% |
| 1990 | 2,368 | +3.37% |
| 1999 | 2,334 | −0.16% |
| 2007 | 2,247 | −0.47% |
| 2012 | 2,319 | +0.63% |
| 2017 | 2,276 | −0.37% |
| 2023 | 2,257 | −0.14% |
Source: INSEE

== See also ==
- Communes of the Pas-de-Calais department
