= Communauté d'agglomération du Pays de Saint-Omer =

Coordinates: 50.74°N 2.24°E

Pays de Saint-Omer
- Communauté d'agglomération
- Country: France
- Region: Hauts-de-France
- Department: Pas-de-Calais
- No. of communes: {{{nbcomm}}}
- Established: January 1, 2017

Government
  - President: Laurent Denis
- Area: 543.6 km^{2} (209.9 sq mi)
- Population (2018): 105,169
  - Density: 193.5/km^{2} (501.1/sq mi)
- Website: www.ca-pso.fr

The Communauté d'agglomération du Pays de Saint-Omer (CAPSO) is located in the Pas-de-Calais département, in northern France. It was formed on 1 January 2017 by the merger of the former Communauté d'agglomération de Saint-Omer, the Communauté de communes du Canton de Fauquembergues, the Communauté de communes du pays d'Aire and the Communauté de communes de la Morinie. Its seat is Longuenesse. Its area is 543.6 km^{2}. Its population was 105,169 in 2018.

== Composition ==
The communauté d'agglomération consists of the following 53 communes:

1. Aire-sur-la-Lys
2. Arques
3. Audincthun
4. Avroult
5. Bayenghem-lès-Éperlecques
6. Beaumetz-lès-Aire
7. Bellinghem
8. Blendecques
9. Bomy
10. Campagne-lès-Wardrecques
11. Clairmarais
12. Coyecques
13. Delettes
14. Dennebrœucq
15. Ecques
16. Enquin-lez-Guinegatte
17. Éperlecques
18. Erny-Saint-Julien
19. Fauquembergues
20. Febvin-Palfart
21. Fléchin
22. Hallines
23. Helfaut
24. Heuringhem
25. Houlle
26. Laires
27. Longuenesse
28. Mametz
29. Mentque-Nortbécourt
30. Merck-Saint-Liévin
31. Moringhem
32. Moulle
33. Nordausques
34. Nort-Leulinghem
35. Quiestède
36. Racquinghem
37. Reclinghem
38. Renty
39. Roquetoire
40. Saint-Augustin
41. Saint-Martin-d'Hardinghem
42. Saint-Martin-lez-Tatinghem
43. Saint-Omer
44. Salperwick
45. Serques
46. Thérouanne
47. Thiembronne
48. Tilques
49. Tournehem-sur-la-Hem
50. Wardrecques
51. Wittes
52. Wizernes
53. Zouafques
