= Campagne-lès-Wardrecques =

- Commune
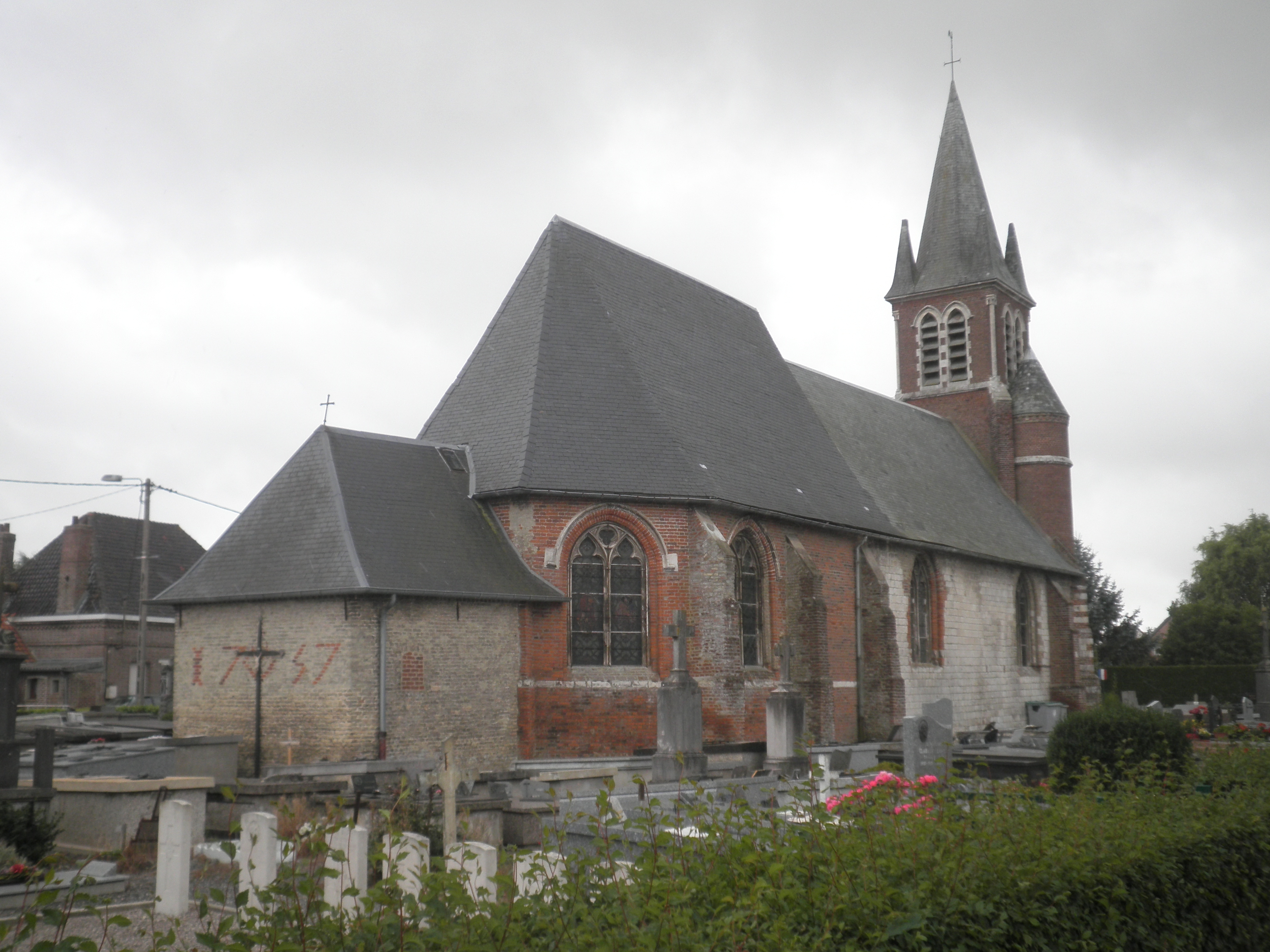
- Church of St.Martin and Commonwealth war graves

- Coat of arms
- Location of Campagne-lès-Wardrecques
- Location within France Location within Hauts-de-France
- Coordinates: 50°43′11″N 2°20′03″E
- Country: France
- Region: Hauts-de-France
- Department: Pas-de-Calais
- Arrondissement: Saint-Omer
- Canton: Longuenesse
- Intercommunality: Pays de Saint-Omer

Government
  - Mayor (2020–2026): Benoît Ageorges
- Area^{1}: 4.69 km^{2} (1.81 sq mi)
- Elevation: 26 m (85 ft)
- Highest elevation: 71 m (233 ft)
- Lowest elevation: 22 m (72 ft)
- Population (2023): 1,301
  - Density: 277/km^{2} (718/sq mi)
- Time zone: UTC+01:00 (CET)
  - Summer (DST): UTC+02:00 (CEST)
- INSEE/Postal code: 62205 /62120
- ^{1} French Land Register data, which excludes lakes, ponds, glaciers > 1 km^{2} (0.386 sq mi or 247 acres) and river estuaries.

Campagne-lès-Wardrecques (French pronunciation: [kɑ̃paɲ lɛ waʁdʁɛk], literally Campagne near Wardrecques) is a commune in the Pas-de-Calais department in the Hauts-de-France region of France.

== Geography ==
Campagne-lès-Wardrecques is a village situated 5 miles (8 km) southeast of Saint-Omer, on the D200 road, near the junction of the N42 and N43 roads. The Neufosse Canal passes by the commune.

== Population ==
Historical population
| Year | Pop. | ±% p.a. |
|---|---|---|
| 1968 | 412 | — |
| 1975 | 492 | +2.57% |
| 1982 | 724 | +5.67% |
| 1990 | 862 | +2.20% |
| 1999 | 947 | +1.05% |
| 2007 | 1,040 | +1.18% |
| 2012 | 1,180 | +2.56% |
| 2017 | 1,243 | +1.05% |
| 2023 | 1,301 | +0.76% |
Source: INSEE

== Places of interest ==
- The church of St. Martin, dating from the sixteenth century.

== See also ==
- Audomarois
- Communes of the Pas-de-Calais department
