= Arrondissement of Saint-Omer =

Coordinates: 50.75°N 2.25°E

Saint-Omer
- Arrondissement
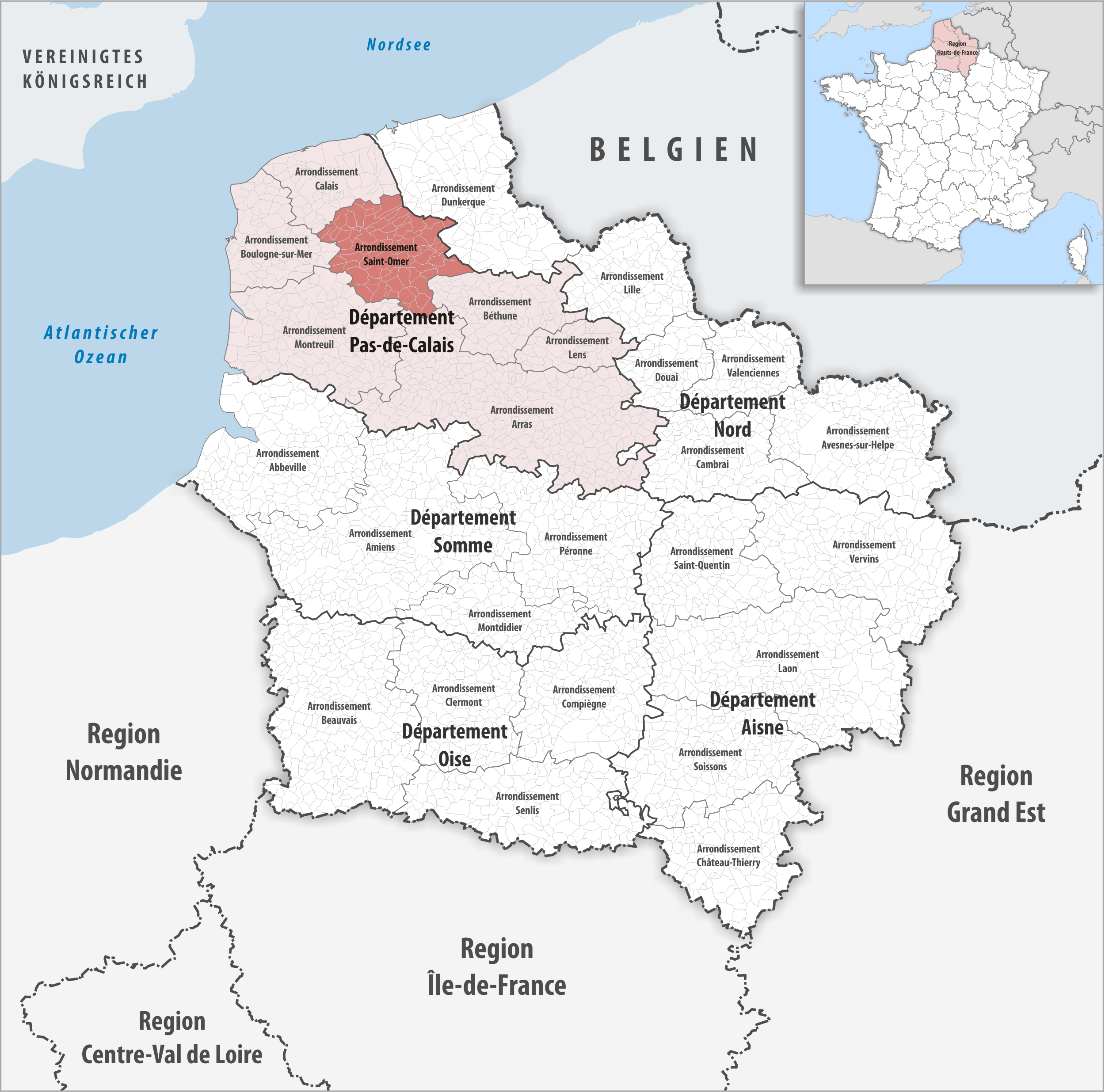
- Location within the region Hauts-de-France
- Country: France
- Region: Hauts-de-France
- Department: Pas-de-Calais
- No. of communes: {{{nbcomm}}}
- Area: 813.0 km^{2} (313.9 sq mi)
- Population (2023): 128,316
  - Density: 157.8/km^{2} (408.8/sq mi)
- INSEE code: 625

The arrondissement of Saint-Omer is an arrondissement of France in the Pas-de-Calais department in the Hauts-de-France region. It has 89 communes. Its population is 129,124 (2021), and its area is 813.0 km^{2} (313.9 sq mi).

== Composition ==
The communes of the arrondissement of Saint-Omer, and their INSEE codes, are:

1. Acquin-Westbécourt (62008)
2. Affringues (62010)
3. Aire-sur-la-Lys (62014)
4. Alquines (62024)
5. Arques (62040)
6. Audincthun (62053)
7. Audrehem (62055)
8. Avroult (62067)
9. Bayenghem-lès-Seninghem (62088)
10. Bayenghem-lès-Éperlecques (62087)
11. Beaumetz-lès-Aire (62095)
12. Bellinghem (62471)
13. Blendecques (62139)
14. Bléquin (62140)
15. Boisdinghem (62149)
16. Bomy (62153)
17. Bonningues-lès-Ardres (62155)
18. Bouvelinghem (62169)
19. Campagne-lès-Wardrecques (62205)
20. Clairmarais (62225)
21. Clerques (62228)
22. Cléty (62229)
23. Coulomby (62245)
24. Coyecques (62254)
25. Delettes (62265)
26. Dennebrœucq (62267)
27. Dohem (62271)
28. Ecques (62288)
29. Elnes (62292)
30. Enquin-lez-Guinegatte (62295)
31. Éperlecques (62297)
32. Erny-Saint-Julien (62304)
33. Escœuilles (62308)
34. Esquerdes (62309)
35. Fauquembergues (62325)
36. Febvin-Palfart (62327)
37. Fléchin (62336)
38. Hallines (62403)
39. Haut-Loquin (62419)
40. Helfaut (62423)
41. Heuringhem (62452)
42. Houlle (62458)
43. Journy (62478)
44. Laires (62485)
45. Ledinghem (62495)
46. Leulinghem (62504)
47. Longuenesse (62525)
48. Lumbres (62534)
49. Mametz (62543)
50. Mentque-Nortbécourt (62567)
51. Merck-Saint-Liévin (62569)
52. Moringhem (62592)
53. Moulle (62595)
54. Nielles-lès-Bléquin (62613)
55. Nordausques (62618)
56. Nort-Leulinghem (62622)
57. Ouve-Wirquin (62644)
58. Pihem (62656)
59. Quelmes (62674)
60. Quercamps (62675)
61. Quiestède (62681)
62. Racquinghem (62684)
63. Rebergues (62692)
64. Reclinghem (62696)
65. Remilly-Wirquin (62702)
66. Renty (62704)
67. Roquetoire (62721)
68. Saint-Augustin (62691)
69. Saint-Martin-d'Hardinghem (62760)
70. Saint-Martin-lez-Tatinghem (62757)
71. Saint-Omer (62765)
72. Salperwick (62772)
73. Seninghem (62788)
74. Serques (62792)
75. Setques (62794)
76. Surques (62803)
77. Thérouanne (62811)
78. Thiembronne (62812)
79. Tilques (62819)
80. Tournehem-sur-la-Hem (62827)
81. Vaudringhem (62837)
82. Wardrecques (62875)
83. Wavrans-sur-l'Aa (62882)
84. Wismes (62897)
85. Wisques (62898)
86. Wittes (62901)
87. Wizernes (62902)
88. Zouafques (62904)
89. Zudausques (62905)

== History ==
The arrondissement of Saint-Omer was created in 1800. At the January 2017 reorganisation of the arrondissements of Pas-de-Calais, it lost 23 communes to the arrondissement of Calais.

As a result of the reorganisation of the cantons of France which came into effect in 2015, the borders of the cantons are no longer related to the borders of the arrondissements. The cantons of the arrondissement of Saint-Omer were, as of January 2015:

1. Aire-sur-la-Lys
2. Ardres
3. Arques
4. Audruicq
5. Fauquembergues
6. Lumbres
7. Saint-Omer-Nord
8. Saint-Omer-Sud
