= Saint-Martin-d'Hardinghem =

Saint-Martin-d'Hardinghem Dardingem
- Commune
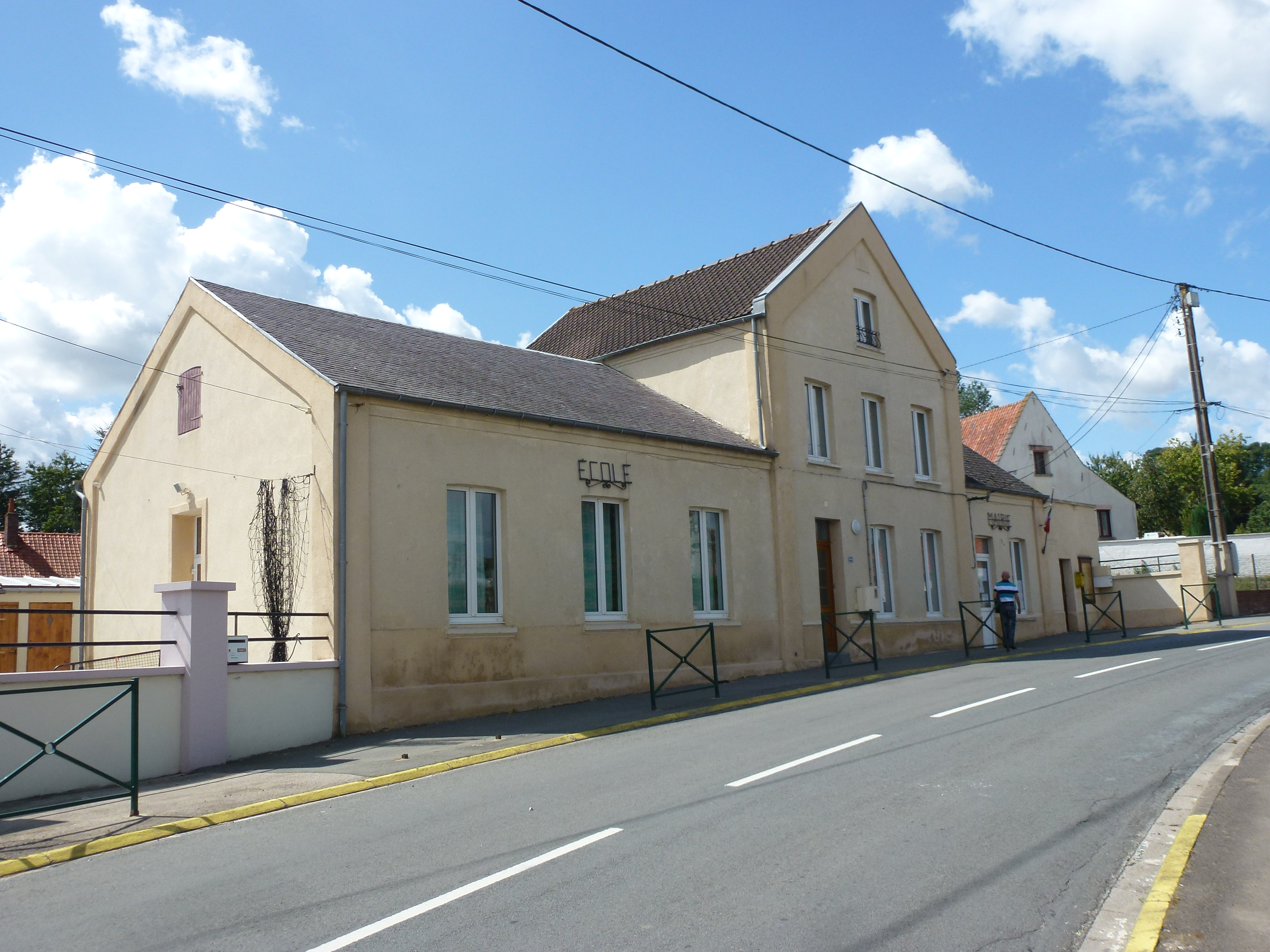
- The town hall and school of Saint-Martin-d'Hardinghem

- Coat of arms
- Location of Saint-Martin-d'Hardinghem
- Location within France Location within Hauts-de-France
- Coordinates: 50°36′18″N 2°05′45″E
- Country: France
- Region: Hauts-de-France
- Department: Pas-de-Calais
- Arrondissement: Saint-Omer
- Canton: Fruges
- Intercommunality: Pays de Saint-Omer

Government
  - Mayor (2020–2026): Bertrand Pruvost
- Area^{1}: 6.68 km^{2} (2.58 sq mi)
- Elevation: 73 m (240 ft)
- Highest elevation: 163 m (535 ft)
- Lowest elevation: 67 m (220 ft)
- Population (2023): 264
  - Density: 39.5/km^{2} (102/sq mi)
- Time zone: UTC+01:00 (CET)
  - Summer (DST): UTC+02:00 (CEST)
- INSEE/Postal code: 62760 /62560
- ^{1} French Land Register data, which excludes lakes, ponds, glaciers > 1 km^{2} (0.386 sq mi or 247 acres) and river estuaries.

Saint-Martin-d'Hardinghem (French pronunciation: [sɛ̃ maʁtɛ̃ daʁdɛ̃ɡɑ̃]; West Flemish: Dardingem; Picard: Saint-Martin-d'Hardinghin) is a commune in the Pas-de-Calais department in the Hauts-de-France region of France.

== Geography ==
Saint-Martin-d'Hardinghem is a small suburb of Fauquembergues, 10 miles (16 km) to the southwest of Saint-Omer on the D158 road.

== Population ==
Historical population
| Year | Pop. | ±% p.a. |
|---|---|---|
| 1968 | 275 | — |
| 1975 | 270 | −0.26% |
| 1982 | 273 | +0.16% |
| 1990 | 287 | +0.63% |
| 1999 | 303 | +0.60% |
| 2007 | 312 | +0.37% |
| 2012 | 291 | −1.38% |
| 2017 | 286 | −0.35% |
| 2023 | 264 | −1.33% |
Source: INSEE

== Places of interest ==
- The church of St.Martin, dating from the thirteenth century.
- The Château d'Hervarre.

== See also ==
- Communes of the Pas-de-Calais department
