= Ecques =

Ecques Eske
- Commune
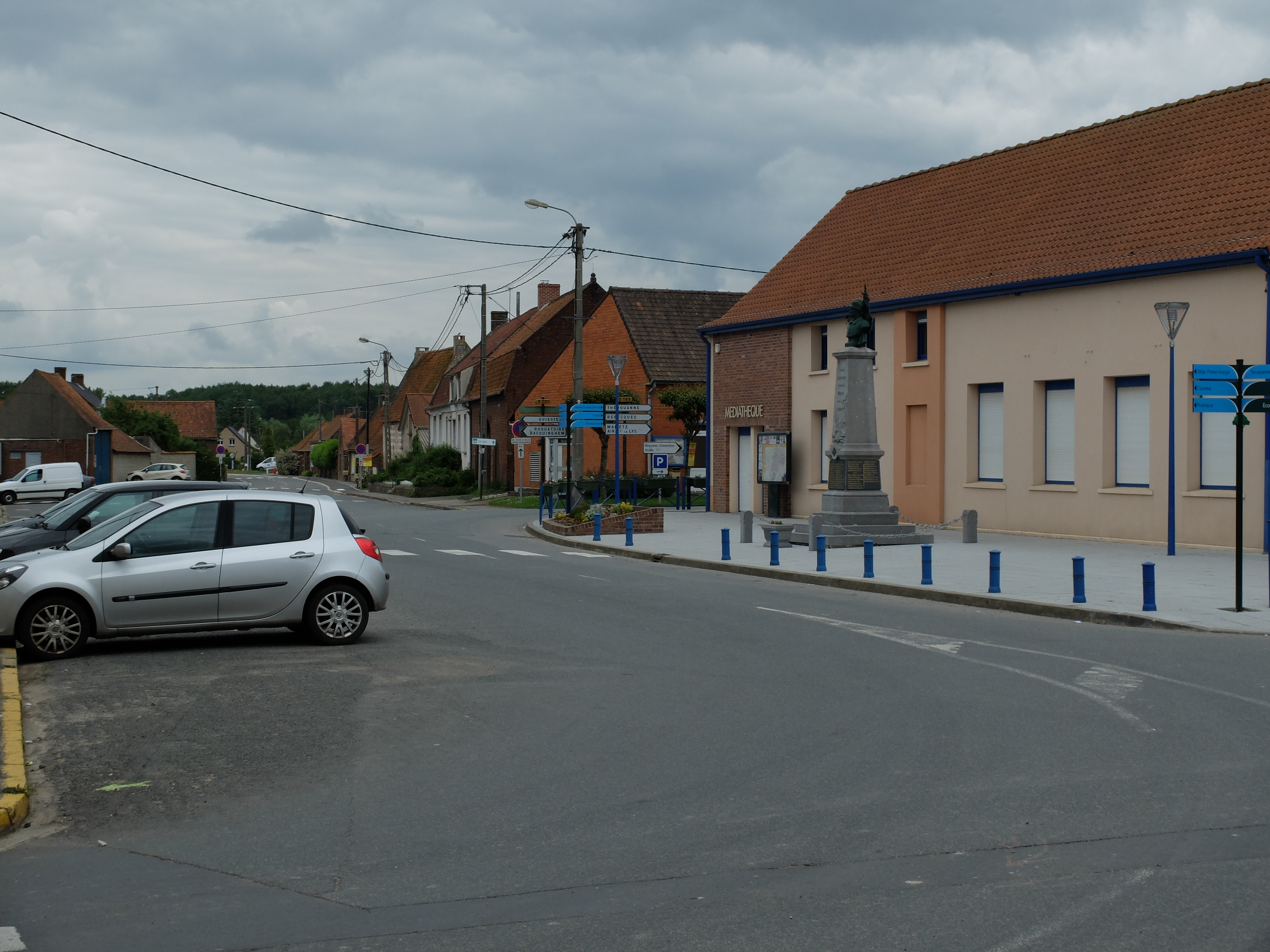
- The centre of Ecques

- Coat of arms
- Location of Ecques
- Location within France Location within Hauts-de-France
- Coordinates: 50°40′15″N 2°17′14″E
- Country: France
- Region: Hauts-de-France
- Department: Pas-de-Calais
- Arrondissement: Saint-Omer
- Canton: Fruges
- Intercommunality: Pays de Saint-Omer

Government
  - Mayor (2020–2026): Brigitte Merchier
- Area^{1}: 12.59 km^{2} (4.86 sq mi)
- Elevation: 26 m (85 ft)
- Highest elevation: 80 m (260 ft)
- Lowest elevation: 25 m (82 ft)
- Population (2023): 2,181
  - Density: 173.2/km^{2} (448.7/sq mi)
- Time zone: UTC+01:00 (CET)
  - Summer (DST): UTC+02:00 (CEST)
- INSEE/Postal code: 62288 /62129
- ^{1} French Land Register data, which excludes lakes, ponds, glaciers > 1 km^{2} (0.386 sq mi or 247 acres) and river estuaries.

Ecques (French pronunciation: [ɛk]; West Flemish: Eske) is a commune in the Pas-de-Calais department in the Hauts-de-France region of France.

== Geography ==
A large farming village situated 5 miles (8 km) south of Saint-Omer, at the D201 and D189 crossroads.

== Population ==
Historical population
| Year | Pop. | ±% p.a. |
|---|---|---|
| 1968 | 1,108 | — |
| 1975 | 1,124 | +0.21% |
| 1982 | 1,295 | +2.04% |
| 1990 | 1,637 | +2.97% |
| 1999 | 1,781 | +0.94% |
| 2007 | 1,930 | +1.01% |
| 2012 | 2,032 | +1.04% |
| 2017 | 2,139 | +1.03% |
| 2023 | 2,181 | +0.32% |
Source: INSEE

== Places of interest ==
- The church of St.Nicholas, dating from the twelfth century.

== See also ==
- Communes of the Pas-de-Calais department
