= Canton of Fruges =

Coordinates: 50.51528°N 2.13444°E

Fruges
- Canton
- Location of Fruges within the department
- Country: France
- Region: Hauts-de-France
- Department: Pas-de-Calais
- No. of communes: {{{nbcomm}}}
- Area: 457.91 km^{2} (176.80 sq mi)
- Population (2023): 31,229
  - Density: 68.199/km^{2} (176.63/sq mi)
- INSEE code: 62 25

The canton of Fruges ([fʁyʒ]; West Flemish: Frusje) is a canton situated in the Pas-de-Calais département and in the Hauts-de-France region of France.

== Geography ==
An area of small valleys and plateaux, consisting mostly of farmland, with the town of Fruges at its centre.

== Composition ==
At the French canton reorganisation which came into effect in March 2015, the canton was expanded from 25 to 55 communes (6 of which merged into the new communes Saint-Augustin, Bellinghem and Enquin-lez-Guinegatte):

- Ambricourt
- Audincthun
- Avondance
- Avroult
- Beaumetz-lès-Aire
- Bellinghem
- Bomy
- Canlers
- Coupelle-Neuve
- Coupelle-Vieille
- Coyecques
- Crépy
- Créquy
- Delettes
- Dennebrœucq
- Ecques
- Embry
- Enquin-lez-Guinegatte
- Erny-Saint-Julien
- Fauquembergues
- Febvin-Palfart
- Fléchin
- Fressin
- Fruges
- Heuringhem
- Hézecques
- Laires
- Lebiez
- Lugy
- Mametz
- Matringhem
- Mencas
- Merck-Saint-Liévin
- Planques
- Quiestède
- Racquinghem
- Radinghem
- Reclinghem
- Renty
- Rimboval
- Royon
- Ruisseauville
- Sains-lès-Fressin
- Saint-Augustin
- Saint-Martin-d'Hardinghem
- Senlis
- Thérouanne
- Thiembronne
- Torcy
- Verchin
- Vincly
- Wardrecques

== Population ==
Historical population
| Year | Pop. | ±% p.a. |
|---|---|---|
| 2013 | 31,184 | — |
| 2018 | 31,362 | +0.11% |
Source: INSEE

== See also ==
- Arrondissements of the Pas-de-Calais department
- Cantons of Pas-de-Calais
- Communes of Pas-de-Calais
