= Mametz, Pas-de-Calais =

Mametz
- Commune
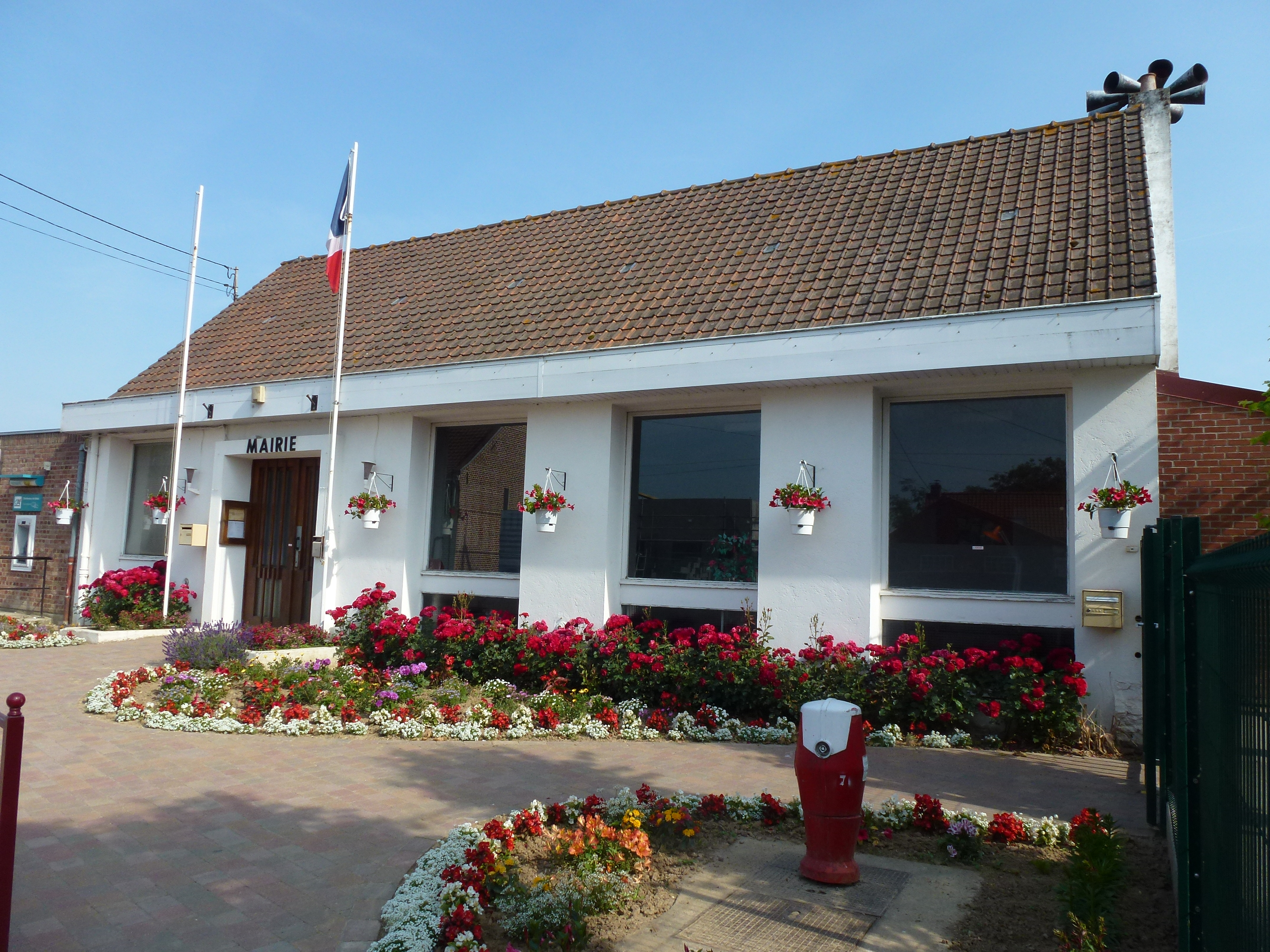
- The town hall of Mametz

- Coat of arms
- Location of Mametz
- Location within France Location within Hauts-de-France
- Coordinates: 50°38′06″N 2°19′34″E
- Country: France
- Region: Hauts-de-France
- Department: Pas-de-Calais
- Arrondissement: Saint-Omer
- Canton: Fruges
- Intercommunality: Pays de Saint-Omer

Government
  - Mayor (2022–2026): Laurence Fenes
- Area^{1}: 9.53 km^{2} (3.68 sq mi)
- Elevation: 44 m (144 ft)
- Highest elevation: 98 m (322 ft)
- Lowest elevation: 21 m (69 ft)
- Population (2023): 1,973
  - Density: 207/km^{2} (536/sq mi)
- Time zone: UTC+01:00 (CET)
  - Summer (DST): UTC+02:00 (CEST)
- INSEE/Postal code: 62543 /62120
- ^{1} French Land Register data, which excludes lakes, ponds, glaciers > 1 km^{2} (0.386 sq mi or 247 acres) and river estuaries.

Mametz (French pronunciation: [mame]; Picard: Mamouille) is a commune in the Pas-de-Calais department in the Hauts-de-France region of France.

== Geography ==
Mametz is locates about 10 miles (16 km) south of Saint-Omer, at the junction of the D157 and D197 roads. The commune was joined by the villages of Crecques and Marthes in 1822.

== Population ==
Historical population
| Year | Pop. | ±% p.a. |
|---|---|---|
| 1968 | 1,267 | — |
| 1975 | 1,291 | +0.27% |
| 1982 | 1,392 | +1.08% |
| 1990 | 1,567 | +1.49% |
| 1999 | 1,716 | +1.01% |
| 2007 | 1,899 | +1.27% |
| 2012 | 1,991 | +0.95% |
| 2017 | 1,997 | +0.06% |
| 2023 | 1,973 | −0.20% |
Source: INSEE

== Places of interest ==
- The church of St.Vaast, dating from the seventeenth century.
- The church of St. Honore at Crecques, dating from the nineteenth century.
- The church of St.Quentin at Marthes, dating from the nineteenth century.
- An old watermill, now restored.

== See also ==
- Communes of the Pas-de-Calais department
