= Heuringhem =

Heuringhe Horingem
- Commune
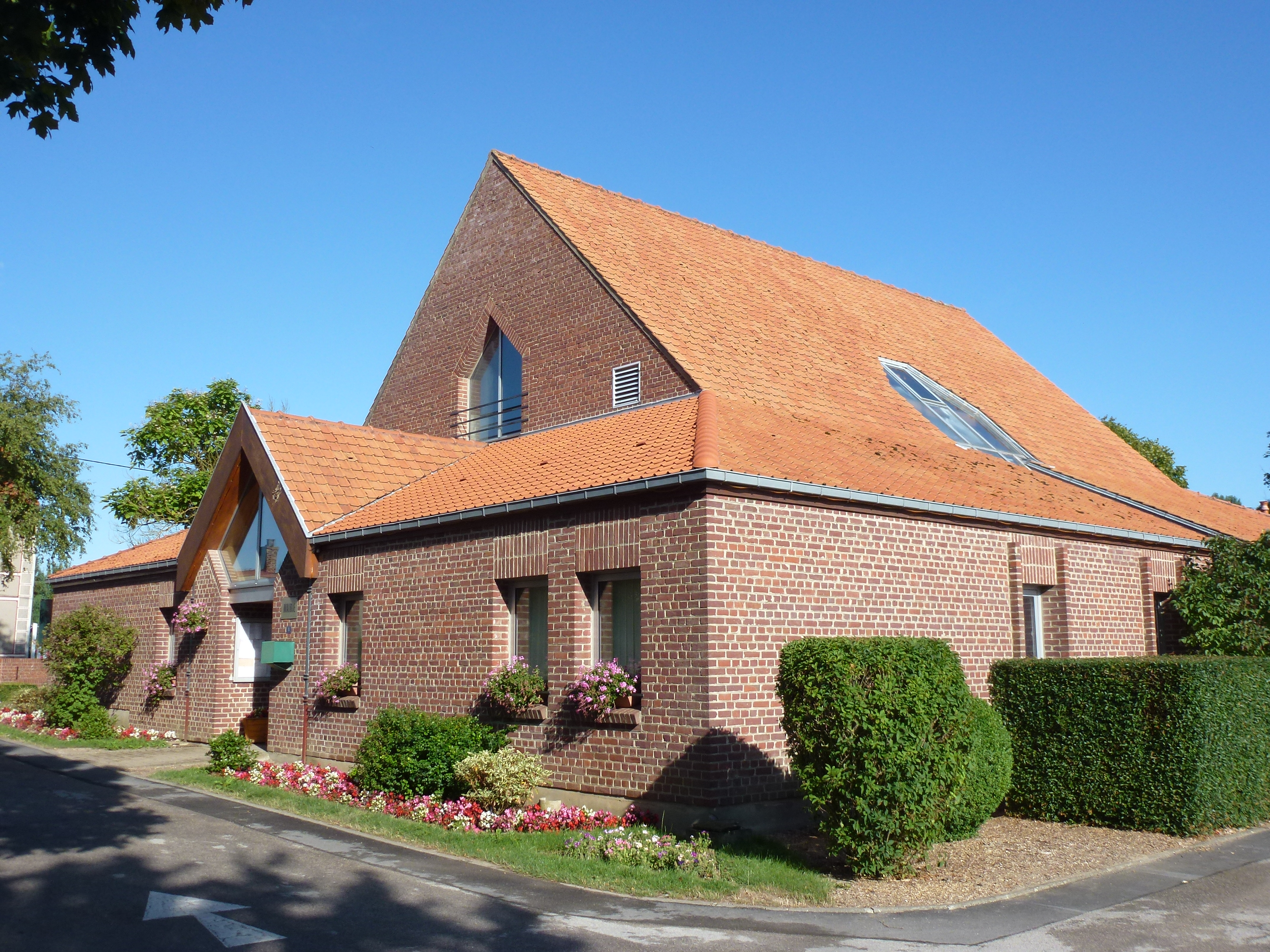
- The town hall of Heuringhem

- Coat of arms
- Location of Heuringhe
- Location within France Location within Hauts-de-France
- Coordinates: 50°41′44″N 2°17′00″E
- Country: France
- Region: Hauts-de-France
- Department: Pas-de-Calais
- Arrondissement: Saint-Omer
- Canton: Fruges
- Intercommunality: Pays de Saint-Omer

Government
  - Mayor (2023–2026): Stéphane Degremont
- Area^{1}: 5.79 km^{2} (2.24 sq mi)
- Elevation: 35 m (115 ft)
- Highest elevation: 84 m (276 ft)
- Lowest elevation: 25 m (82 ft)
- Population (2023): 1,389
  - Density: 240/km^{2} (621/sq mi)
- Time zone: UTC+01:00 (CET)
  - Summer (DST): UTC+02:00 (CEST)
- INSEE/Postal code: 62452 /62575
- ^{1} French Land Register data, which excludes lakes, ponds, glaciers > 1 km^{2} (0.386 sq mi or 247 acres) and river estuaries.

Heuringhem (French pronunciation: [øʁɛ̃ɡɛm]; West Flemish: Horingem) is a commune in the Pas-de-Calais department in the Hauts-de-France region of France.

Heuringhem is twinned with Sandhurst, Kent.

== Geography ==
A village situated 4 miles (6 km) south of Saint-Omer, at the D195 and D477 crossroads.

== Population ==
Historical population
Year	Pop.	±% p.a.
1968	588	—
1975	660	+1.66%
1982	924	+4.92%
1990	1,212	+3.45%
1999	1,287	+0.67%
2007	1,307	+0.19%
2012	1,325	+0.27%
2017	1,339	+0.21%
2023	1,389	+0.61%
Source: INSEE

== Places of interest ==
- The church of St.Riquier, dating from the seventeenth century.

== See also ==
- Communes of the Pas-de-Calais department
