= Delettes =

- Commune
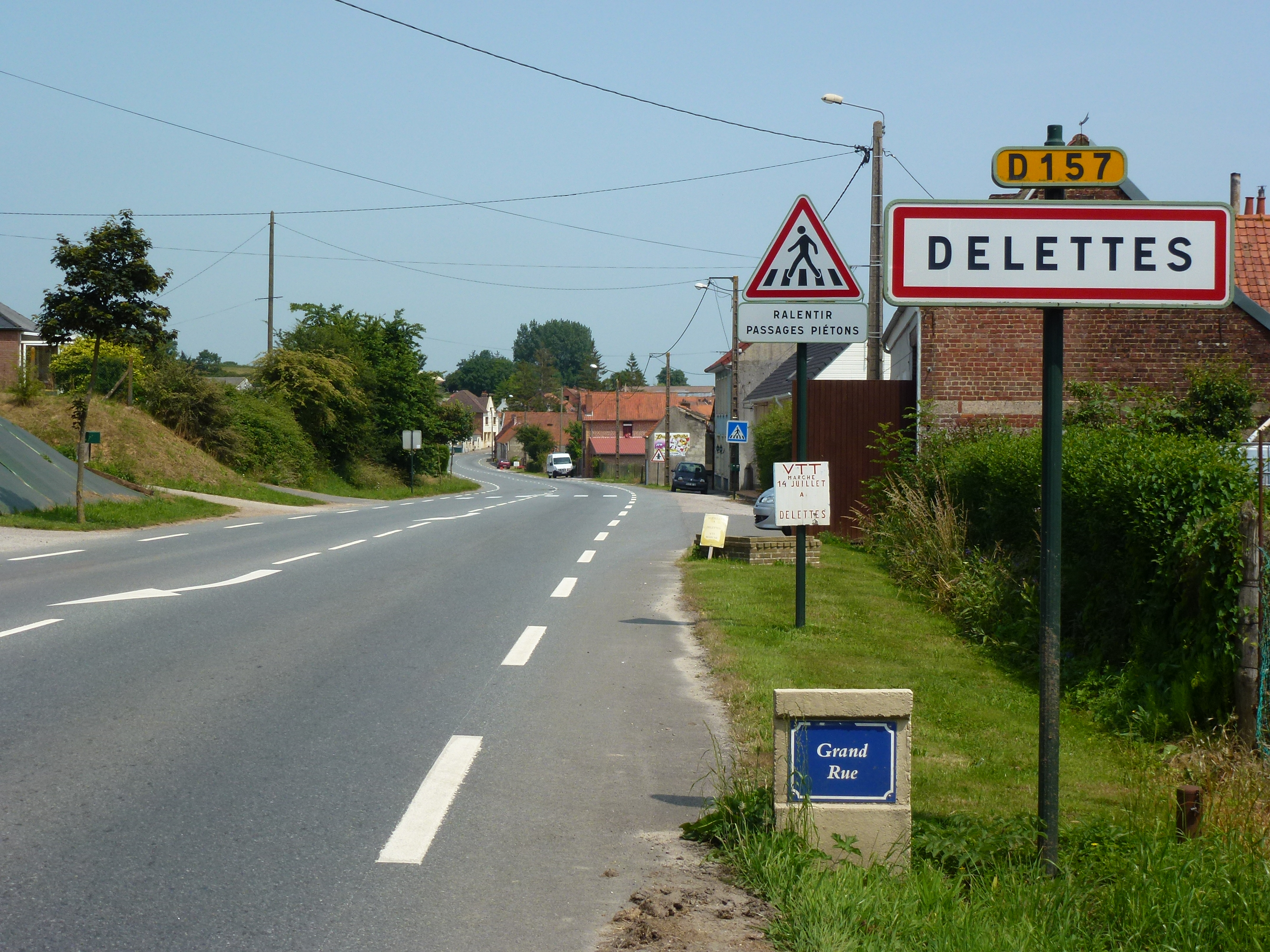
- The road into Delettes

- Coat of arms
- Location of Delettes
- Location within France Location within Hauts-de-France
- Coordinates: 50°37′06″N 2°12′50″E
- Country: France
- Region: Hauts-de-France
- Department: Pas-de-Calais
- Arrondissement: Saint-Omer
- Canton: Fruges
- Intercommunality: Pays de Saint-Omer

Government
  - Mayor (2020–2026): Alain Massez
- Area^{1}: 14.69 km^{2} (5.67 sq mi)
- Elevation: 54 m (177 ft)
- Highest elevation: 138 m (453 ft)
- Lowest elevation: 36 m (118 ft)
- Population (2023): 1,124
  - Density: 76.51/km^{2} (198.2/sq mi)
- Time zone: UTC+01:00 (CET)
  - Summer (DST): UTC+02:00 (CEST)
- INSEE/Postal code: 62265 /62129
- ^{1} French Land Register data, which excludes lakes, ponds, glaciers > 1 km^{2} (0.386 sq mi or 247 acres) and river estuaries.

Delettes (French pronunciation: [dəlɛt]) is a commune in the Pas-de-Calais department in the Hauts-de-France region of France 9 miles (14 km) south of Saint-Omer. The river Lys flows by the commune.

== Population ==
Historical population
Year	Pop.	±% p.a.
1968	742	—
1975	743	+0.02%
1982	821	+1.44%
1990	912	+1.32%
1999	912	+0.00%
2007	1,059	+1.89%
2012	1,156	+1.77%
2017	1,178	+0.38%
2023	1,124	−0.78%
Source: INSEE

== See also ==
- Communes of the Pas-de-Calais department
