= Erny-Saint-Julien =

Erny-Saint-Julien Erni
- Commune
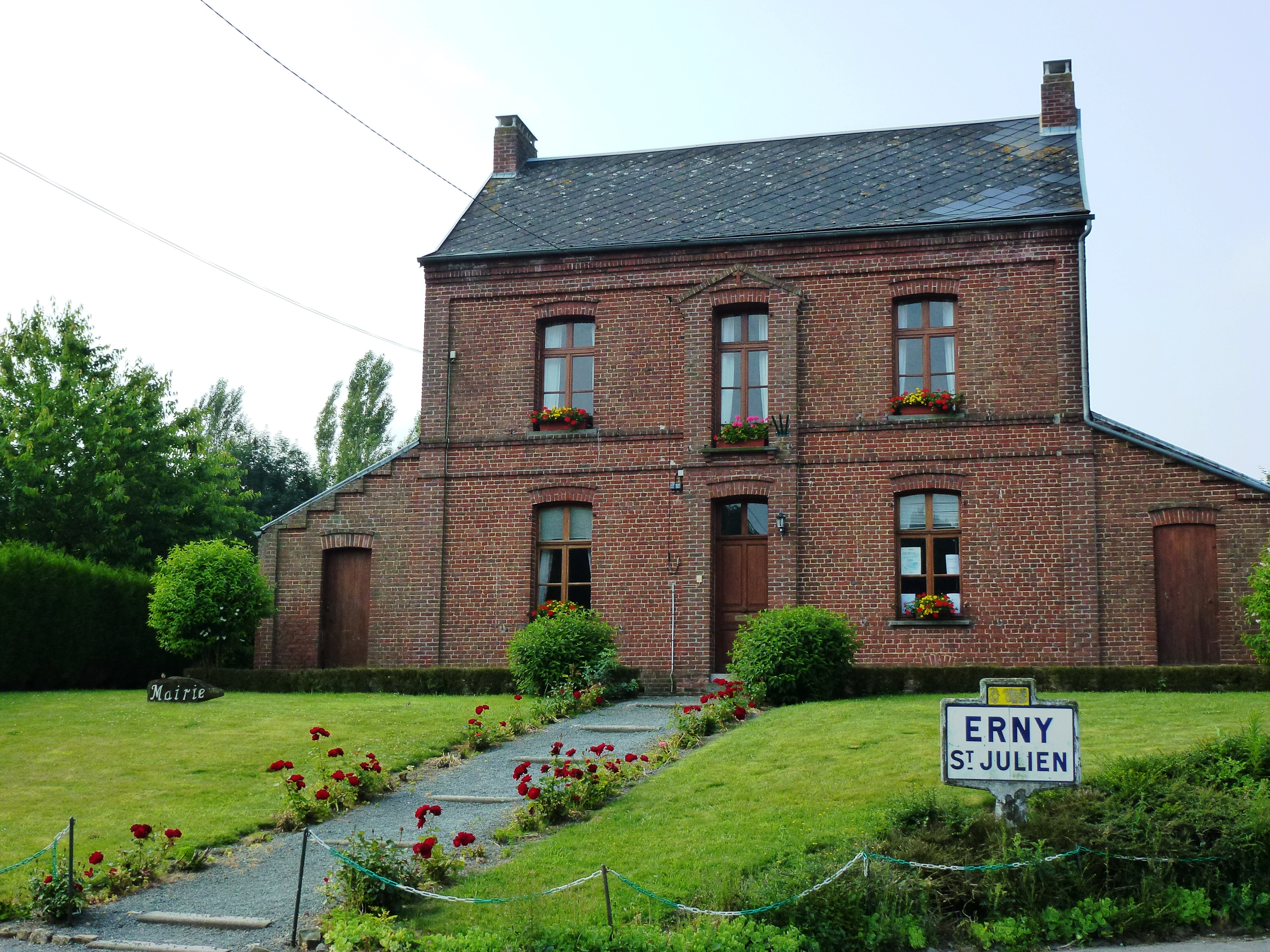
- The town hall of Erny-Saint-Julien

- Coat of arms
- Location of Erny-Saint-Julien
- Location within France Location within Hauts-de-France
- Coordinates: 50°35′11″N 2°15′19″E
- Country: France
- Region: Hauts-de-France
- Department: Pas-de-Calais
- Arrondissement: Saint-Omer
- Canton: Fruges
- Intercommunality: Pays de Saint-Omer

Government
  - Mayor (2020–2026): Jean-Claude Dupont
- Area^{1}: 5.41 km^{2} (2.09 sq mi)
- Elevation: 76 m (249 ft)
- Highest elevation: 173 m (568 ft)
- Lowest elevation: 66 m (217 ft)
- Population (2023): 338
  - Density: 62.5/km^{2} (162/sq mi)
- Time zone: UTC+01:00 (CET)
  - Summer (DST): UTC+02:00 (CEST)
- INSEE/Postal code: 62304 /62960
- ^{1} French Land Register data, which excludes lakes, ponds, glaciers > 1 km^{2} (0.386 sq mi or 247 acres) and river estuaries.

Erny-Saint-Julien (French pronunciation: [ɛʁni sɛ̃ ʒyljɛ̃]; Picard: Arny-Saint-Julien; West Flemish: Erni) is a commune in the Pas-de-Calais department in the Hauts-de-France region of France.

== Geography ==
A farming village situated 15 km (9.3 mi) southeast of Saint-Omer, at the D158 and D193 crossroads. It is surrounded by the communes Bomy, Enquin-les-Mines and Fléchin.

== Population ==
Historical population
Year	Pop.	±% p.a.
1968	348	—
1975	317	−1.32%
1982	312	−0.23%
1990	301	−0.45%
1999	288	−0.49%
2007	286	−0.09%
2012	342	+3.64%
2017	325	−1.01%
2023	338	+0.66%
Source: INSEE

== Places of interest ==
- The church of St.Julien, dating from the nineteenth century, with some Gallo-Roman finds in the foundations.
- Traces of an ancient château.

== See also ==
- Communes of the Pas-de-Calais department
