= Wardrecques =

Wardrecques Werdrik
- Commune
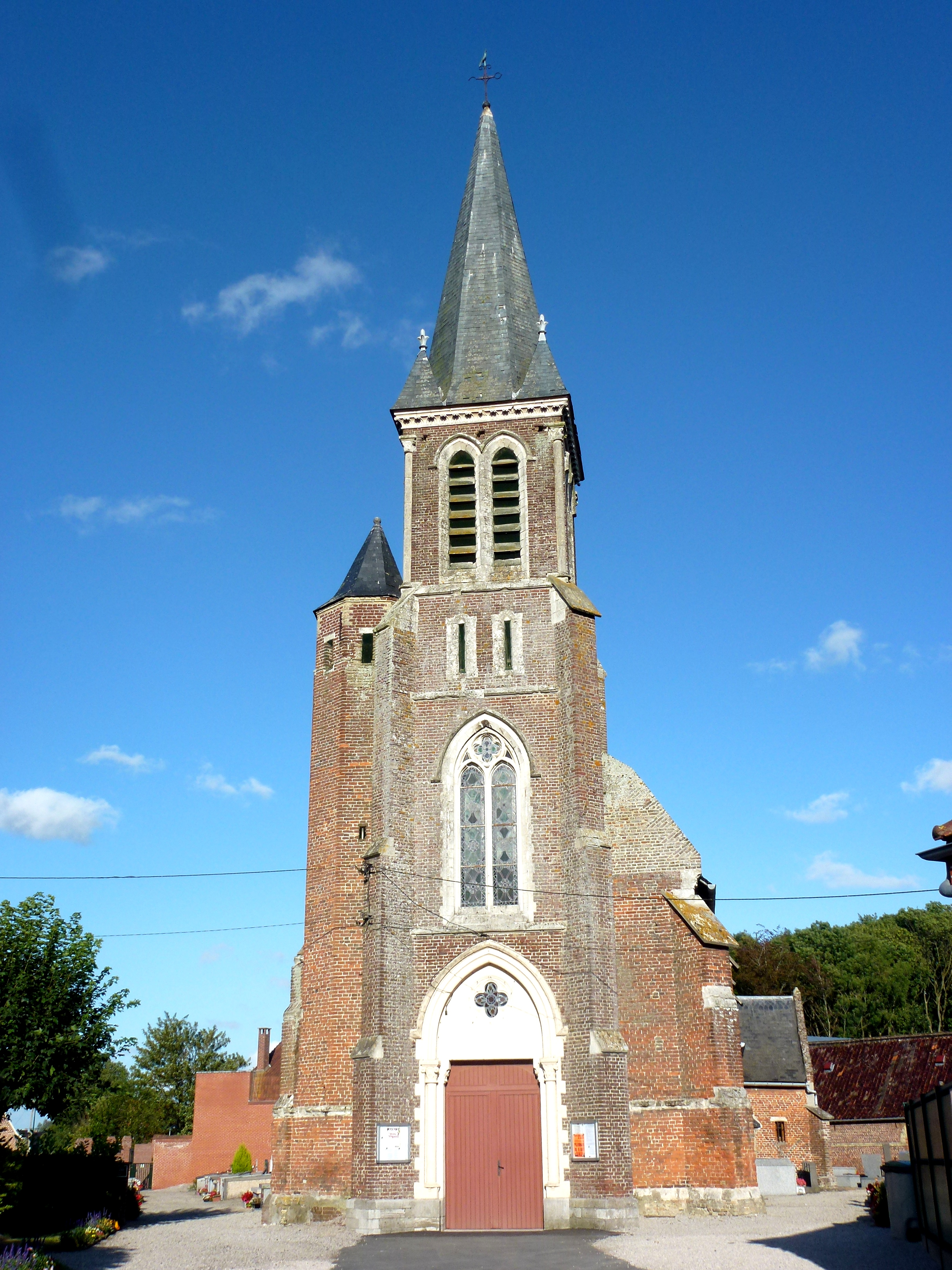
- The church of Wardrecques

- Coat of arms
- Location of Wardrecques
- Location within France Location within Hauts-de-France
- Coordinates: 50°42′40″N 2°20′41″E
- Country: France
- Region: Hauts-de-France
- Department: Pas-de-Calais
- Arrondissement: Saint-Omer
- Canton: Fruges
- Intercommunality: Pays de Saint-Omer

Government
  - Mayor (2020–2026): Louis Cainne
- Area^{1}: 3.72 km^{2} (1.44 sq mi)
- Elevation: 24 m (79 ft)
- Highest elevation: 69 m (226 ft)
- Lowest elevation: 21 m (69 ft)
- Population (2023): 1,328
  - Density: 357/km^{2} (925/sq mi)
- Time zone: UTC+01:00 (CET)
  - Summer (DST): UTC+02:00 (CEST)
- INSEE/Postal code: 62875 /62120
- ^{1} French Land Register data, which excludes lakes, ponds, glaciers > 1 km^{2} (0.386 sq mi or 247 acres) and river estuaries.

Wardrecques (French pronunciation: [waʁdʁɛk]; West Flemish: Werdrik) is a commune in the Pas-de-Calais department in the Hauts-de-France region of France. 6 miles (9 km) southeast of Saint-Omer a hundred yards from the Neufossé Canal.

== Population ==
Historical population
Year	Pop.	±% p.a.
1968	530	—
1975	541	+0.29%
1982	946	+8.31%
1990	1,034	+1.12%
1999	1,068	+0.36%
2007	1,153	+0.96%
2012	1,189	+0.62%
2017	1,333	+2.31%
2023	1,328	−0.06%
Source: INSEE

== See also ==
- Communes of the Pas-de-Calais department
