= Reclinghem =

Reclinghem Reklingem
- Commune
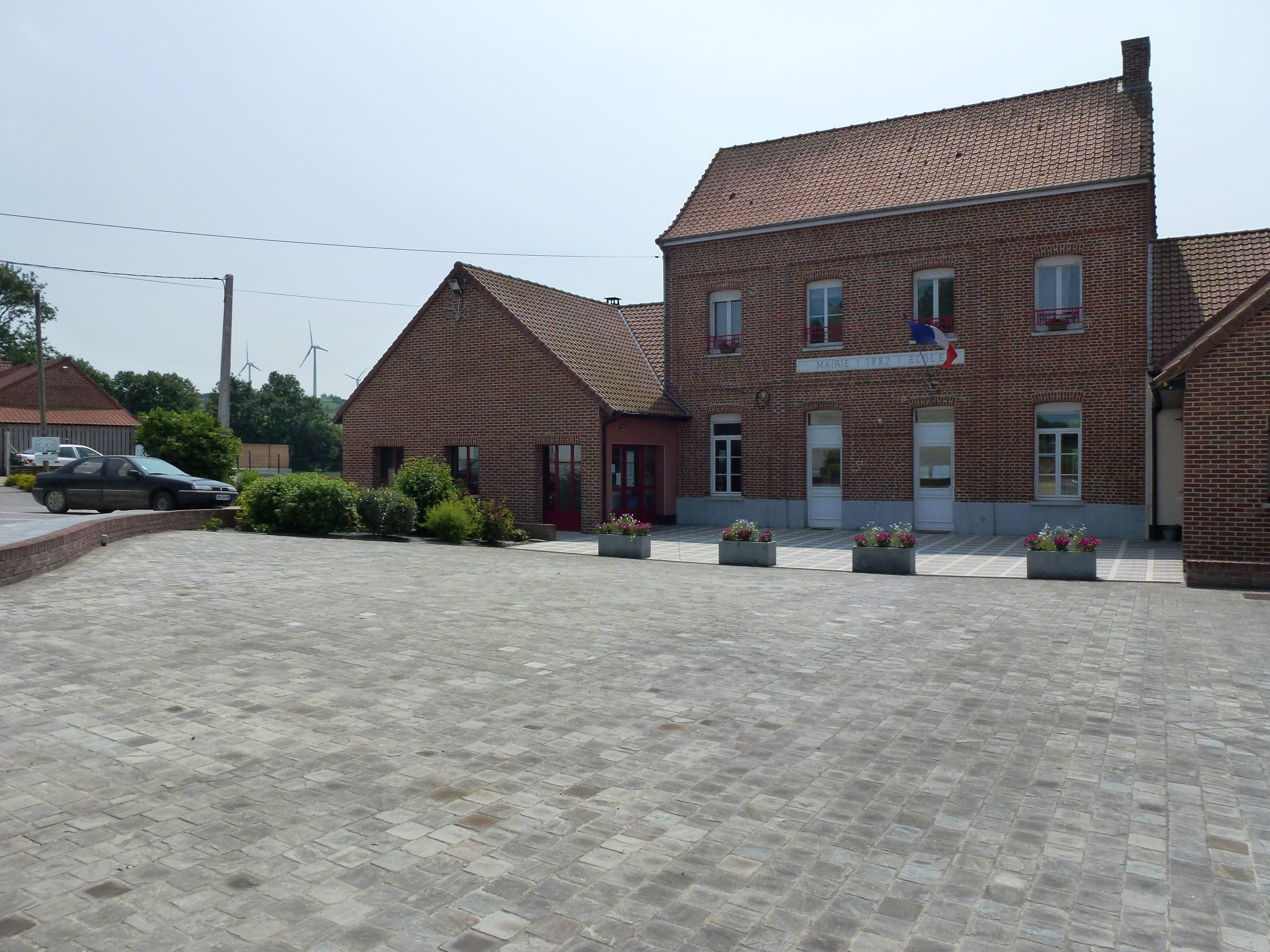
- The town hall and school of Reclinghem

- Coat of arms
- Location of Reclinghem
- Location within France Location within Hauts-de-France
- Coordinates: 50°34′26″N 2°10′37″E
- Country: France
- Region: Hauts-de-France
- Department: Pas-de-Calais
- Arrondissement: Saint-Omer
- Canton: Fruges
- Intercommunality: Pays de Saint-Omer

Government
  - Mayor (2020–2026): Joël Rolin
- Area^{1}: 6.05 km^{2} (2.34 sq mi)
- Elevation: 87 m (285 ft)
- Highest elevation: 176 m (577 ft)
- Lowest elevation: 54 m (177 ft)
- Population (2023): 238
  - Density: 39.3/km^{2} (102/sq mi)
- Time zone: UTC+01:00 (CET)
  - Summer (DST): UTC+02:00 (CEST)
- INSEE/Postal code: 62696 /62560
- ^{1} French Land Register data, which excludes lakes, ponds, glaciers > 1 km^{2} (0.386 sq mi or 247 acres) and river estuaries.

Reclinghem (French pronunciation: [ʁəklɛ̃ɡɑ̃]; West Flemish: Reklingem) is a commune in the Pas-de-Calais department in the Hauts-de-France region of France. It was settled by the Viking Rikiwulf (the rich and powerful wolf) in the 9th century, who probably also settled nearby Richebourg and Rijkeghem in present Tielt, Belgium.

== Geography ==
Reclinghem lies about 12 miles (19 km) south of Saint-Omer, on the D104 road, by the banks of the river Lys.

== Population ==
Historical population
Year	Pop.	±% p.a.
1968	176	—
1975	135	−3.72%
1982	142	+0.72%
1990	153	+0.94%
1999	144	−0.67%
2007	175	+2.47%
2012	220	+4.68%
2017	241	+1.84%
2023	238	−0.21%
Source: INSEE

== Places of interest ==
- The eighteenth century church of St. Firmin.

== See also ==
- Communes of the Pas-de-Calais department
