= Avroult =

- Commune
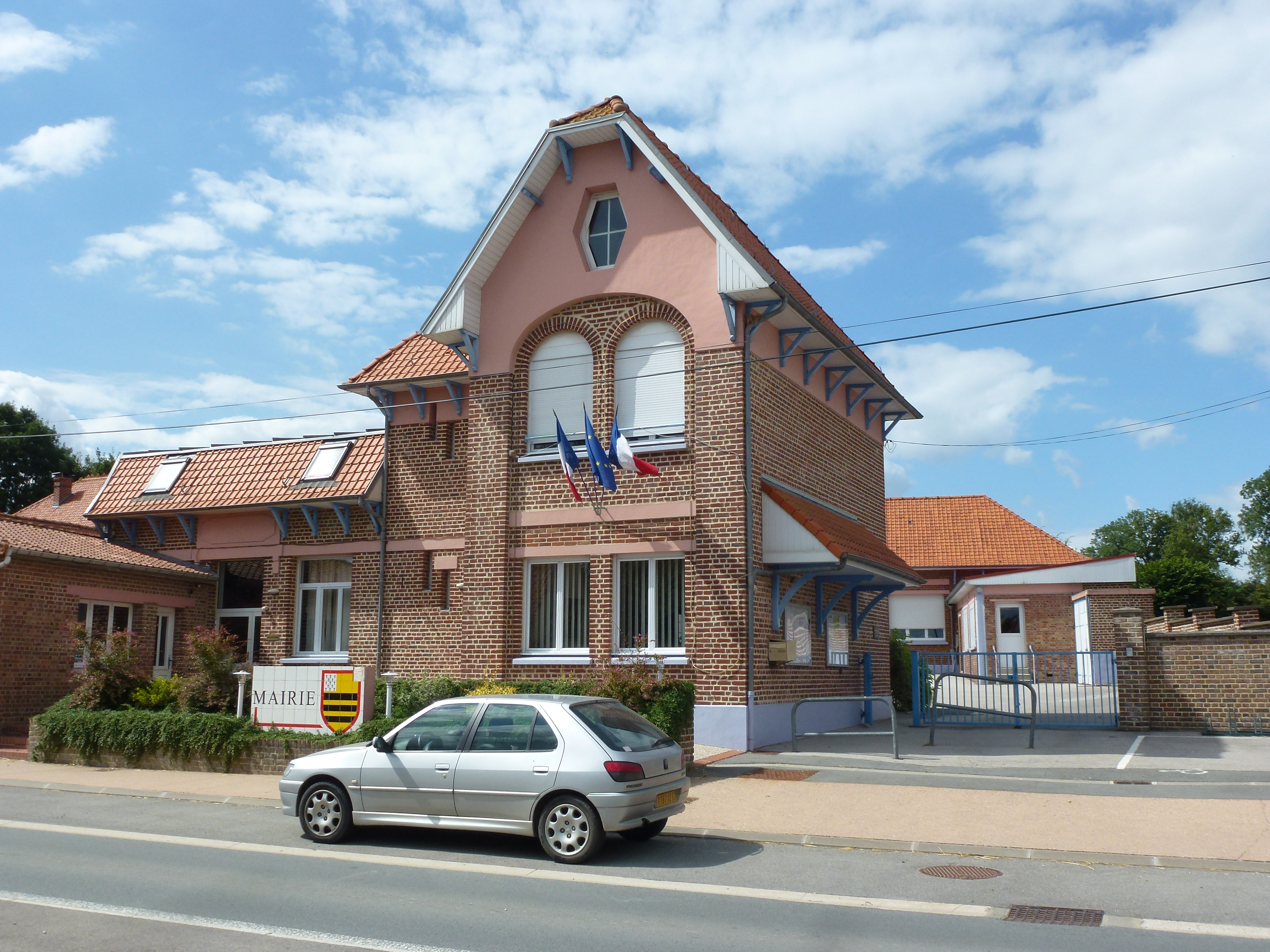
- The town hall of Avroult

- Coat of arms
- Location of Avroult
- Location within France Location within Hauts-de-France
- Coordinates: 50°38′02″N 2°08′53″E
- Country: France
- Region: Hauts-de-France
- Department: Pas-de-Calais
- Arrondissement: Saint-Omer
- Canton: Fruges
- Intercommunality: CA Pays de Saint-Omer

Government
  - Mayor (2020–2026): Isabelle Lemaire
- Area^{1}: 4.78 km^{2} (1.85 sq mi)
- Elevation: 141 m (463 ft)
- Highest elevation: 161 m (528 ft)
- Lowest elevation: 104 m (341 ft)
- Population (2023): 536
  - Density: 112/km^{2} (290/sq mi)
- Time zone: UTC+01:00 (CET)
  - Summer (DST): UTC+02:00 (CEST)
- INSEE/Postal code: 62067 /62560
- ^{1} French Land Register data, which excludes lakes, ponds, glaciers > 1 km^{2} (0.386 sq mi or 247 acres) and river estuaries.

Avroult (West Flemish: Averhout) is a commune in the Pas-de-Calais department in northern France.

== Geography ==
A village located 10 miles (16 km) southwest of Saint-Omer, at the junction of the D928 with the D133 road.

== Population ==
Historical population
Year	Pop.	±% p.a.
1968	286	—
1975	282	−0.20%
1982	327	+2.14%
1990	416	+3.05%
1999	510	+2.29%
2007	531	+0.51%
2012	568	+1.36%
2017	607	+1.34%
2023	536	−2.05%
Source: INSEE

== Sights ==
- The sixteenth century church of St. Omer.

== See also ==
- Communes of the Pas-de-Calais department
