= Merck-Saint-Liévin =

- Commune
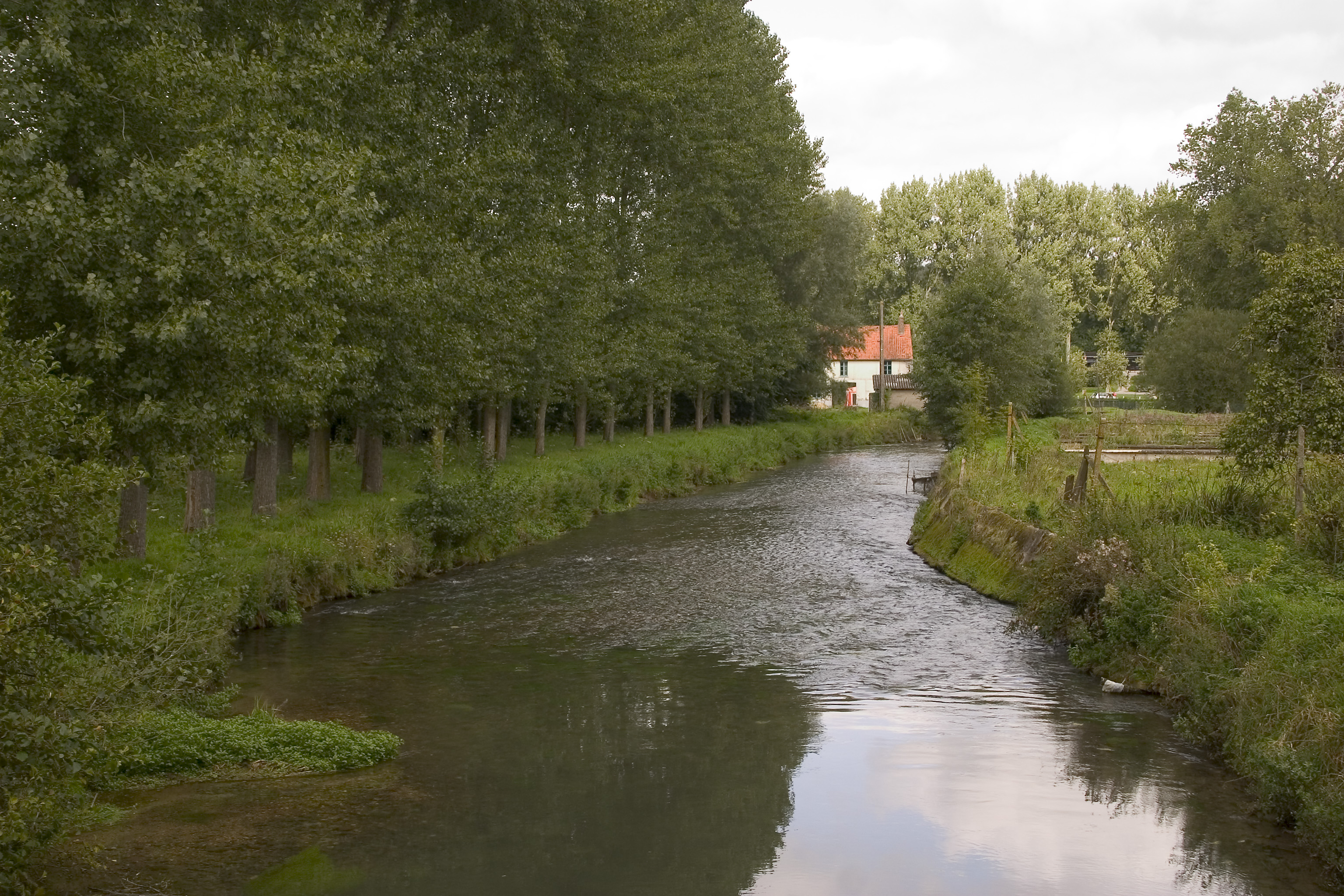
- Aa river

- Coat of arms
- Location of Merck-Saint-Liévin
- Location within France Location within Hauts-de-France
- Coordinates: 50°37′40″N 2°06′55″E
- Country: France
- Region: Hauts-de-France
- Department: Pas-de-Calais
- Arrondissement: Saint-Omer
- Canton: Fruges
- Intercommunality: Pays de Saint-Omer

Government
  - Mayor (2020–2026): Philippe Hochart
- Area^{1}: 11.85 km^{2} (4.58 sq mi)
- Elevation: 68 m (223 ft)
- Highest elevation: 172 m (564 ft)
- Lowest elevation: 56 m (184 ft)
- Population (2023): 655
  - Density: 55.3/km^{2} (143/sq mi)
- Time zone: UTC+01:00 (CET)
  - Summer (DST): UTC+02:00 (CEST)
- INSEE/Postal code: 62569 /62560
- ^{1} French Land Register data, which excludes lakes, ponds, glaciers > 1 km^{2} (0.386 sq mi or 247 acres) and river estuaries.

Merck-Saint-Liévin (French pronunciation: [mɛʁk sɛ̃ ljevɛ̃]; Picard: Merck-Saint-Lévin; West Flemish: Sint-Lievens-Merk) is a commune in the Pas-de-Calais department in the Hauts-de-France region of France about 10 miles (16 km) southwest of Saint-Omer. The river Aa flows through the village.

== Population ==
Historical population
Year	Pop.	±% p.a.
1968	550	—
1975	547	−0.08%
1982	514	−0.88%
1990	517	+0.07%
1999	507	−0.22%
2007	569	+1.45%
2012	620	+1.73%
2017	656	+1.14%
2023	655	−0.03%
Source: INSEE

== Transport ==
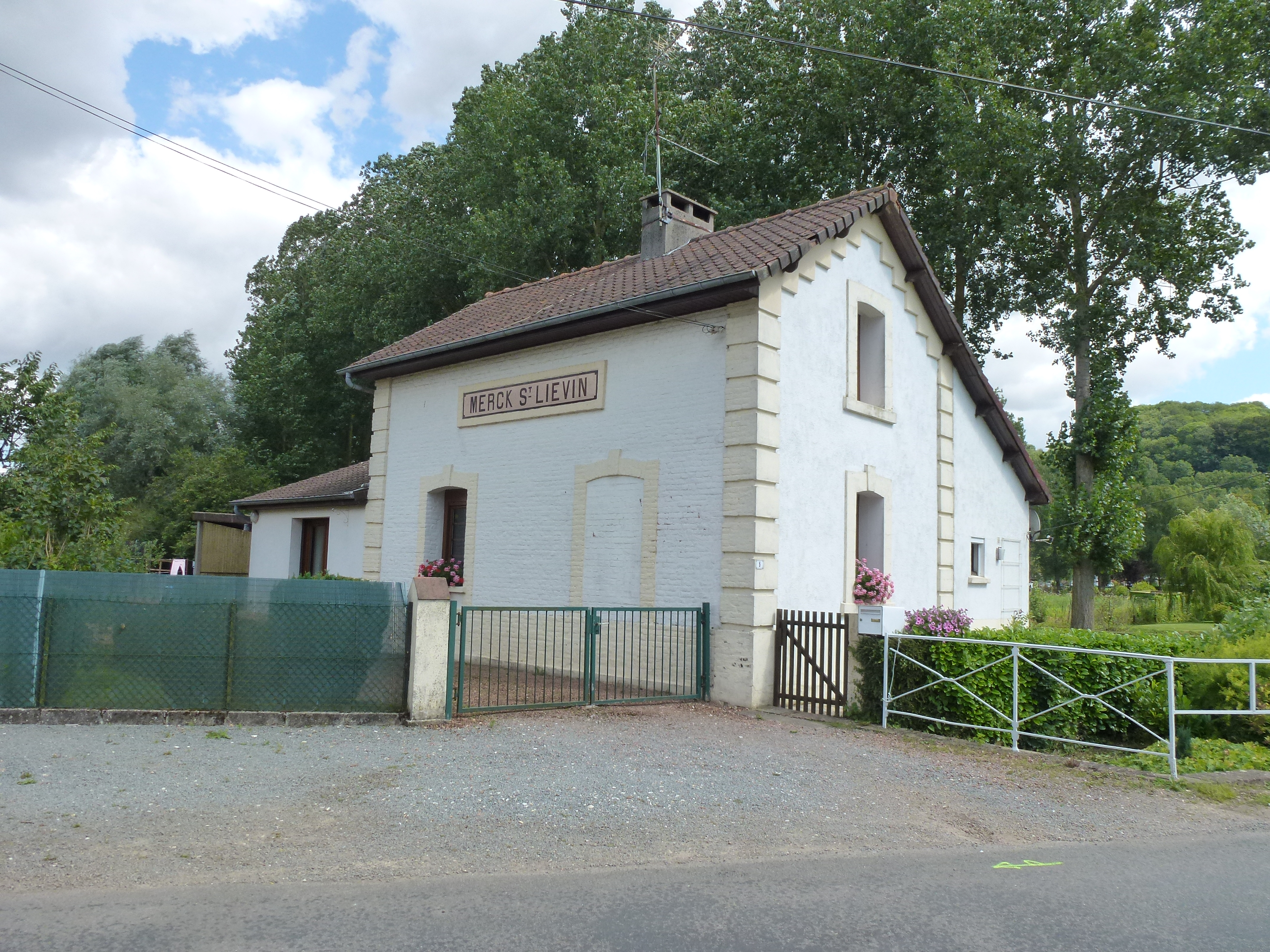
The station building, 2013.

The Chemin de fer d'Anvin à Calais opened a railway station at Merck-Saint-Lièvin in 1881. The railway was closed in 1955.

== See also ==
- Communes of the Pas-de-Calais department
