= Audincthun =

- Commune
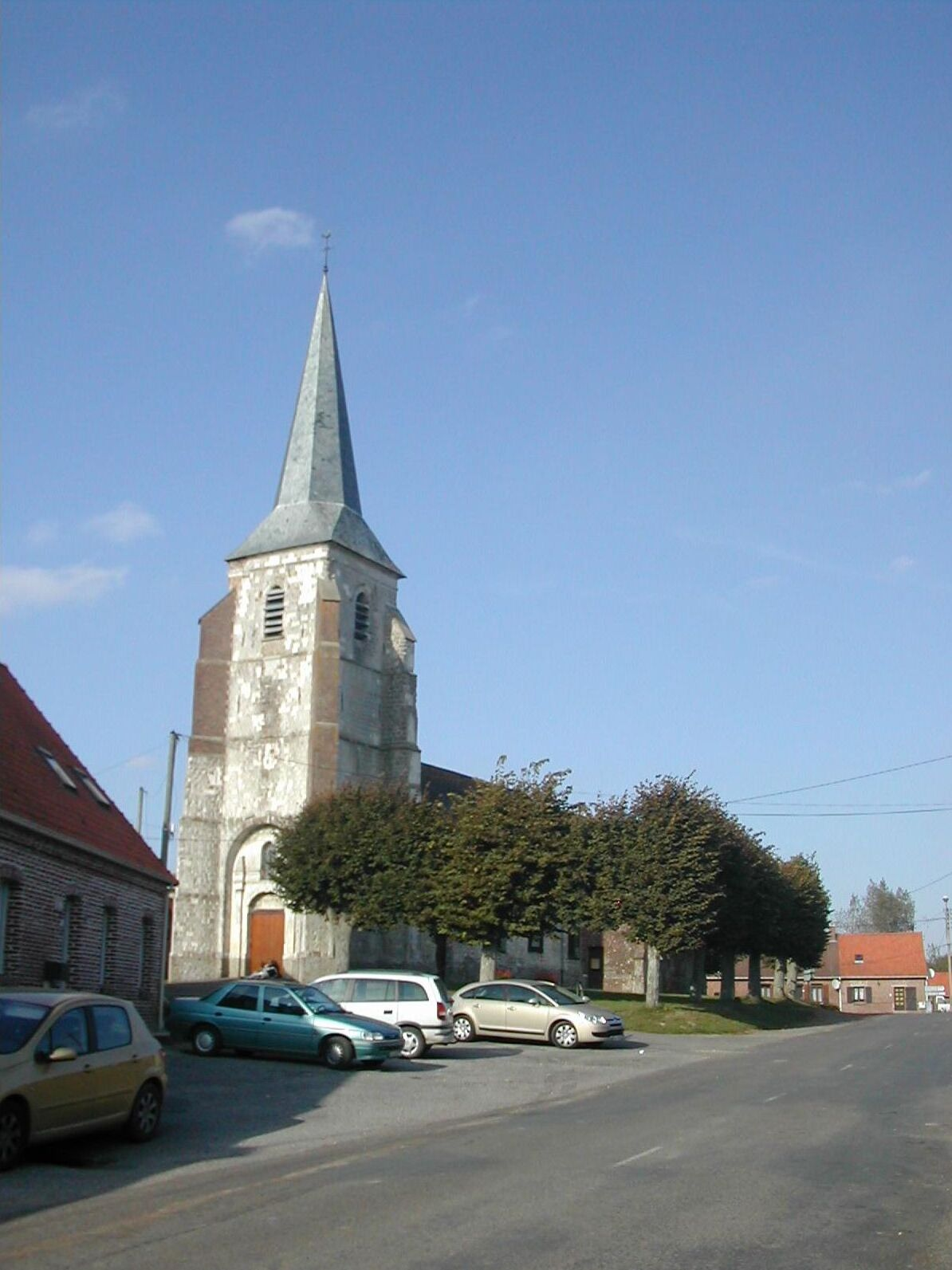
- The church of Audincthun

- Coat of arms
- Location of Audincthun
- Location within France Location within Hauts-de-France
- Coordinates: 50°35′10″N 2°08′20″E
- Country: France
- Region: Hauts-de-France
- Department: Pas-de-Calais
- Arrondissement: Saint-Omer
- Canton: Fruges
- Intercommunality: CA Pays de Saint-Omer

Government
  - Mayor (2023–2026): Samuel Dubelloy
- Area^{1}: 15.26 km^{2} (5.89 sq mi)
- Elevation: 64 m (210 ft)
- Highest elevation: 183 m (600 ft)
- Lowest elevation: 64 m (210 ft)
- Population (2023): 684
  - Density: 44.8/km^{2} (116/sq mi)
- Time zone: UTC+01:00 (CET)
  - Summer (DST): UTC+02:00 (CEST)
- INSEE/Postal code: 62053 /62560
- ^{1} French Land Register data, which excludes lakes, ponds, glaciers > 1 km^{2} (0.386 sq mi or 247 acres) and river estuaries.

Audincthun (French pronunciation: [odɛ̃ktœ̃]; Dutch: Odingten) is a commune in the Pas-de-Calais department in northern France.

== Geography ==
A town located 20 miles (32 km) northeast of Montreuil-sur-Mer, at the junction of the D92 with the D133 road.

== Population ==
Historical population
Year	Pop.	±% p.a.
1968	555	—
1975	543	−0.31%
1982	563	+0.52%
1990	578	+0.33%
1999	574	−0.08%
2007	651	+1.59%
2012	641	−0.31%
2017	664	+0.71%
2023	684	+0.50%
Source: INSEE

== Personalities ==
- Albert de Dion, French automobile manufacturer (de Dion-Bouton), is buried in the family vault here.

== Sights ==
- The fifteenth century church of St. Pierre.
- The eighteenth century church of St. Nicholas.
- The Sainte-Soyette Chapel.
- A line of 13 wind turbines are on the hills above the commune.

== See also ==
- Communes of the Pas-de-Calais department
