= Laires =

Laires Laren
- Commune
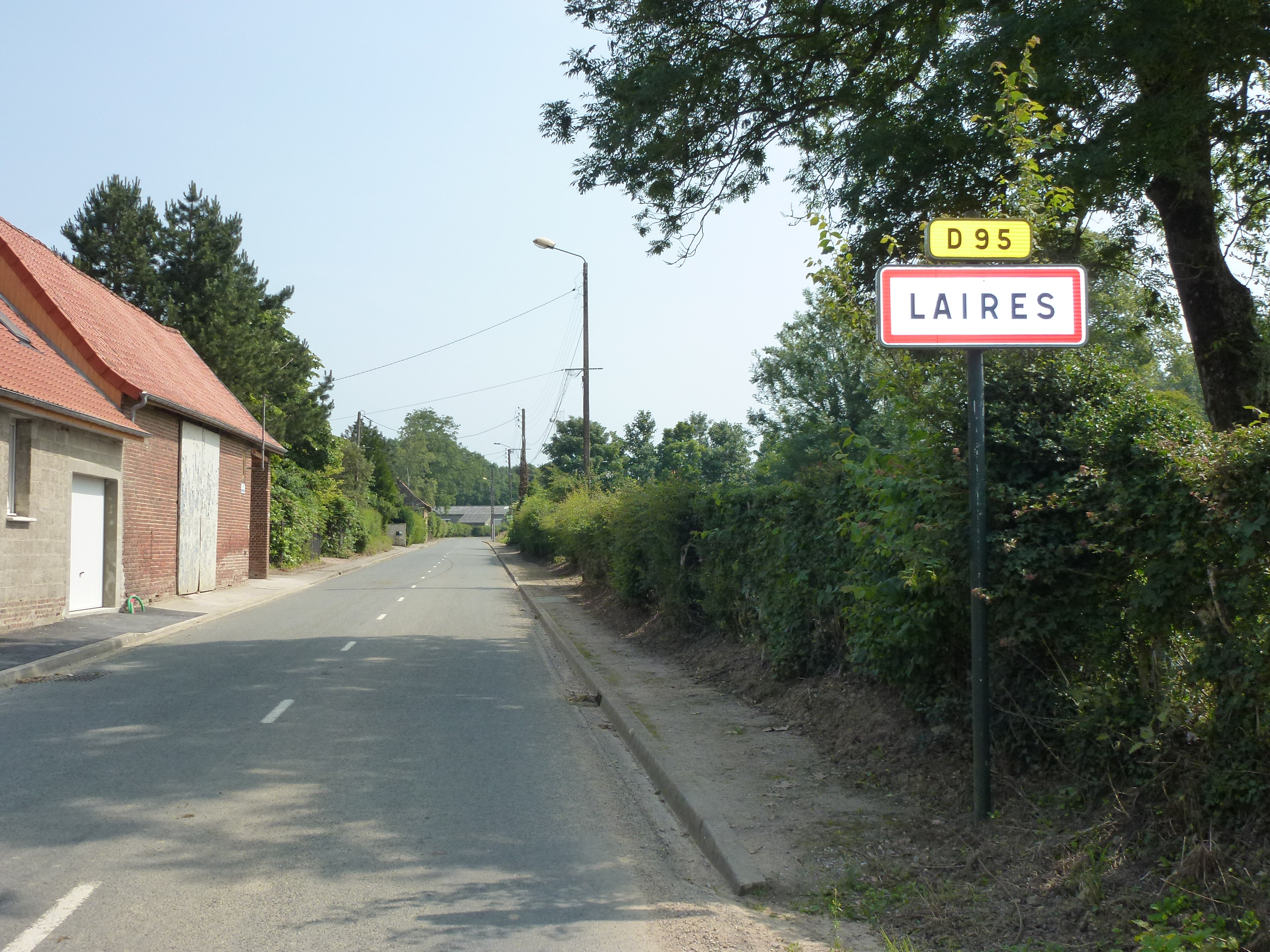
- The road into Laires

- Coat of arms
- Location of Laires
- Location within France Location within Hauts-de-France
- Coordinates: 50°32′28″N 2°15′23″E
- Country: France
- Region: Hauts-de-France
- Department: Pas-de-Calais
- Arrondissement: Saint-Omer
- Canton: Fruges
- Intercommunality: Pays de Saint-Omer

Government
  - Mayor (2020–2026): Eric Lagache
- Area^{1}: 8.64 km^{2} (3.34 sq mi)
- Elevation: 182 m (597 ft)
- Highest elevation: 190 m (620 ft)
- Lowest elevation: 140 m (460 ft)
- Population (2023): 365
  - Density: 42.2/km^{2} (109/sq mi)
- Time zone: UTC+01:00 (CET)
  - Summer (DST): UTC+02:00 (CEST)
- INSEE/Postal code: 62485 /62960
- ^{1} French Land Register data, which excludes lakes, ponds, glaciers > 1 km^{2} (0.386 sq mi or 247 acres) and river estuaries.

Laires (French pronunciation: [lɛʁ]; West Flemish: Laren) is a commune in the Pas-de-Calais department in the Hauts-de-France region of France 24 km (15 mi) south of Saint-Omer. It is surrounded by the communes Beaumetz-lès-Aire, Prédefin and Fléchin.

== Population ==
Historical population
Year	Pop.	±% p.a.
1968	347	—
1975	302	−1.96%
1982	314	+0.56%
1990	337	+0.89%
1999	297	−1.39%
2007	308	+0.46%
2012	359	+3.11%
2017	364	+0.28%
2023	365	+0.05%
Source: INSEE

== See also ==
- Communes of the Pas-de-Calais department
