= Thiembronne =

Thiembronne Teenbronne
- Commune
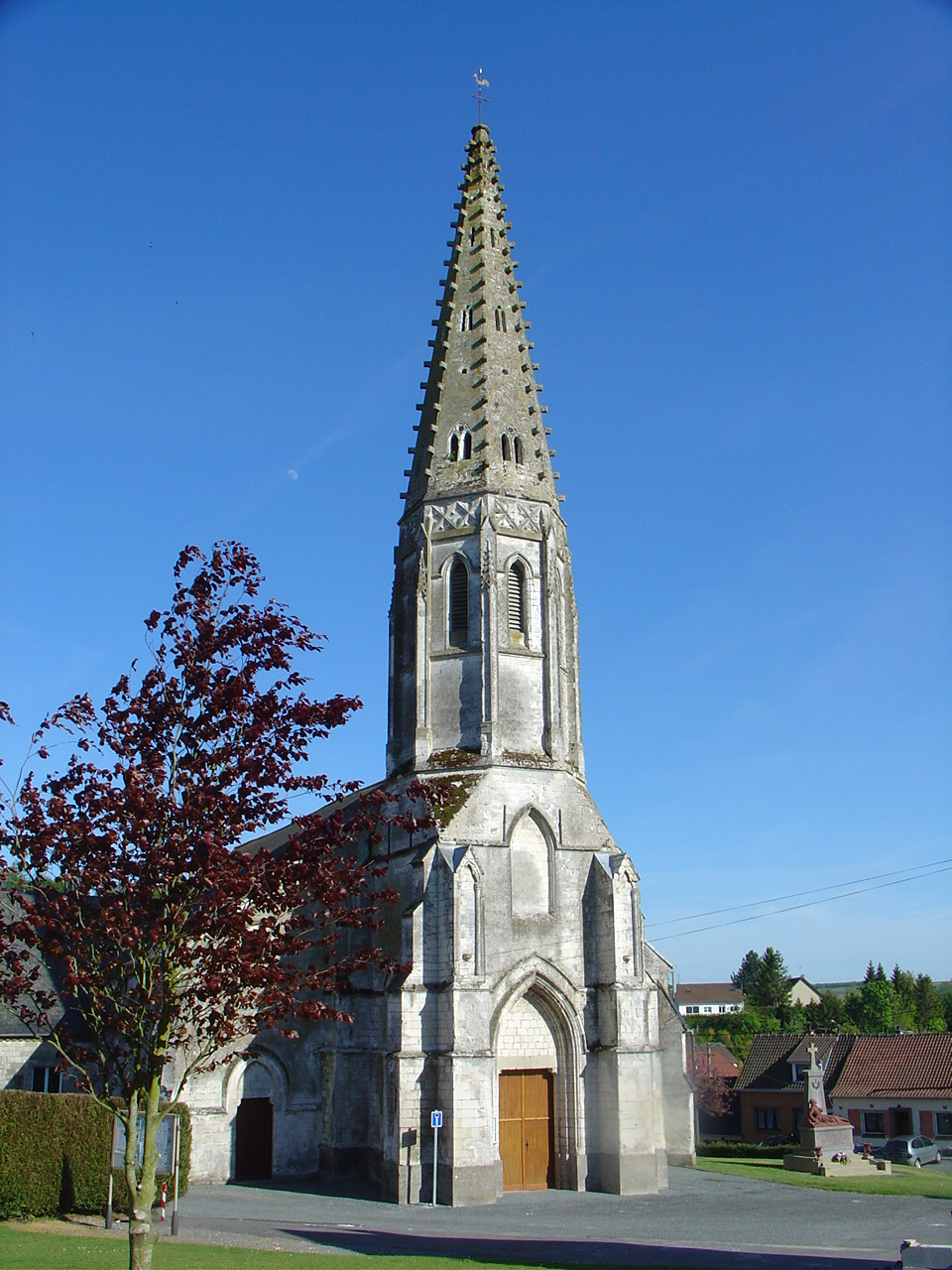
- The church of Thiembronne

- Coat of arms
- Location of Thiembronne
- Location within France Location within Hauts-de-France
- Coordinates: 50°37′16″N 2°03′30″E
- Country: France
- Region: Hauts-de-France
- Department: Pas-de-Calais
- Arrondissement: Saint-Omer
- Canton: Fruges
- Intercommunality: Pays de Saint-Omer

Government
  - Mayor (2020–2026): Didier Dewamin
- Area^{1}: 22.82 km^{2} (8.81 sq mi)
- Elevation: 160 m (520 ft)
- Highest elevation: 201 m (659 ft)
- Lowest elevation: 76 m (249 ft)
- Population (2023): 815
  - Density: 35.7/km^{2} (92.5/sq mi)
- Time zone: UTC+01:00 (CET)
  - Summer (DST): UTC+02:00 (CEST)
- INSEE/Postal code: 62812 /62560
- ^{1} French Land Register data, which excludes lakes, ponds, glaciers > 1 km^{2} (0.386 sq mi or 247 acres) and river estuaries.

Thiembronne (French pronunciation: [tjɑ̃bʁɔn]; West Flemish: Teenbronne) is a commune in the Pas-de-Calais department in the Hauts-de-France region of France.

== Geography ==
Thiembronne is located 15 miles (24 km) southwest of Saint-Omer, on the D158 and D132 road junction.

== Population ==
Historical population
Year	Pop.	±% p.a.
1968	694	—
1975	645	−1.04%
1982	621	−0.54%
1990	597	−0.49%
1999	621	+0.44%
2007	687	+1.27%
2012	808	+3.30%
2017	834	+0.64%
2023	815	−0.38%
Source: INSEE

== Places of interest ==
- The church of Saint Pierre, dating from the nineteenth century.
- The nineteenth-century château.
- The remains of the medieval château, destroyed in 1595.

== See also ==
- Communes of the Pas-de-Calais department
