= Fléchin =

- Commune
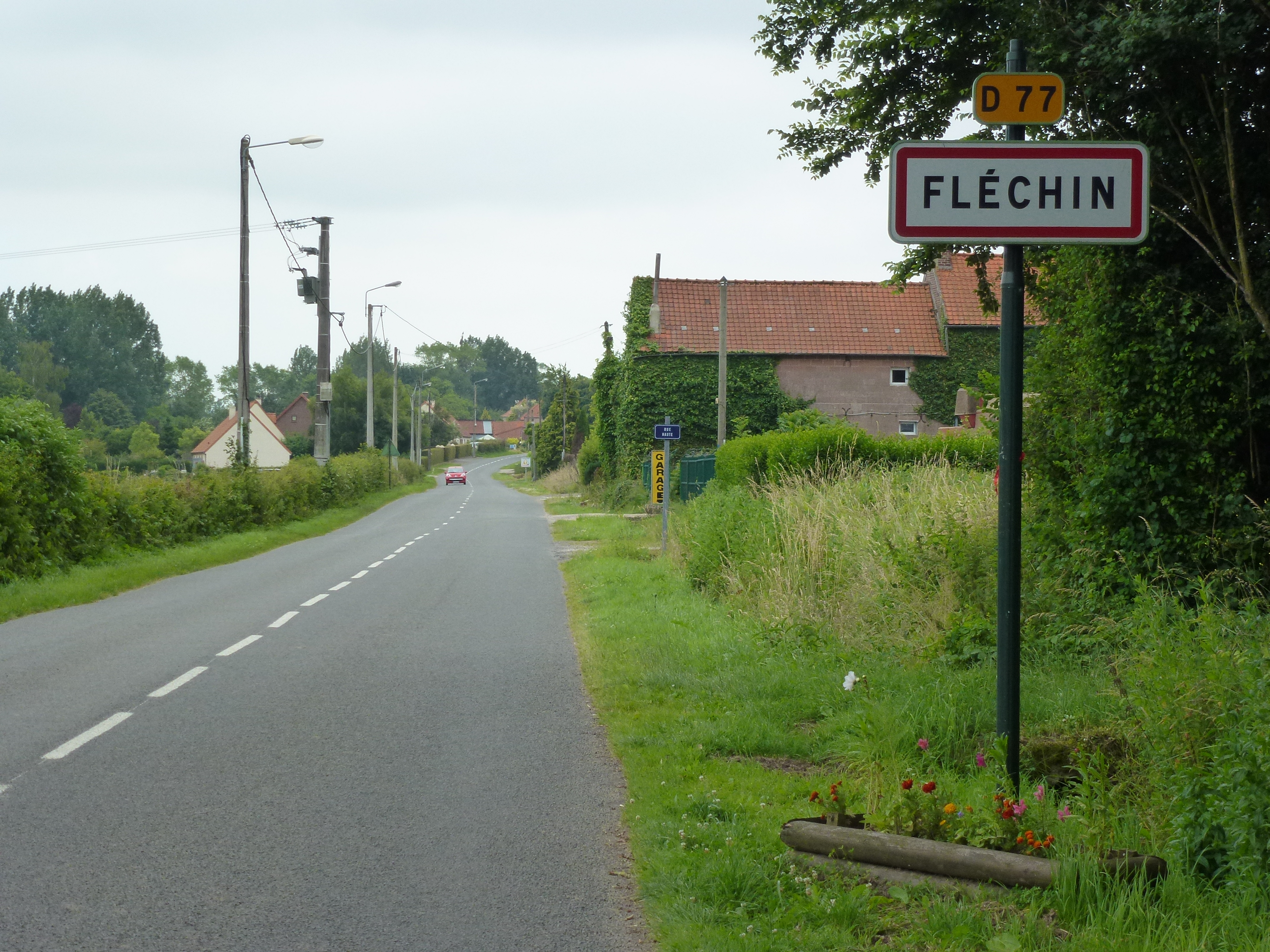
- The road into Fléchin

- Coat of arms
- Location of Fléchin
- Location within France Location within Hauts-de-France
- Coordinates: 50°33′34″N 2°17′37″E
- Country: France
- Region: Hauts-de-France
- Department: Pas-de-Calais
- Arrondissement: Saint-Omer
- Canton: Fruges
- Intercommunality: Pays de Saint-Omer

Government
  - Mayor (2020–2026): Jacqueline Dumetz
- Area^{1}: 10.99 km^{2} (4.24 sq mi)
- Elevation: 86 m (282 ft)
- Highest elevation: 178 m (584 ft)
- Lowest elevation: 62 m (203 ft)
- Population (2023): 469
  - Density: 42.7/km^{2} (111/sq mi)
- Time zone: UTC+01:00 (CET)
  - Summer (DST): UTC+02:00 (CEST)
- INSEE/Postal code: 62336 /62960
- ^{1} French Land Register data, which excludes lakes, ponds, glaciers > 1 km^{2} (0.386 sq mi or 247 acres) and river estuaries.

Fléchin (French pronunciation: [fleʃɛ̃]) is a commune in the Pas-de-Calais department in the Hauts-de-France region of France 13 miles (21 km) south of Saint-Omer.

It is surrounded by the communes Febvin-Palfart, Enquin-les-Mines and Laires, Fléchin is 20 km northwest of Bruay-la-Buissière.

== Population ==
Historical population
Year	Pop.	±% p.a.
1968	601	—
1975	575	−0.63%
1982	532	−1.10%
1990	470	−1.54%
1999	454	−0.38%
2007	545	+2.31%
2012	506	−1.47%
2017	479	−1.09%
2023	469	−0.35%
Source: INSEE

== Notable people ==
- Charles Jonnart (1857–1927), French politician, was born there.

== See also ==
- Communes of the Pas-de-Calais department
