= Fauquembergues =

Fauquembergues Valkenberg
- Commune
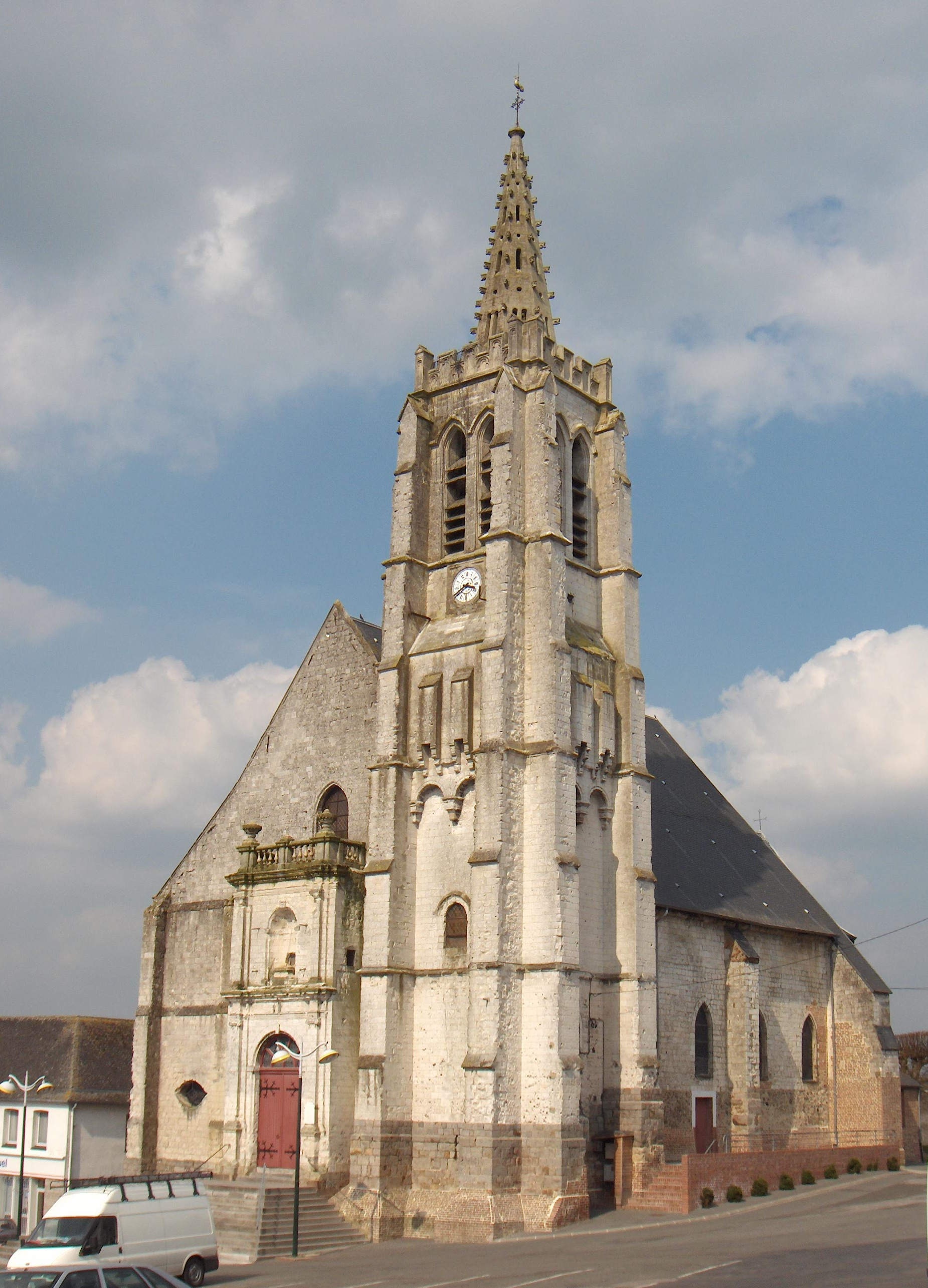
- The church of Fauquembergues

- Coat of arms
- Location of Fauquembergues
- Location within France Location within Hauts-de-France
- Coordinates: 50°36′06″N 2°05′57″E
- Country: France
- Region: Hauts-de-France
- Department: Pas-de-Calais
- Arrondissement: Saint-Omer
- Canton: Fruges
- Intercommunality: Pays de Saint-Omer

Government
  - Mayor (2020–2026): Alain Mequignon
- Area^{1}: 7.13 km^{2} (2.75 sq mi)
- Elevation: 78 m (256 ft)
- Highest elevation: 186 m (610 ft)
- Lowest elevation: 72 m (236 ft)
- Population (2023): 932
  - Density: 131/km^{2} (339/sq mi)
- Time zone: UTC+01:00 (CET)
  - Summer (DST): UTC+02:00 (CEST)
- INSEE/Postal code: 62325 /62560
- ^{1} French Land Register data, which excludes lakes, ponds, glaciers > 1 km^{2} (0.386 sq mi or 247 acres) and river estuaries.

Fauquembergues (French pronunciation: [fokɑ̃bɛʁɡ]; West Flemish: Valkenberg; Picard: Fauquimbergue) is a commune in the Pas-de-Calais department in the Hauts-de-France region of France. First mentioned in 961 as "in monten qui dicitur Falcoberg", the place later in 1124 was called Falkenberga. In 1347, an English raiding force under Henry of Grosmont razed the settlement to the ground.

== Geography ==
A town situated 10 miles (16 km) southwest of Saint-Omer, at the junction of the D928 with two minor roads, the D92 and the D158. The river Aa flows through Fauquembergues.

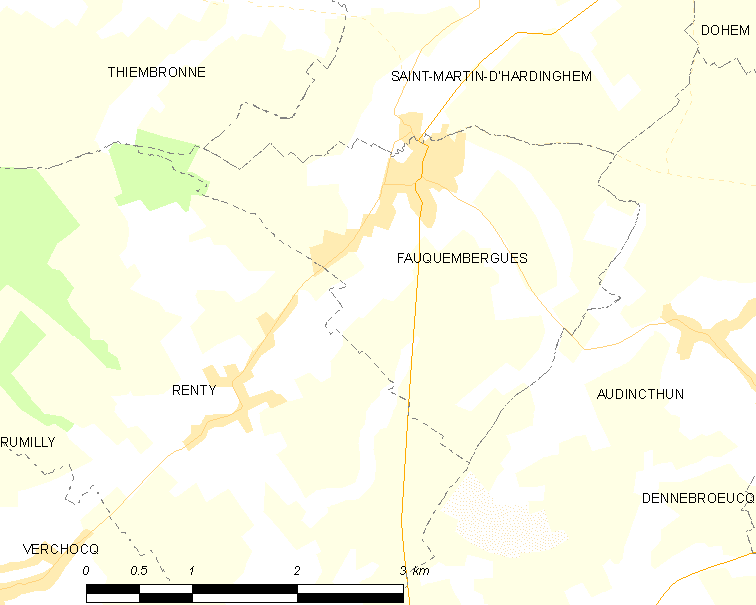
Map of the commune and the adjacent places

== Population ==
Historical population
Year	Pop.	±% p.a.
1968	942	—
1975	901	−0.63%
1982	884	−0.27%
1990	845	−0.56%
1999	856	+0.14%
2007	962	+1.47%
2012	1,005	+0.88%
2017	984	−0.42%
2023	932	−0.90%
Source: INSEE

== Places and monuments ==
- A line of 13 electricity-generating turbines can be seen on the 100 m high hills. Another group of 12 turbines faces the town from the southern direction.
- The 13th-century church of Saint-Léger which is a registered historical monument

== Notable people ==
- Hugh of Falkenberg, 12th century (Hugues de Fauquembergues)
- Pierre-Alexandre Monsigny (1729–1817), composer

== Transport ==
The Chemin de fer d'Anvin à Calais opened a railway station at Fauquembergues in 1881. The railway was closed in 1955.

== See also ==
- Communes of the Pas-de-Calais department
