= Beaumetz-lès-Aire =

- Commune
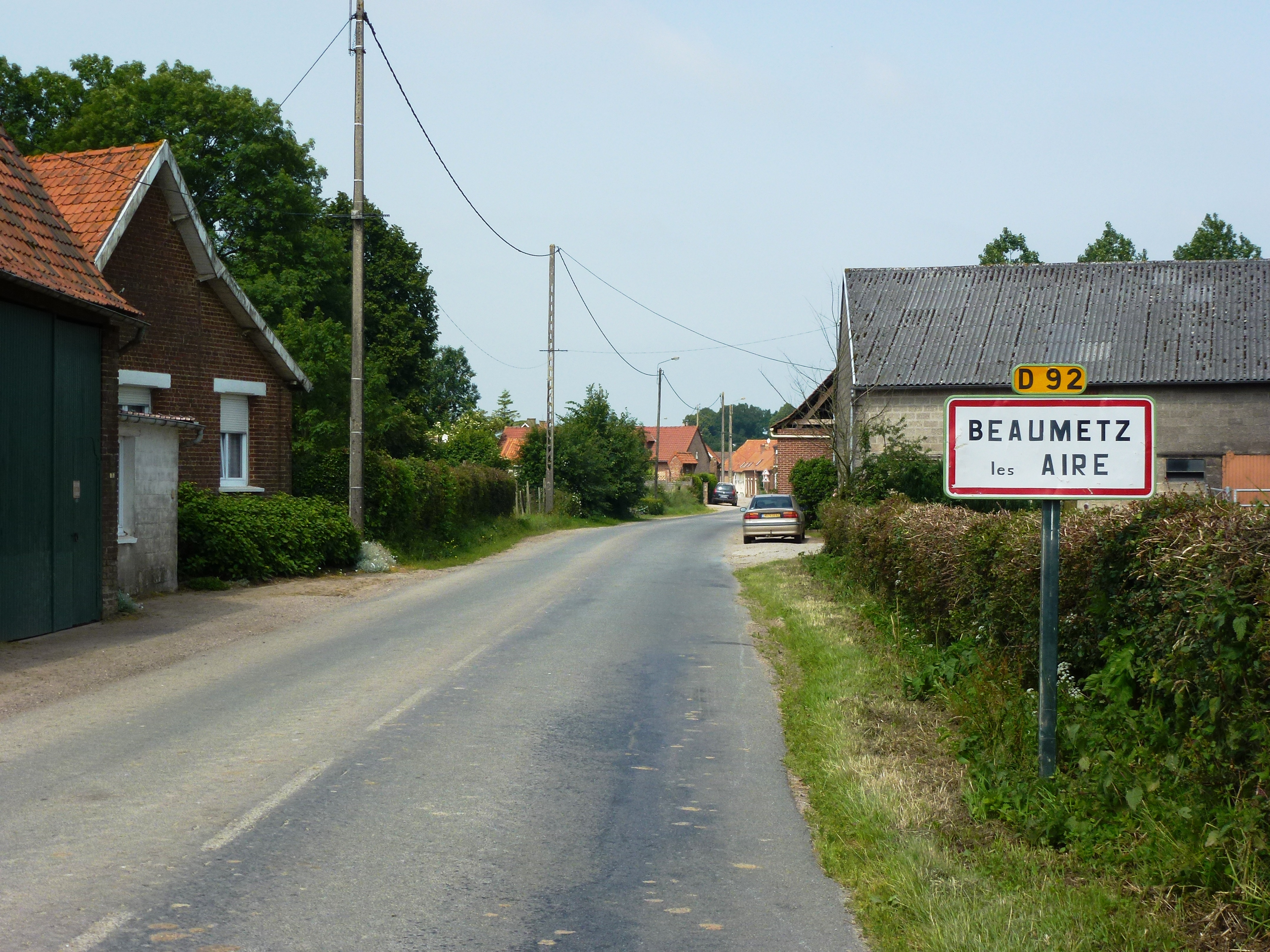
- The road into Beaumetz-lès-Aire

- Coat of arms
- Location of Beaumetz-lès-Aire
- Location within France Location within Hauts-de-France
- Coordinates: 50°32′32″N 2°13′41″E
- Country: France
- Region: Hauts-de-France
- Department: Pas-de-Calais
- Arrondissement: Saint-Omer
- Canton: Fruges
- Intercommunality: CA Pays de Saint-Omer

Government
  - Mayor (2020–2026): Auxence Wigneron
- Area^{1}: 4.43 km^{2} (1.71 sq mi)
- Elevation: 180 m (590 ft)
- Highest elevation: 188 m (617 ft)
- Lowest elevation: 145 m (476 ft)
- Population (2023): 222
  - Density: 50.1/km^{2} (130/sq mi)
- Time zone: UTC+01:00 (CET)
  - Summer (DST): UTC+02:00 (CEST)
- INSEE/Postal code: 62095 /62960
- ^{1} French Land Register data, which excludes lakes, ponds, glaciers > 1 km^{2} (0.386 sq mi or 247 acres) and river estuaries.

Beaumetz-lès-Aire (Picard:Biaumis-lès-Aire) is a commune in the Pas-de-Calais department in the Hauts-de-France region in northern France.

== Geography ==
A village located 12 miles (18 km) south of Saint-Omer, at the junction of the D92, D130 and D159 roads.

== Population ==
Historical population
Year	Pop.	±% p.a.
1968	309	—
1975	286	−1.10%
1982	281	−0.25%
1990	229	−2.53%
1999	240	+0.52%
2007	220	−1.08%
2012	236	+1.41%
2017	239	+0.25%
2023	222	−1.22%
Source: INSEE

== Sights ==
- The nineteenth century church of St. John.

== See also ==
- Communes of the Pas-de-Calais department
