= Canton of Campagne-lès-Hesdin =

Coordinates: 50.39833°N 1.87750°E

Campagne-lès-Hesdin
- Former canton
- Interactive map of Campagne-lès-Hesdin
- Country: France
- Region: Hauts-de-France
- Department: Pas-de-Calais
- No. of communes: {{{nbcomm}}}
- Disbanded: 2015
- Area: 191.55 km^{2} (73.96 sq mi)
- Population (2012): 11,007
  - Density: 57.463/km^{2} (148.83/sq mi)

The canton of Campagne-lès-Hesdin is a former canton situated in the Pas-de-Calais département and in the Nord-Pas-de-Calais region of France. It was disbanded following the French canton reorganisation which came into effect in March 2015. It consisted of 23 communes, which joined the canton of Auxi-le-Château in 2015. It had a total of 11,007 inhabitants (2012).

== Geography ==
An area of small valleys and plateaux, consisting mostly of farmland, with the town of Campagne-lès-Hesdin in the arrondissement of Montreuil at its centre. The altitude varies from 2m (Roussent) to 132m (Boubers-lès-Hesmond).with an average altitude of 44m.

The canton comprised 23 communes:

- Aix-en-Issart
- Beaurainville
- Boisjean
- Boubers-lès-Hesmond
- Brimeux
- Buire-le-Sec
- Campagne-lès-Hesdin
- Douriez
- Gouy-Saint-André
- Hesmond
- Lespinoy
- Loison-sur-Créquoise
- Maintenay
- Marant
- Marenla
- Maresquel-Ecquemicourt
- Marles-sur-Canche
- Offin
- Roussent
- Saint-Denœux
- Saint-Rémy-au-Bois
- Saulchoy
- Sempy

== Population ==
Population Movement
1962	1968	1975	1982	1990	1999
8894	9606	9782	9913	10262	10229
Census count starting from 1962 : Population without double counting

== See also ==
- Pas-de-Calais
- Cantons of Pas-de-Calais
- Communes of Pas-de-Calais
