= Torcy, Pas-de-Calais =

Torcy
- Commune
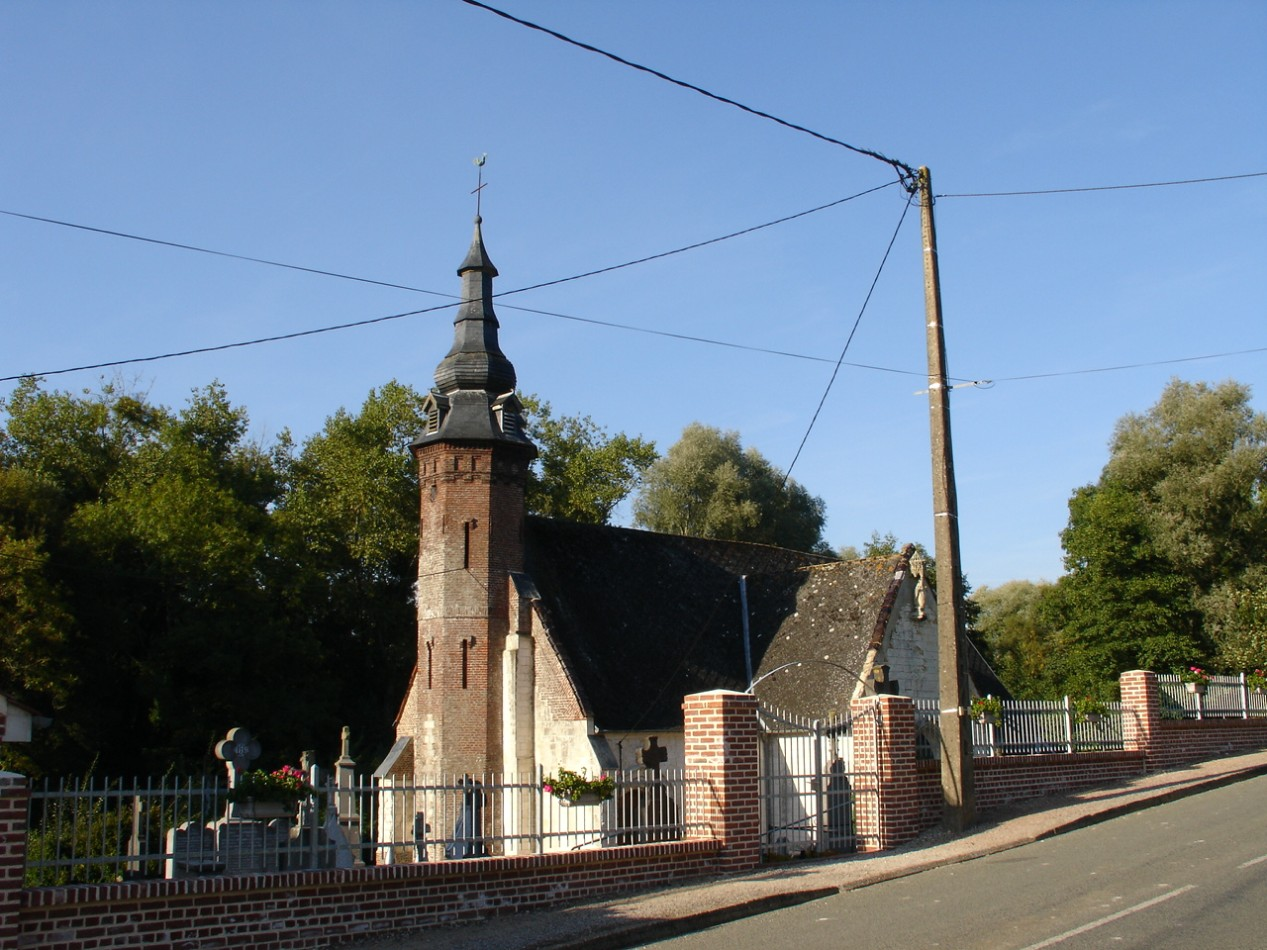
- The church of Torcy

- Coat of arms
- Location of Torcy
- Location within France Location within Hauts-de-France
- Coordinates: 50°29′04″N 2°01′24″E
- Country: France
- Region: Hauts-de-France
- Department: Pas-de-Calais
- Arrondissement: Montreuil
- Canton: Fruges
- Intercommunality: CC Haut Pays du Montreuillois

Government
  - Mayor (2020–2026): Patrick Cornu
- Area^{1}: 5.27 km^{2} (2.03 sq mi)
- Elevation: 80 m (260 ft)
- Highest elevation: 171 m (561 ft)
- Lowest elevation: 70 m (230 ft)
- Population (2023): 171
  - Density: 32.4/km^{2} (84.0/sq mi)
- Time zone: UTC+01:00 (CET)
  - Summer (DST): UTC+02:00 (CEST)
- INSEE/Postal code: 62823 /62310
- ^{1} French Land Register data, which excludes lakes, ponds, glaciers > 1 km^{2} (0.386 sq mi or 247 acres) and river estuaries.

Torcy (French pronunciation: [tɔʁsi]) is a commune in the Pas-de-Calais department of northern France.

== Geography ==
Torcy is located 11 miles (17 km) east of Montreuil on the D130 and in the valley of the river Créquoise. The nearest villages are Sains-lès-Fressin and Créquy.

== Population ==
Historical population
| Year | Pop. | ±% p.a. |
|---|---|---|
| 1968 | 166 | — |
| 1975 | 164 | −0.17% |
| 1982 | 144 | −1.84% |
| 1990 | 166 | +1.79% |
| 1999 | 142 | −1.72% |
| 2007 | 164 | +1.82% |
| 2012 | 160 | −0.49% |
| 2017 | 165 | +0.62% |
| 2023 | 171 | +0.60% |
Source: INSEE

== Places of interest ==
- The church of St. Eloi, dating from the sixteenth century
- Baladin, a restaurant, bar and guesthouse

== See also ==
- Communes of the Pas-de-Calais department
