= Jean de Créquy =

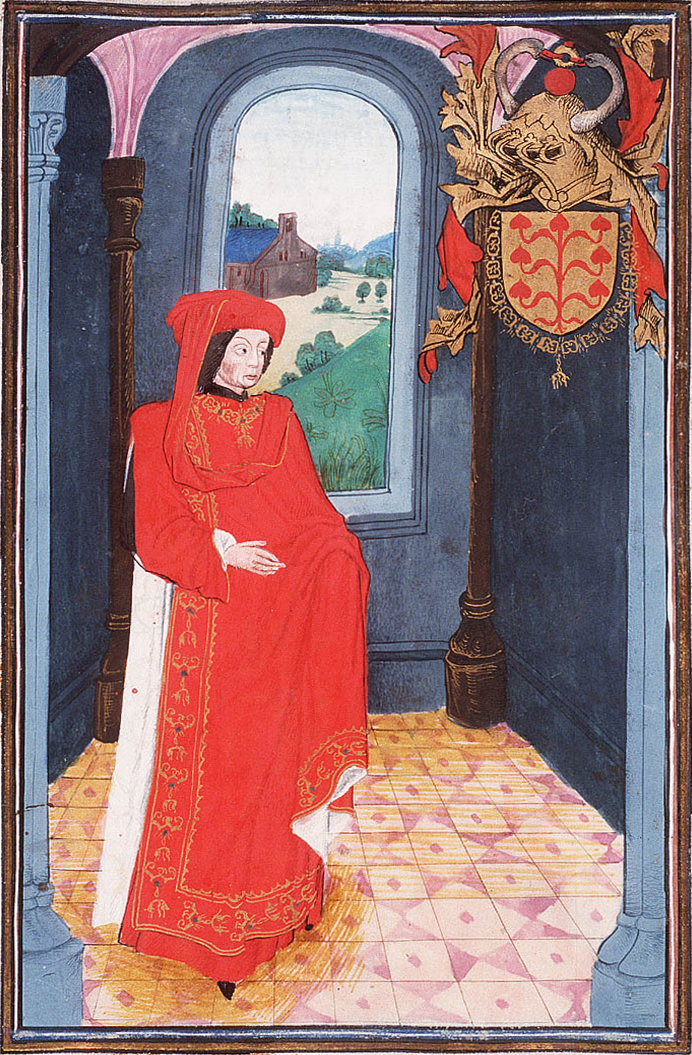
Jean V de Créquy

Jean de Créquy was born in 1395 into the military Créquy family, dating back to the 10th century, the son of Jean IV (1366–1411) and Jeanne de Roye (1375–1434).

He became seigneur (lord of the manor) of Créquy, Canaples and Fressin on the death of his father and was one of the first 'Knights of the Golden Fleece', an order started by Philip the Good, Duke of Burgundy. Jean V was admitted to the Order in 1430. He saw action throughout the Hundred Years War, on either side of the conflict. Jean V was in the service of Philip, Duke of Burgundy (whose allegiances changed twice) and took part in the defence of Paris against Joan of Arc in 1429 and became French ambassador to Aragon.

In 1446, he married Louise de La Tour d'Auvergne (died 1469), the daughter of Bertrand V of La Tour and Jacquette du Peschin. They had two children: Jacqueline (1457–1509) and Jean (1458–1480).

Personal coat of arms after 1430.

Jean de Crequy died in 1474.

== See also ==
- Créquy family
- List of knights of the Golden Fleece
