= Sains-lès-Fressin =

- Commune
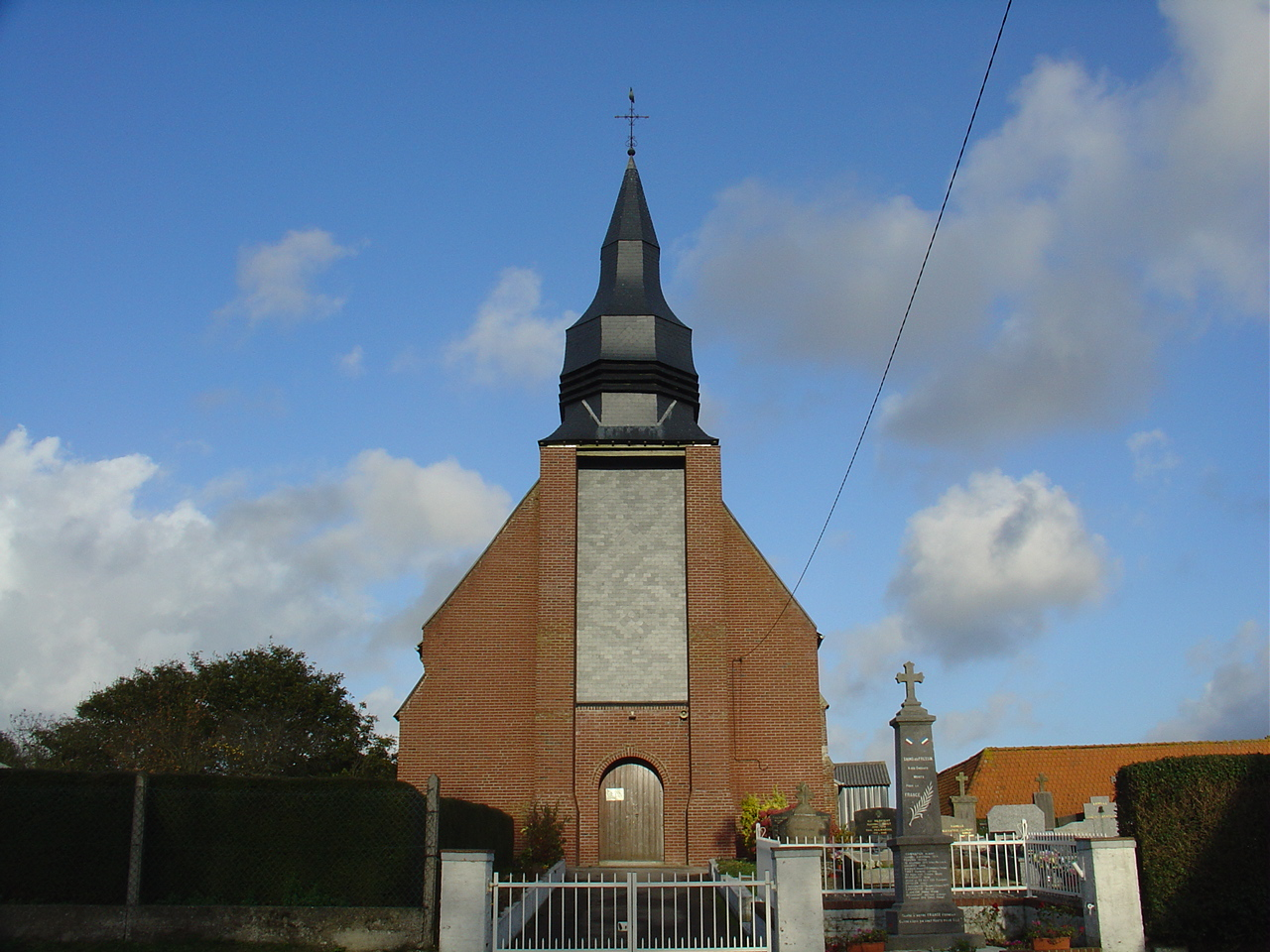
- The church of Sains-lès-Fressin

- Coat of arms
- Location of Sains-lès-Fressin
- Location within France Location within Hauts-de-France
- Coordinates: 50°28′04″N 2°02′32″E
- Country: France
- Region: Hauts-de-France
- Department: Pas-de-Calais
- Arrondissement: Montreuil
- Canton: Fruges
- Intercommunality: CC Haut Pays du Montreuillois

Government
  - Mayor (2020–2026): Jean Paul Boquet
- Area^{1}: 6.71 km^{2} (2.59 sq mi)
- Elevation: 137 m (449 ft)
- Highest elevation: 154 m (505 ft)
- Lowest elevation: 93 m (305 ft)
- Population (2023): 150
  - Density: 22/km^{2} (58/sq mi)
- Time zone: UTC+01:00 (CET)
  - Summer (DST): UTC+02:00 (CEST)
- INSEE/Postal code: 62738 /62310
- ^{1} French Land Register data, which excludes lakes, ponds, glaciers > 1 km^{2} (0.386 sq mi or 247 acres) and river estuaries.

Sains-lès-Fressin (French pronunciation: [sɛ̃ lɛ fʁɛsɛ̃], literally Sains near Fressin) is a commune in the Pas-de-Calais department of northern France.

== Geography ==
Sains-lès-Fressin lies 17 miles (27 km) east of Montreuil-sur-Mer, situated on the high ground between the villages of Fressin and Créquy on the D155 road.

== Population ==
Historical population
Year	Pop.	±% p.a.
1968	145	—
1975	148	+0.29%
1982	145	−0.29%
1990	146	+0.09%
1999	173	+1.90%
2007	184	+0.77%
2012	170	−1.57%
2017	162	−0.96%
2023	150	−1.27%
Source: INSEE

== Places of interest ==
- The church of St.Jacques, dating from the sixteenth century

== See also ==
- Communes of the Pas-de-Calais department
