= Cavron-Saint-Martin =

- Commune
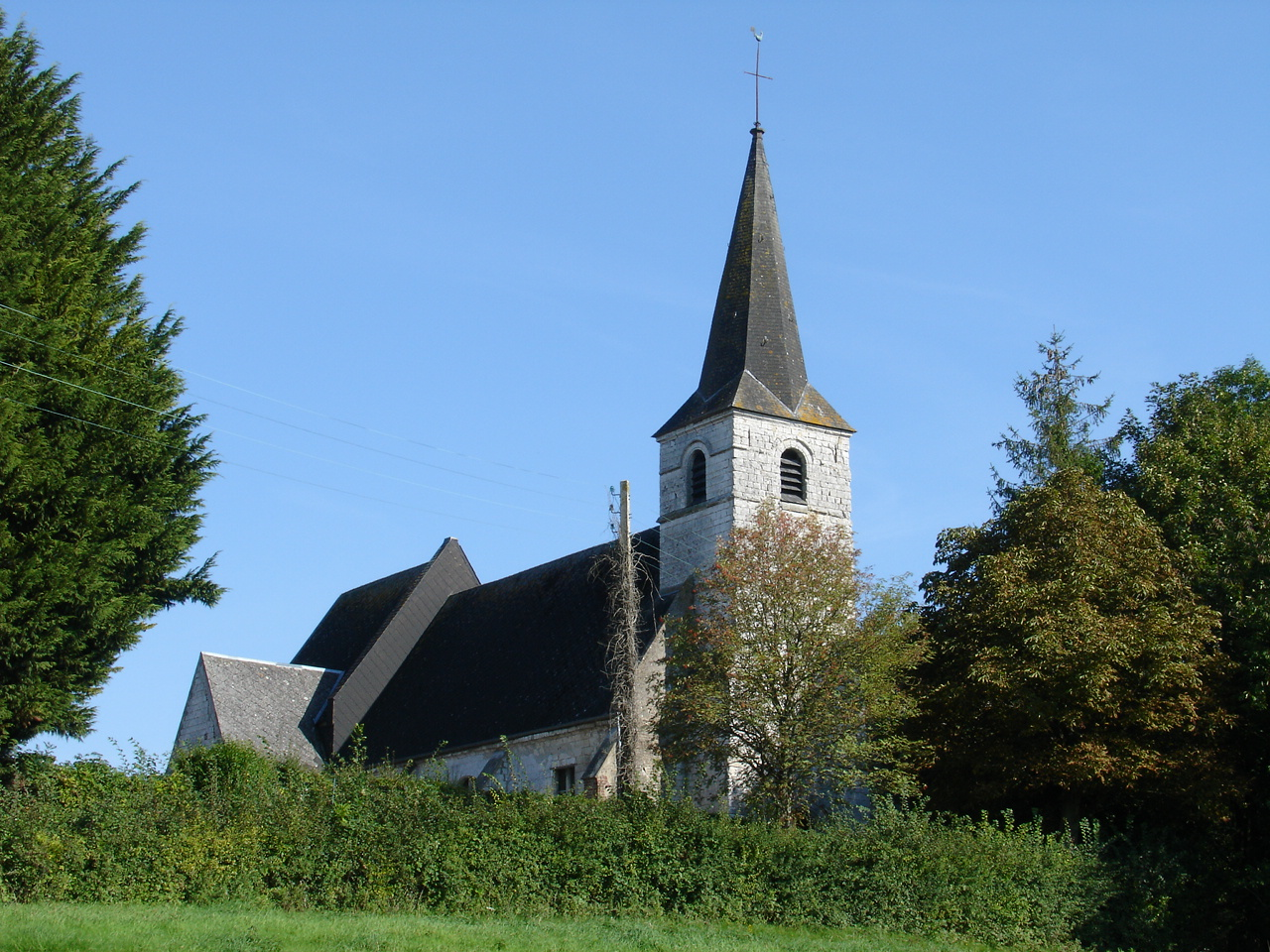
- The church of Cavron-Saint-Martin

- Coat of arms
- Location of Cavron-Saint-Martin
- Location within France Location within Hauts-de-France
- Coordinates: 50°25′02″N 1°59′53″E
- Country: France
- Region: Hauts-de-France
- Department: Pas-de-Calais
- Arrondissement: Montreuil
- Canton: Auxi-le-Château
- Intercommunality: CC des 7 Vallées

Government
  - Mayor (2020–2026): Antoine Bollard
- Area^{1}: 11.86 km^{2} (4.58 sq mi)
- Elevation: 30 m (98 ft)
- Highest elevation: 114 m (374 ft)
- Lowest elevation: 21 m (69 ft)
- Population (2023): 423
  - Density: 35.7/km^{2} (92.4/sq mi)
- Time zone: UTC+01:00 (CET)
  - Summer (DST): UTC+02:00 (CEST)
- INSEE/Postal code: 62220 /62140
- ^{1} French Land Register data, which excludes lakes, ponds, glaciers > 1 km^{2} (0.386 sq mi or 247 acres) and river estuaries.

Cavron-Saint-Martin (French pronunciation: [kavʁɔ̃ sɛ̃ maʁtɛ̃]) is a commune in the Pas-de-Calais département in the Hauts-de-France region of France in the valley of the Planquette, a small tributary of the Canche river.

== Population ==
Historical population
Year	Pop.	±% p.a.
1968	406	—
1975	409	+0.11%
1982	429	+0.68%
1990	382	−1.44%
1999	402	+0.57%
2007	462	+1.75%
2012	492	+1.27%
2017	457	−1.47%
2023	423	−1.28%
Source: INSEE

== See also ==
- Communes of the Pas-de-Calais department
