= Wambercourt =

- Commune
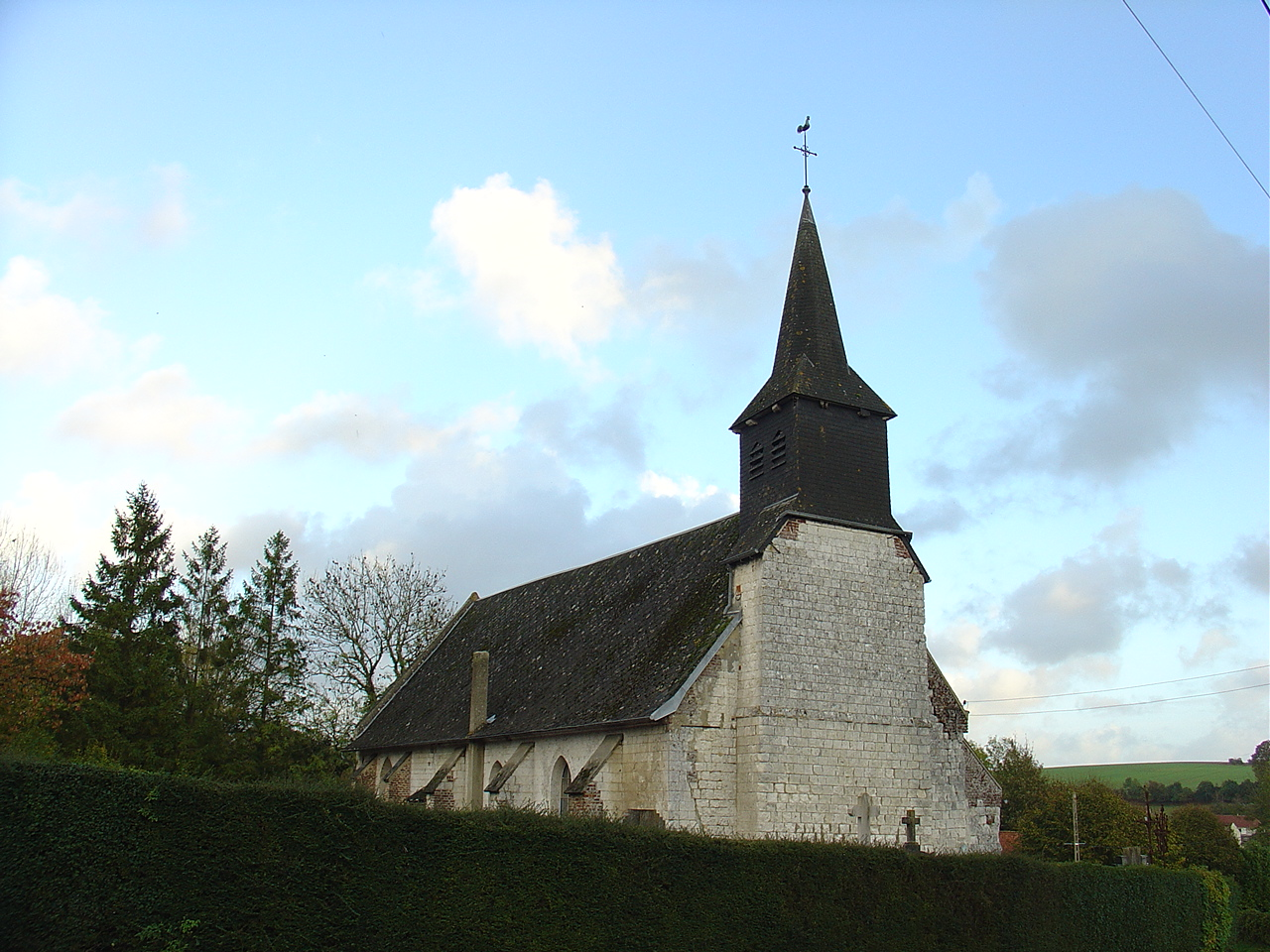
- The church of Wambercourt
- Location of Wambercourt
- Location within France Location within Hauts-de-France
- Coordinates: 50°25′46″N 2°01′26″E
- Country: France
- Region: Hauts-de-France
- Department: Pas-de-Calais
- Arrondissement: Montreuil
- Canton: Auxi-le-Château
- Intercommunality: CC des 7 Vallées

Government
  - Mayor (2020–2026): Bernard Taffin
- Area^{1}: 6.06 km^{2} (2.34 sq mi)
- Elevation: 39 m (128 ft)
- Highest elevation: 118 m (387 ft)
- Lowest elevation: 35 m (115 ft)
- Population (2023): 259
  - Density: 42.7/km^{2} (111/sq mi)
- Time zone: UTC+01:00 (CET)
  - Summer (DST): UTC+02:00 (CEST)
- INSEE/Postal code: 62871 /62140
- ^{1} French Land Register data, which excludes lakes, ponds, glaciers > 1 km^{2} (0.386 sq mi or 247 acres) and river estuaries.

Wambercourt is a commune in the Pas-de-Calais department in the Nord-Pas de Calais region of France.

== Geography ==
Wambercourt lies along the valley of the Planquette (a tributary of the Canche), in upper Artois.

== Population ==
Historical population
Year	Pop.	±% p.a.
1968	173	—
1975	154	−1.65%
1982	172	+1.59%
1990	181	+0.64%
1999	198	+1.00%
2007	216	+1.09%
2012	260	+3.78%
2017	245	−1.18%
2023	259	+0.93%
Source: INSEE

== See also ==
- Communes of the Pas-de-Calais department
