= Créquy family =

Créquy
- Description - d'or au créquier de gueules A red wild-cherry tree on a gold field.
- Origin: France

Créquy (often spelled Créqui) is a French noble family which originated in Artois.

== Origins ==
The family took its name from the small lordship of Créquy, in present-day Pas-de-Calais. According to some authors, its genealogy goes back to the 9th century, but true lineage is only evident from the end of the 12th century with their alliances with the Saint-Omer and Aire noble houses. The Crequy family originated the noble houses of Blanchefort, Bonne, Ricey, Blécourt, Canaples, Bernieulles, Hesmond, Tilly, Heilly, and Royon and some bastard branches, such as Lorins, Winnezeele and Oudekerque. The Crequy lineage seems to have engendered several small branches in villages of the Haut-Pays area such as Ambricourt, Coupelle-Vieille, Fruges, Reclinghem, Wandonne, Rimboval, Dennebroeucq, Douriez, Capelle-lès-Hesdin, Guigny, La Loge, Montreuil, Sempy and Verchocq.

== Notable members ==
Raoul de Créquy took the cross and was taken prisoner at the Battle of Mount Cadmus. His wife, Mahaut, believing her husband was dead, was going to marry the Sire of Renty, whom Raoul found in his domains on his return to France. His wife recognized him thanks to the bridal half-wedding ring that he wore, giving rise to the famous romantic poem of the Sire of Créquy, in one hundred and seven quatrains. He died in 1181.

Henri de Créquy was killed at the siege of Damietta in 1240; Jacques de Créquy, Marshal of Guienne, was killed at Agincourt with his brothers Jean and Raoul; Jean de Créquy, lord of Canaples, was in the Burgundian service, and took part in the defence of Paris against Joan of Arc in 1429, received the Order of the Golden Fleece in 1431, and was ambassador to Aragon and France; Antoine de Créquy was one of the boldest captains of Francis I, who defended Thérouanne in 1513 and died in consequence of an accident at the siege of Hesdin in 1523. Jean VIII, Sire de Créquy, Prince de Poix, seigneur de Canaples (died 1555), left three sons, the eldest of whom, Antoine de Créquy (1535–1574), inherited the family estates on the death of his brothers at Saint-Quentin in 1557. He was raised to the cardinalate, and his nephew and heir, Antoine de Blanchefort, assumed the name and coat-of-arms of Créquy.

Charles I de Blanchefort (1578–1638), Prince de Poix, Seigneur de Créquy, de Fressin et de Canaples, Marquis de Vizille et de Treffort, Comte de Sault, Baron de Vienne-le-Chastel et de La Tour d'Aigues, Duc de Lesdiguieres, Marshal of France and peer of France, son of Antoine de Blanchefort, saw his first fighting at Laon in 1594 and was wounded at the capture of Saint-Jean-d'Angély in 1621. In the following year, he became a marshal of France. He served through the Piedmontese campaign in aid of Victor Amadeus, Duke of Savoy in 1624, as second in command to the Constable of France, François de Bonne, Duc de Lesdiguières, whose daughter, Madeleine, he had married in 1595. In 1626, he inherited the estates and title of his father-in-law, who had induced him, after the death of his first wife, to marry her half-sister Françoise. He was also Lieutenant-General of Dauphiné. In 1633 he was ambassador to Rome, and in 1636 to Venice. He fought in the Italian campaigns of 1630, 1635, 1636, and 1637, when he helped to defeat the Spaniards at Monte Baldo. He was killed on 17 March 1638 in an attempt to raise the siege of Crema, a fortress in the Milanese. He had a quarrel extending over years with Philip, the bastard of Savoy, which ended in a duel fatal to Philip in 1599; and in 1620 he defended Honorat de Beauvilliers, Comte de Saint-Aignan, who was his prisoner of war, against a threatened prosecution by Louis XIII. Some of his letters are preserved in the Bibliothque Nationale in Paris, and his biography was written by N. Chorier (Grenoble, 1683).

François de Bonne, Comte de Sault, Duc de Lesdiguières (1600–1677), Governor and Lieutenant-General of Dauphin, took the name and arms of Bonne, and was the eldest son of Charles I de Blanchefort.

Charles II de Créquy, seigneur de Canaple was the younger son of Charles I de Blanchefort. He was killed at the siege of Chambry in 1630, leaving three sons:

Charles III de Créquy (1623?–1687), sieur de Blanchefort, Prince de Poix, Duc de Créquy, was the eldest son of Charles II de Créquy. He served in the campaigns of 1642 and 1645 in the Thirty Years' War, and in Catalonia in 1649. In 1646, after the siege of Orbetello, he was made Lieutenant-General by Louis. By faithful service during the king's minority he had won the gratitude of Anne of Austria and of Mazarin, and in 1652 he became Duc de Créquy and a peer of France. The latter half of his life was spent at court, where he held the office of first gentleman of the royal chamber, which had been bought for him by his grandfather. In 1659 he was sent to Spain with gifts for the infanta Maria Theresa of Spain, and on a similar errand to Bavaria in 1680 before the marriage of the dauphin. He was ambassador to Rome from 1662 to 1665, and to England in 1677; and became governor of Paris in 1675. He died in Paris on 13 February 1687. His only daughter, Madeleine, married Charles de la Trémoille (1655–1709).

Alphonse de Créquy (died 1711), Comte de Canaples, was the second son of Charles II. He became, on the extinction of the elder branch of the family in 1702, Duc de Lesdiguires, and eventually succeeded to the honours of his younger brother François. Alphonse de Créquy had not the talent of his brothers, and lost his various appointments in France. He went to London in 1672, where he became closely allied with Charles de Saint-Évremond, and was one of the intimates of King Charles II of England.

François de Créquy (1625–1687), Chevalier de Créquy and Marquis de Marines, marshal of France, was the youngest of Charles II's sons. As a boy took part in the Thirty Years' War, distinguishing himself so greatly that at the age of twenty-six he was made a maréchal de camp, and a Lieutenant-General before he was thirty. He was regarded as the most brilliant of the younger officers, and won the favour of Louis XIV by his fidelity to the court during the second Fronde. In 1667 he served on the Rhine, and in 1668 he commanded the covering army during Louis XIV's siege of Lille, after the surrender of which the king rewarded him with the marshalate. In 1670 he overran the Duchy of Lorraine. Shortly after this Turenne, his old commander, was made Marshal-General, and all the Marshals were placed under his orders. Many resented this, and Créquy, in particular, whose career of uninterrupted success had made him overconfident, went into exile rather than serve under Turenne. After the death of Turenne and the retirement of Condé, he became the most important general officer in the army, but his overconfidence was punished by the severe defeat of Conzer Bruck (1675) and the surrender of Trier and his own captivity which followed. But in the later campaigns of the Franco-Dutch War he showed himself again a cool, daring and successful commander, and, carrying on the tradition of Turenne and Condé, he was, in his turn, the pattern of the younger Generals of the stamp of Luxembourg and Villars. He died in Paris on 3 February 1687.

Marshal Francois de Créquy had two sons, whose brilliant military abilities rivalled his own. The elder, François Joseph, Marquis de Créquy (1662–1702), already held the rank of Lieutenant-General when he was killed at Luzzara on 13 August 1702; and Nicolas Charles, sire de Créquy, was killed before Tournai in 1696 at the age of twenty-seven.

A younger branch of the Créquy family, that of Hesmont, was represented by Louis Marie, Marquis de Créquy (1705–1741), author of the Principes philosophiques des saints solitaires d'Egypte (1779), and husband of Renée Caroline de Roullay Créquy, Marquise de Créquy. The branch became extinct with the death in 1801 of his son, Charles Marie, who had some military reputation.
