= Contes, Pas-de-Calais =

Contes
- Commune
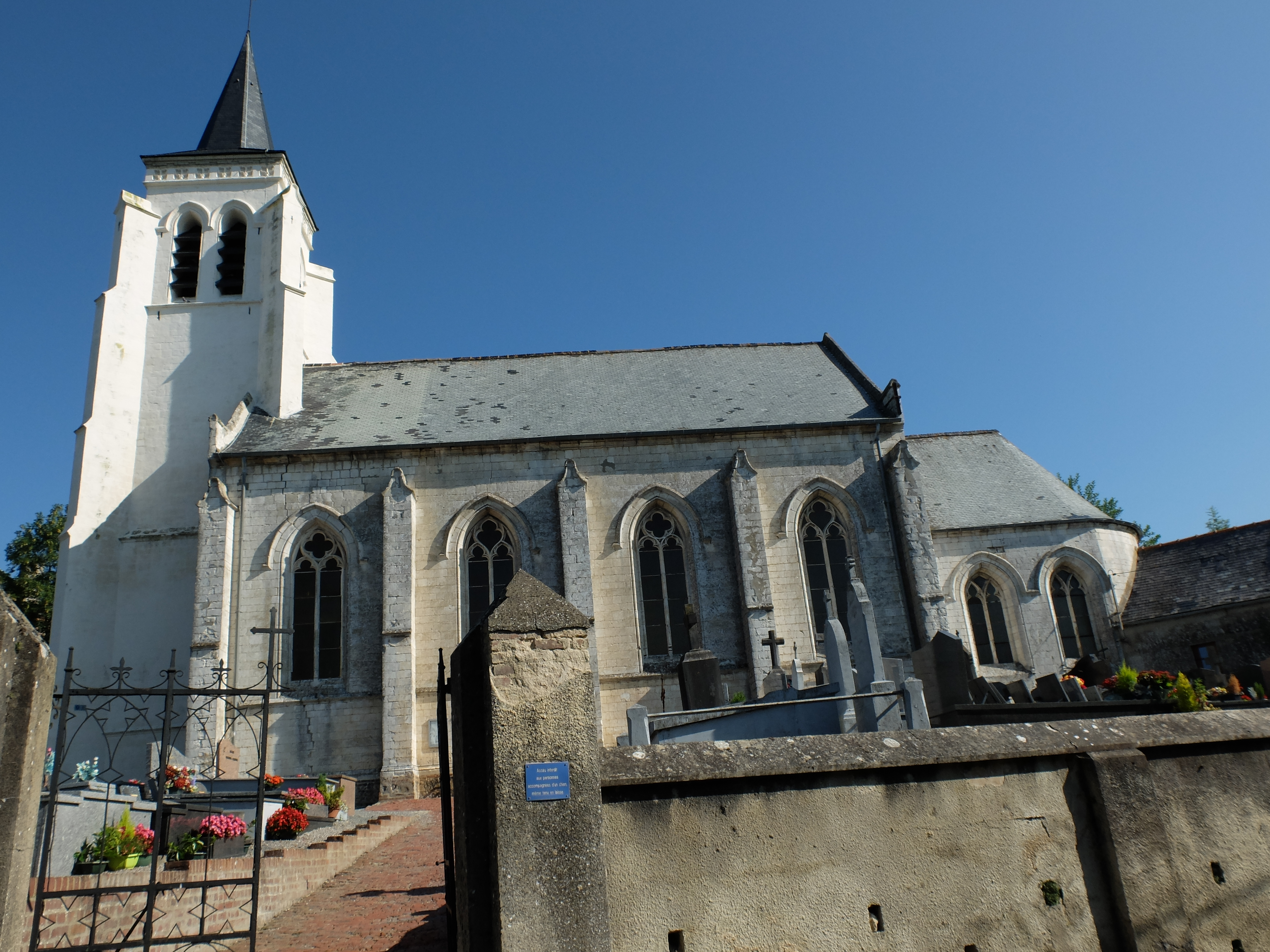
- The church of Contes

- Coat of arms
- Location of Contes
- Location within France Location within Hauts-de-France
- Coordinates: 50°24′33″N 1°57′40″E
- Country: France
- Region: Hauts-de-France
- Department: Pas-de-Calais
- Arrondissement: Montreuil
- Canton: Auxi-le-Château
- Intercommunality: CC des 7 Vallées

Government
  - Mayor (2020–2026): André Ponchel
- Area^{1}: 7.15 km^{2} (2.76 sq mi)
- Elevation: 23 m (75 ft)
- Highest elevation: 113 m (371 ft)
- Lowest elevation: 15 m (49 ft)
- Population (2023): 354
  - Density: 49.5/km^{2} (128/sq mi)
- Time zone: UTC+01:00 (CET)
  - Summer (DST): UTC+02:00 (CEST)
- INSEE/Postal code: 62236 /62990
- ^{1} French Land Register data, which excludes lakes, ponds, glaciers > 1 km^{2} (0.386 sq mi or 247 acres) and river estuaries.

Contes (French pronunciation: [kɔ̃t]) is a commune in the Pas-de-Calais department in the Hauts-de-France region of France.

== Geography ==
The rivers Canche and Planquette converge at Contes.

== Population ==
Historical population
| Year | Pop. | ±% p.a. |
|---|---|---|
| 1968 | 386 | — |
| 1975 | 333 | −2.09% |
| 1982 | 359 | +1.08% |
| 1990 | 370 | +0.38% |
| 1999 | 334 | −1.13% |
| 2007 | 313 | −0.81% |
| 2012 | 323 | +0.63% |
| 2017 | 331 | +0.49% |
| 2023 | 354 | +1.13% |
Source: INSEE

== See also ==
- Communes of the Pas-de-Calais department
