= Campagne-lès-Hesdin =

- Commune
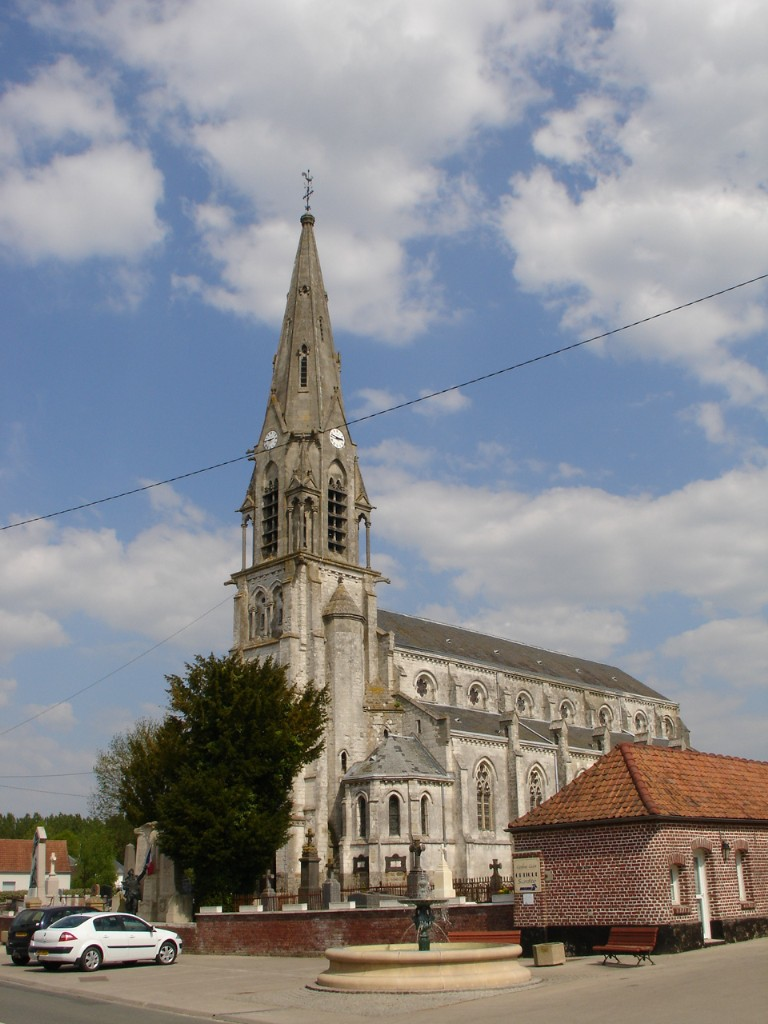
- The church of Campagne-lès-Hesdin

- Coat of arms
- Location of Campagne-lès-Hesdin
- Location within France Location within Hauts-de-France
- Coordinates: 50°23′54″N 1°52′39″E
- Country: France
- Region: Hauts-de-France
- Department: Pas-de-Calais
- Arrondissement: Montreuil
- Canton: Auxi-le-Château
- Intercommunality: CC des 7 Vallées

Government
  - Mayor (2020–2026): Michel Evrard
- Area^{1}: 15.64 km^{2} (6.04 sq mi)
- Elevation: 90 m (300 ft)
- Highest elevation: 94 m (308 ft)
- Lowest elevation: 29 m (95 ft)
- Population (2023): 1,943
  - Density: 124.2/km^{2} (321.8/sq mi)
- Time zone: UTC+01:00 (CET)
  - Summer (DST): UTC+02:00 (CEST)
- INSEE/Postal code: 62204 /62870
- ^{1} French Land Register data, which excludes lakes, ponds, glaciers > 1 km^{2} (0.386 sq mi or 247 acres) and river estuaries.

Campagne-lès-Hesdin (French pronunciation: [kɑ̃paɲ lɛz‿edɛ̃], literally Campagne near Hesdin) is a commune in the Pas-de-Calais department in northern France.

== History ==
In 1469 there were 64 households in Campagne.

There was an old church with a transept and quire dated to the early 17th century which was demolished in 1866. The current church dates to 1872.

== Geography ==
On the D138, between the towns of Hesdin and Montreuil and the valleys of the rivers Canche and Authie, the town is surrounded by sheep- and dairy-farming.

== International relations ==
Campagne-lès-Hesdin is twinned with:

- Adisham, United Kingdom

== Population ==
Historical population
Year	Pop.	±% p.a.
1968	1,334	—
1975	1,458	+1.28%
1982	1,474	+0.16%
1990	1,604	+1.06%
1999	1,696	+0.62%
2007	1,757	+0.44%
2012	1,754	−0.03%
2017	1,920	+1.82%
2023	1,943	+0.20%
Source: INSEE

== See also ==
- Communes of the Pas-de-Calais department
