= Lebiez =

Lebiez Sint-Vaast
- Commune
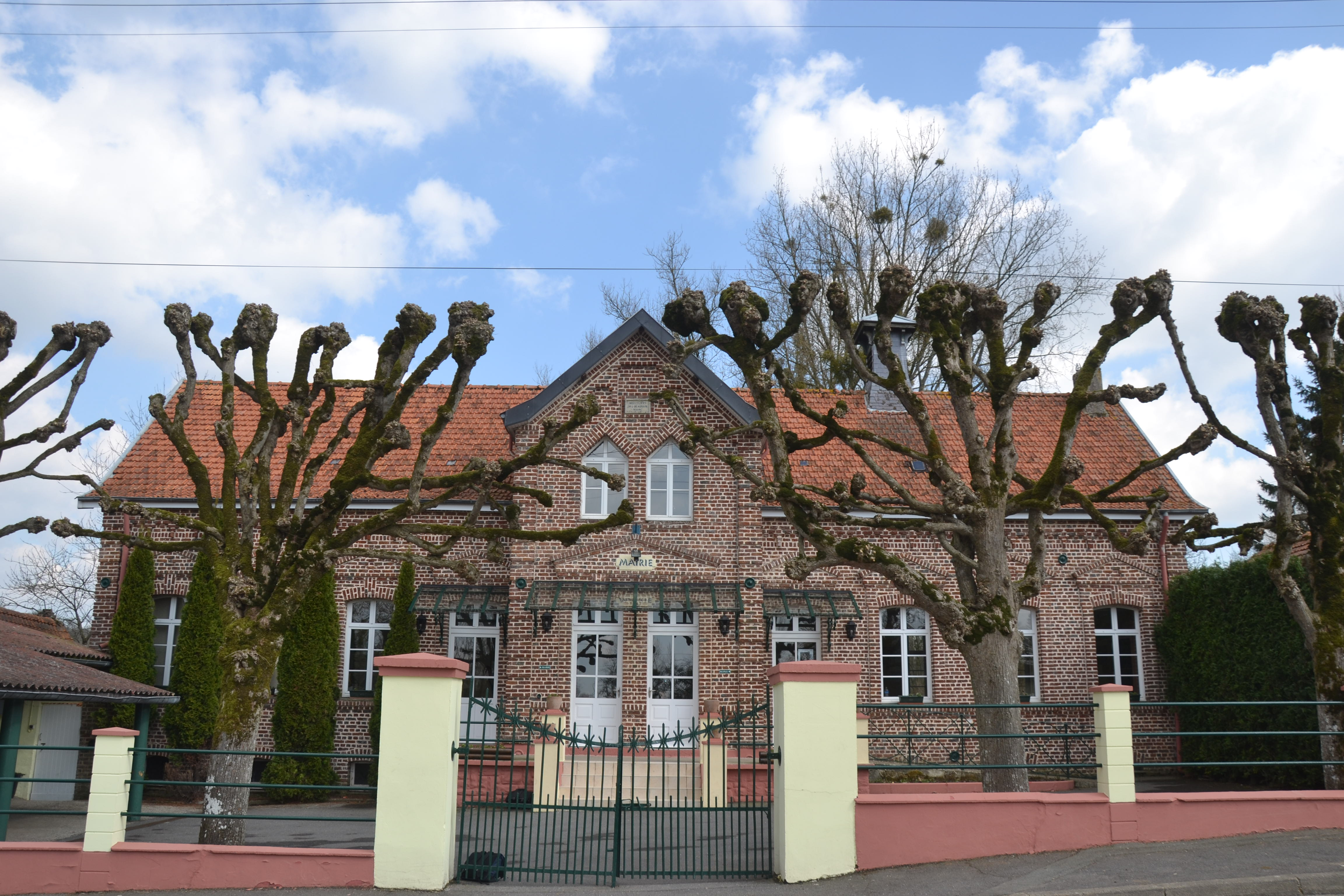
- The town hall and school of Lebiez

- Coat of arms
- Location of Lebiez
- Location within France Location within Hauts-de-France
- Coordinates: 50°28′10″N 1°58′55″E
- Country: France
- Region: Hauts-de-France
- Department: Pas-de-Calais
- Arrondissement: Montreuil
- Canton: Fruges
- Intercommunality: CC Haut Pays du Montreuillois

Government
  - Mayor (2020–2026): Pascal Legrand
- Area^{1}: 9.57 km^{2} (3.69 sq mi)
- Elevation: 57 m (187 ft)
- Highest elevation: 132 m (433 ft)
- Lowest elevation: 35 m (115 ft)
- Population (2023): 229
  - Density: 23.9/km^{2} (62.0/sq mi)
- Time zone: UTC+01:00 (CET)
  - Summer (DST): UTC+02:00 (CEST)
- INSEE/Postal code: 62492 /62990
- ^{1} French Land Register data, which excludes lakes, ponds, glaciers > 1 km^{2} (0.386 sq mi or 247 acres) and river estuaries.

Lebiez (French pronunciation: [ləbje]; West Flemish: Sint-Vaast) is a commune in the Pas-de-Calais department in the Hauts-de-France region of France.

== Geography ==
A small village situated 10 miles (16 km) east of Montreuil-sur-Mer at the D130 and D108 crossroads and by the banks of the river Créquoise.

== Population ==
Historical population
Year	Pop.	±% p.a.
1968	267	—
1975	240	−1.51%
1982	245	+0.29%
1990	243	−0.10%
1999	208	−1.71%
2007	240	+1.80%
2012	261	+1.69%
2017	250	−0.86%
2023	229	−1.45%
Source: INSEE

== Places of interest ==
- The sixteenth century church of St.Vaast
- A chapel dating from the seventeenth century.

== See also ==
- Communes of the Pas-de-Calais department
