= Ruisseauville =

- Commune
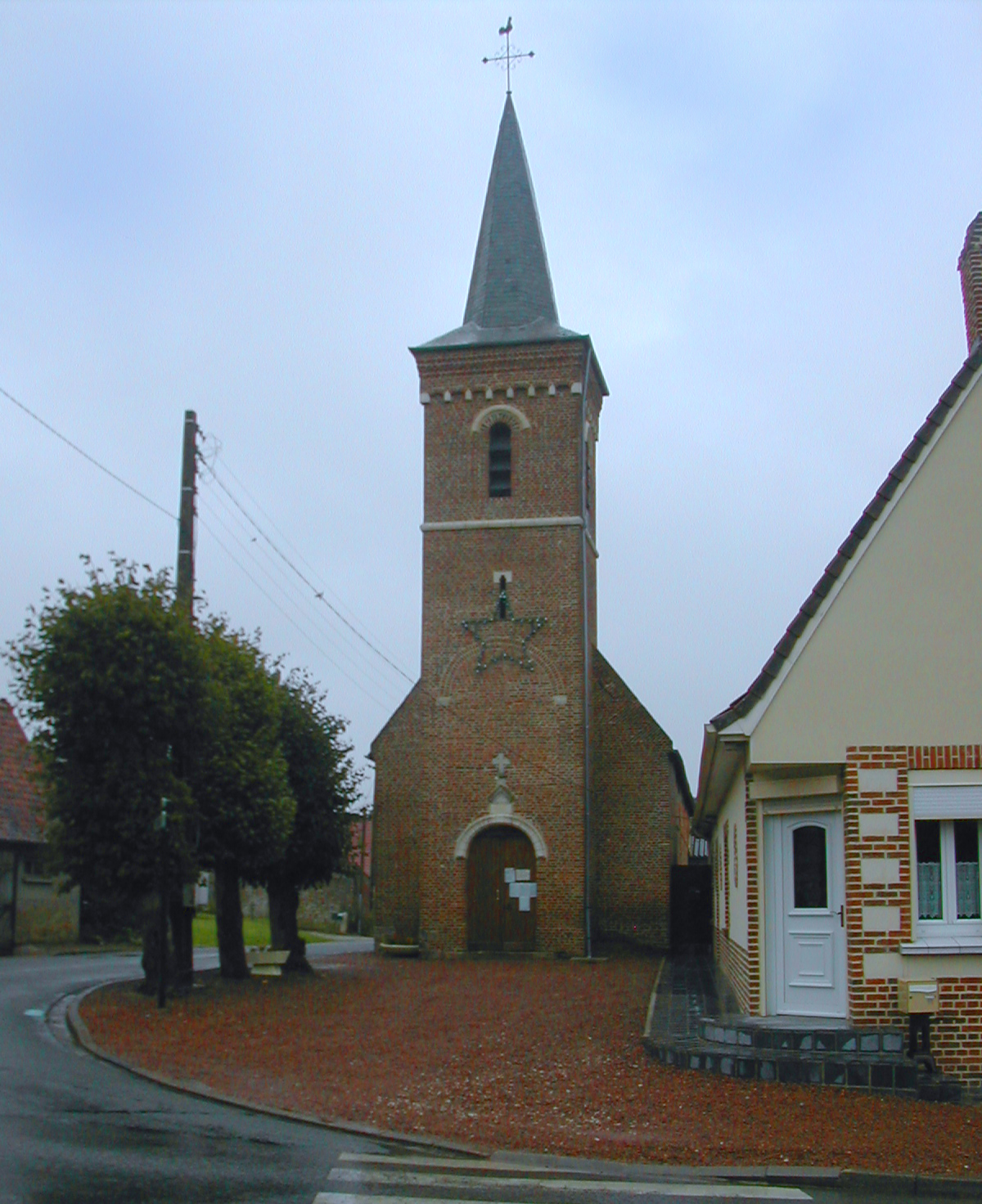
- The church of Ruisseauville

- Coat of arms
- Location of Ruisseauville
- Location within France Location within Hauts-de-France
- Coordinates: 50°28′51″N 2°07′30″E
- Country: France
- Region: Hauts-de-France
- Department: Pas-de-Calais
- Arrondissement: Montreuil
- Canton: Fruges
- Intercommunality: CC Haut Pays du Montreuillois

Government
  - Mayor (2020–2026): Serge Pouthe
- Area^{1}: 3.89 km^{2} (1.50 sq mi)
- Elevation: 139 m (456 ft)
- Highest elevation: 145 m (476 ft)
- Lowest elevation: 122 m (400 ft)
- Population (2023): 214
  - Density: 55.0/km^{2} (142/sq mi)
- Time zone: UTC+01:00 (CET)
  - Summer (DST): UTC+02:00 (CEST)
- INSEE/Postal code: 62726 /62310
- ^{1} French Land Register data, which excludes lakes, ponds, glaciers > 1 km^{2} (0.386 sq mi or 247 acres) and river estuaries.

Ruisseauville (French pronunciation: [ʁɥisovil]) is a commune in the Pas-de-Calais department in the Hauts-de-France region of France 15 miles (24 km) east of Montreuil-sur-Mer, south of Fruges.

== History ==
It was liberated from Nazi occupation in September 1944 by the Polish 1st Armoured Division.

== Population ==
Historical population
Year	Pop.	±% p.a.
1968	142	—
1975	147	+0.50%
1982	148	+0.10%
1990	147	−0.08%
1999	121	−2.14%
2007	146	+2.38%
2012	180	+4.28%
2017	199	+2.03%
2023	214	+1.22%
Source: INSEE

== See also ==
- Communes of the Pas-de-Calais department
