= Planquette =

- Location within France Location within Hauts-de-France

Location
- Country: France

Physical characteristics
- Source: Pas-de-Calais
- Mouth: Canche
  - coordinates: 50°24′17″N 1°57′19″E
- Length: 11.8 km (7.3 mi)

Basin features
- Progression: Canche→ English Channel

The river Planquette (French pronunciation: [plɑ̃kɛt]) is one of the small streams that flow from the plateau of the southern Boulonnais and Picardy, into the Canche. Its length is 11.8 kilometres (7.3 mi).

The river rises at Planques and passes Fressin, Wambercourt, Cavron-Saint-Martin and joins the Canche at Contes.

== See also ==
- Schéma directeur d'aménagement et de gestion des eaux
