= Planques =

Planques Planken
- Commune
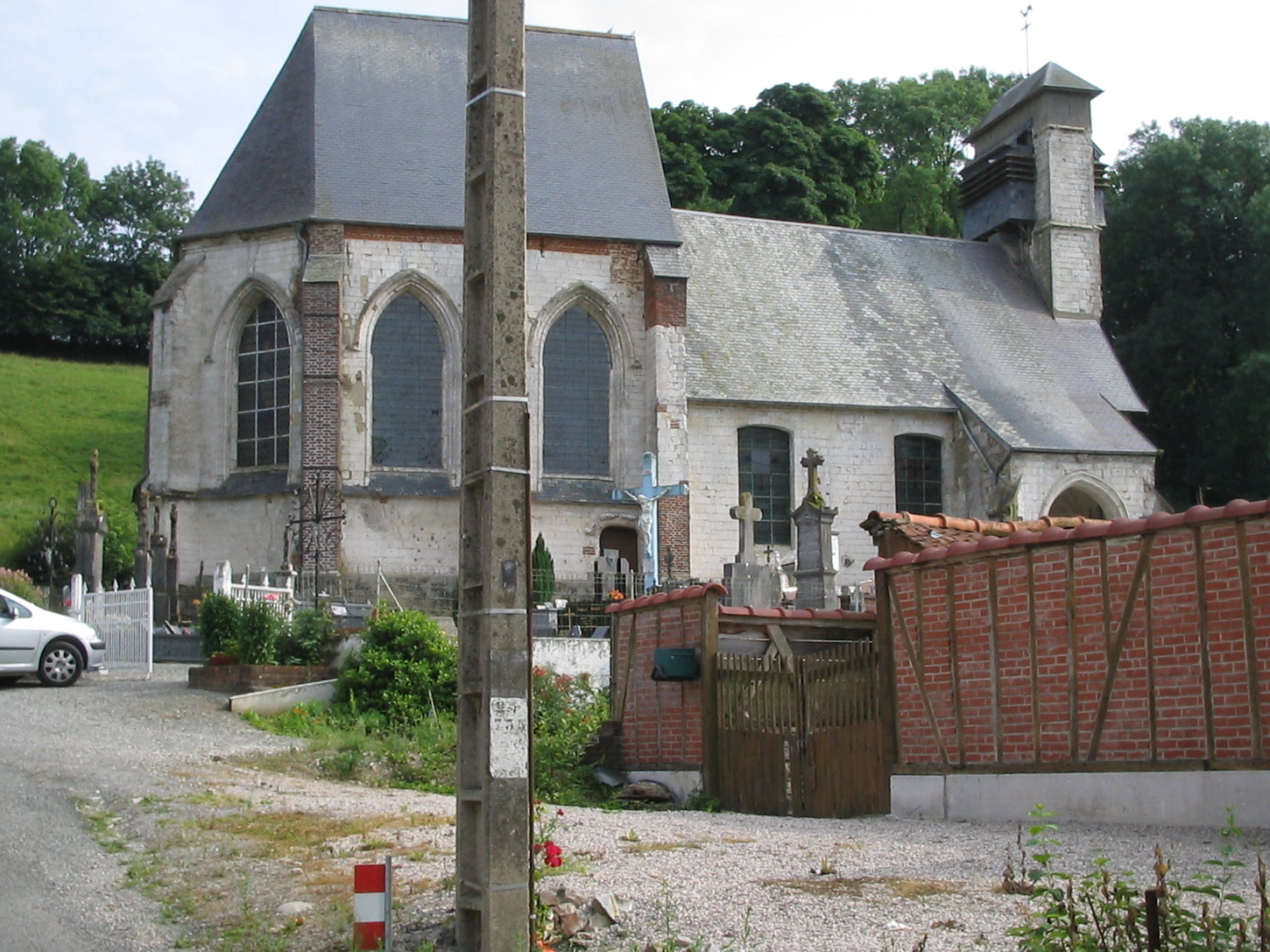
- The church of Planques

- Coat of arms
- Location of Planques
- Location within France Location within Hauts-de-France
- Coordinates: 50°27′47″N 2°04′57″E
- Country: France
- Region: Hauts-de-France
- Department: Pas-de-Calais
- Arrondissement: Montreuil
- Canton: Fruges
- Intercommunality: CC Haut Pays du Montreuillois

Government
  - Mayor (2020–2026): Paul-Marie Vienne
- Area^{1}: 6.18 km^{2} (2.39 sq mi)
- Elevation: 131 m (430 ft)
- Highest elevation: 144 m (472 ft)
- Lowest elevation: 72 m (236 ft)
- Population (2023): 104
  - Density: 16.8/km^{2} (43.6/sq mi)
- Time zone: UTC+01:00 (CET)
  - Summer (DST): UTC+02:00 (CEST)
- INSEE/Postal code: 62659 /62310
- ^{1} French Land Register data, which excludes lakes, ponds, glaciers > 1 km^{2} (0.386 sq mi or 247 acres) and river estuaries.

Planques (French pronunciation: [plɑ̃k]; West Flemish: Planken) is a commune in the Pas-de-Calais department in the Hauts-de-France region of France. The source of the small river Planquette is in the commune.

== Population ==
Historical population
Year	Pop.	±% p.a.
1968	131	—
1975	122	−1.01%
1982	110	−1.47%
1990	95	−1.82%
1999	99	+0.46%
2007	106	+0.86%
2012	105	−0.19%
2017	81	−5.06%
2023	104	+4.25%
Source: INSEE

== Places of interest ==
- The 16th-18th century church

== See also ==
- Communes of the Pas-de-Calais department
