= Créquoise =

Small stream in France

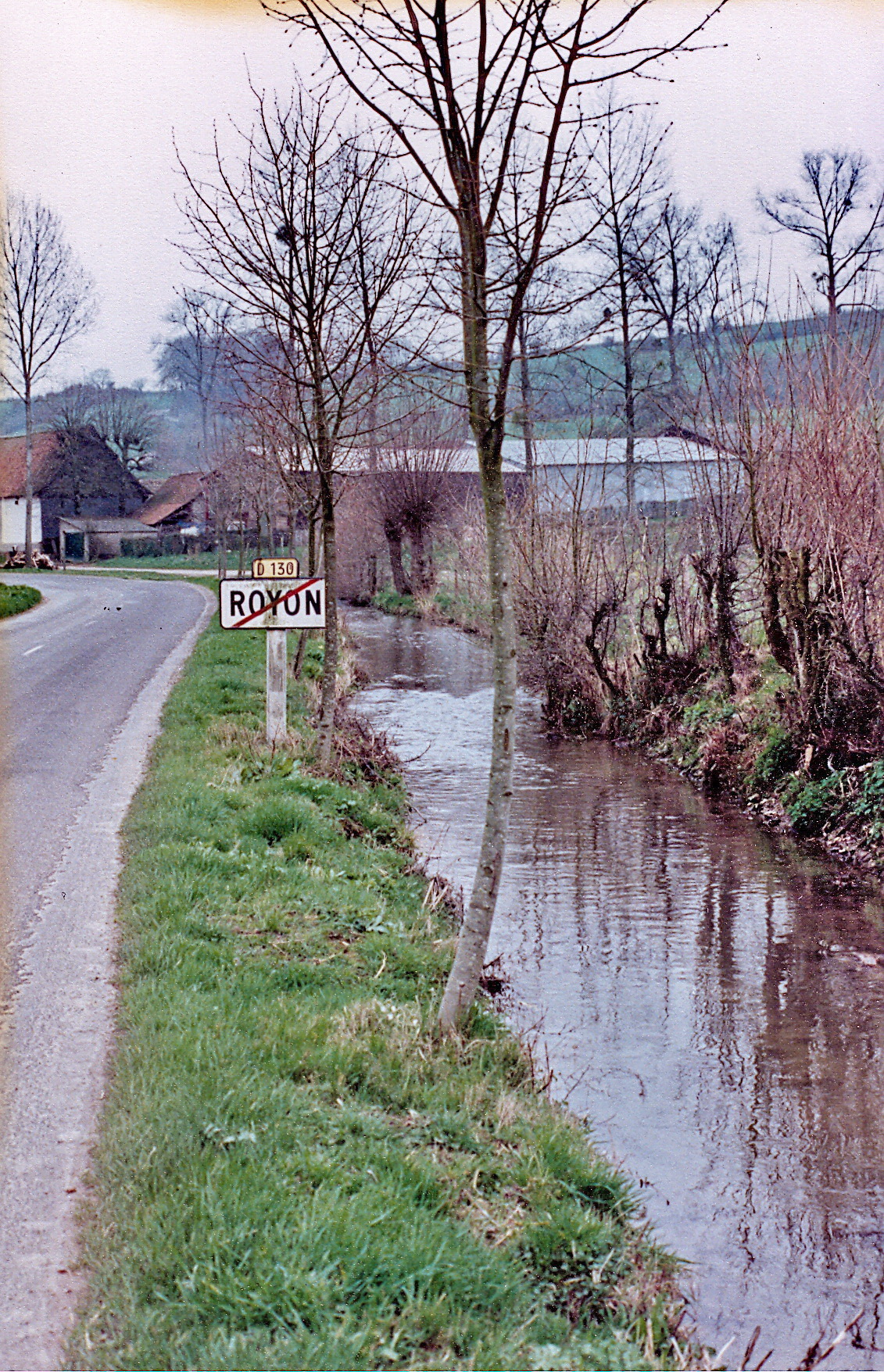
- The Créquoise in Royon

- Location within France Location within Hauts-de-France

Location
- Country: France

Physical characteristics
- Source
  - location: Pas-de-Calais
- Mouth
  - location: Canche
  - coordinates: 50°25′44″N 1°54′7″E
- Length: 15 km (9 mi)

Basin features
- Progression: Canche→ English Channel

The river Créquoise (French pronunciation: [kʁekwaz]; Picard: Créquoése) is one of the small streams that flow from the plateau of the southern Boulonnais and Picardy, into the Canche. It is 14.8 km (9.2 mi) long.

The river rises at Créquy and passes by Torcy, Royon, Lebiez, Hesmond, Offin, Loison-sur-Créquoise and joins the Canche at Beaurainville. Three small tributaries join the Créquoise, the Fosse du Corval, L'Embrienne and le Surgeon

== See also ==
- Schéma directeur d'aménagement et de gestion des eaux
