= Royon =

- Commune
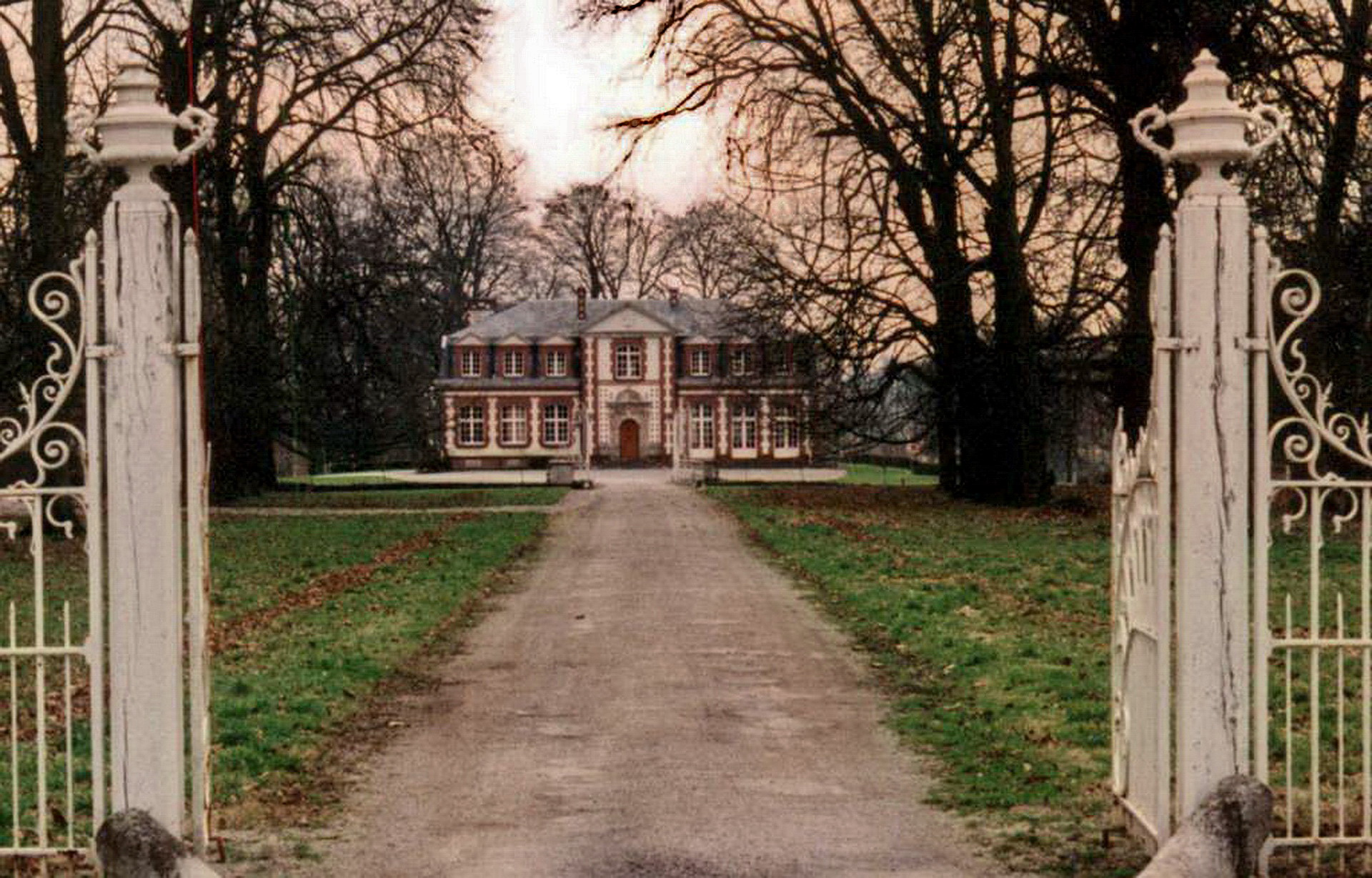
- Rebuilt château

- Coat of arms
- Location of Royon
- Location within France Location within Hauts-de-France
- Coordinates: 50°28′25″N 1°59′35″E
- Country: France
- Region: Hauts-de-France
- Department: Pas-de-Calais
- Arrondissement: Montreuil
- Canton: Fruges
- Intercommunality: CC Haut Pays du Montreuillois

Government
  - Mayor (2020–2026): Jean-Marie Cornuel
- Area^{1}: 7.49 km^{2} (2.89 sq mi)
- Elevation: 59 m (194 ft)
- Highest elevation: 160 m (520 ft)
- Lowest elevation: 54 m (177 ft)
- Population (2023): 121
  - Density: 16.2/km^{2} (41.8/sq mi)
- Time zone: UTC+01:00 (CET)
  - Summer (DST): UTC+02:00 (CEST)
- INSEE/Postal code: 62725 /62990
- ^{1} French Land Register data, which excludes lakes, ponds, glaciers > 1 km^{2} (0.386 sq mi or 247 acres) and river estuaries.

Royon (French pronunciation: [ʁwajɔ̃]) is a commune in the Pas-de-Calais department in the Hauts-de-France region of France 10 miles (16 km) east of Montreuil-sur-Mer in the valley of the Créquoise river.

== Population ==
Historical population
Year	Pop.	±% p.a.
1968	133	—
1975	135	+0.21%
1982	127	−0.87%
1990	117	−1.02%
1999	103	−1.41%
2007	117	+1.61%
2012	128	+1.81%
2017	135	+1.07%
2023	121	−1.81%
Source: INSEE

== History ==
The slopes of hills in the region were blocked by thorny hedges of créquiers, the wild plum, and these hedges were called royons, which may be the source of the name.

The first mention of Royon is in 893 in Gallia Christiana. It is mentioned again in 1641 as 'Roion', and became 'Royon' in 1804.

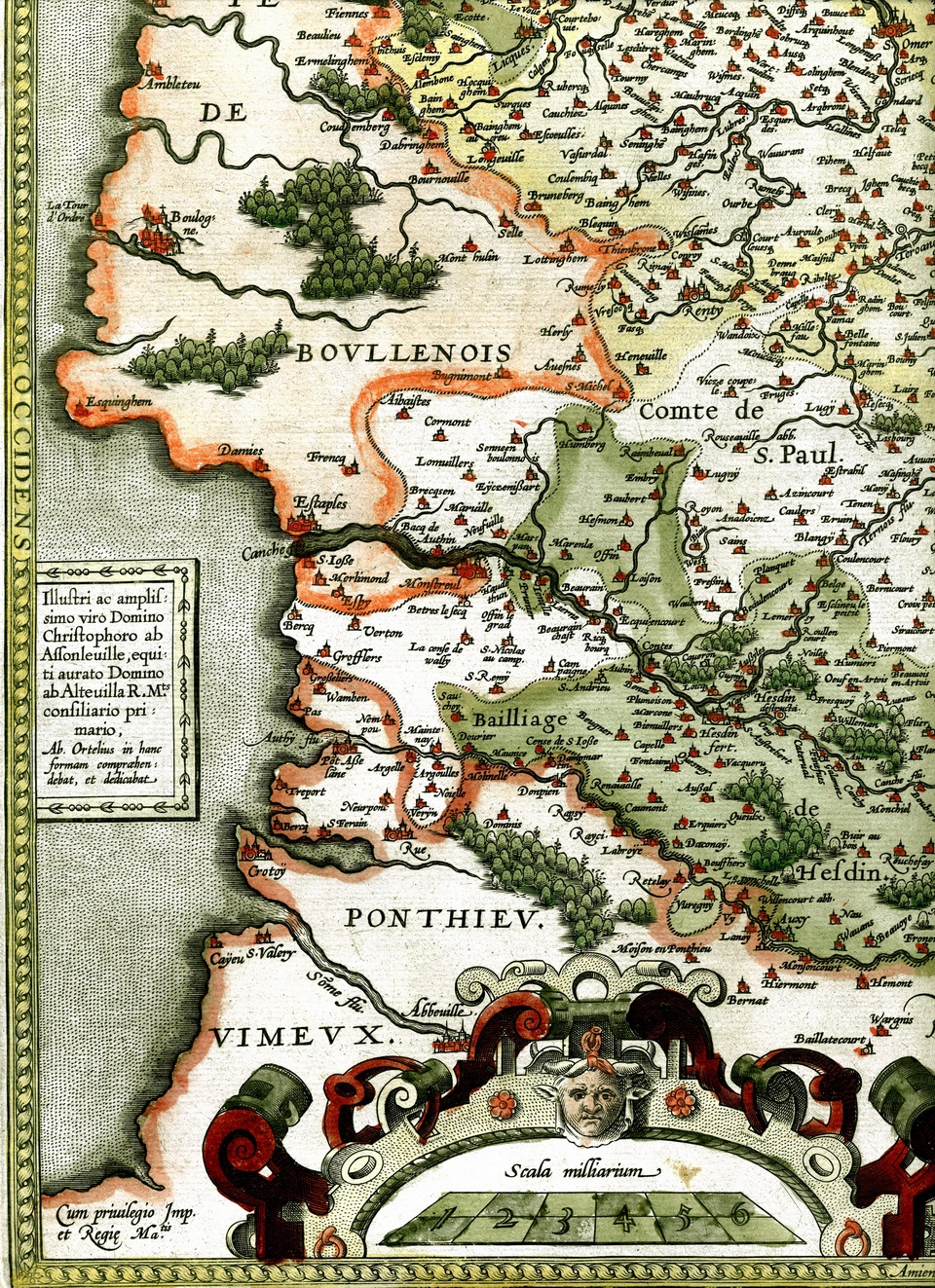
Map of Artois by Ortellius 1576.

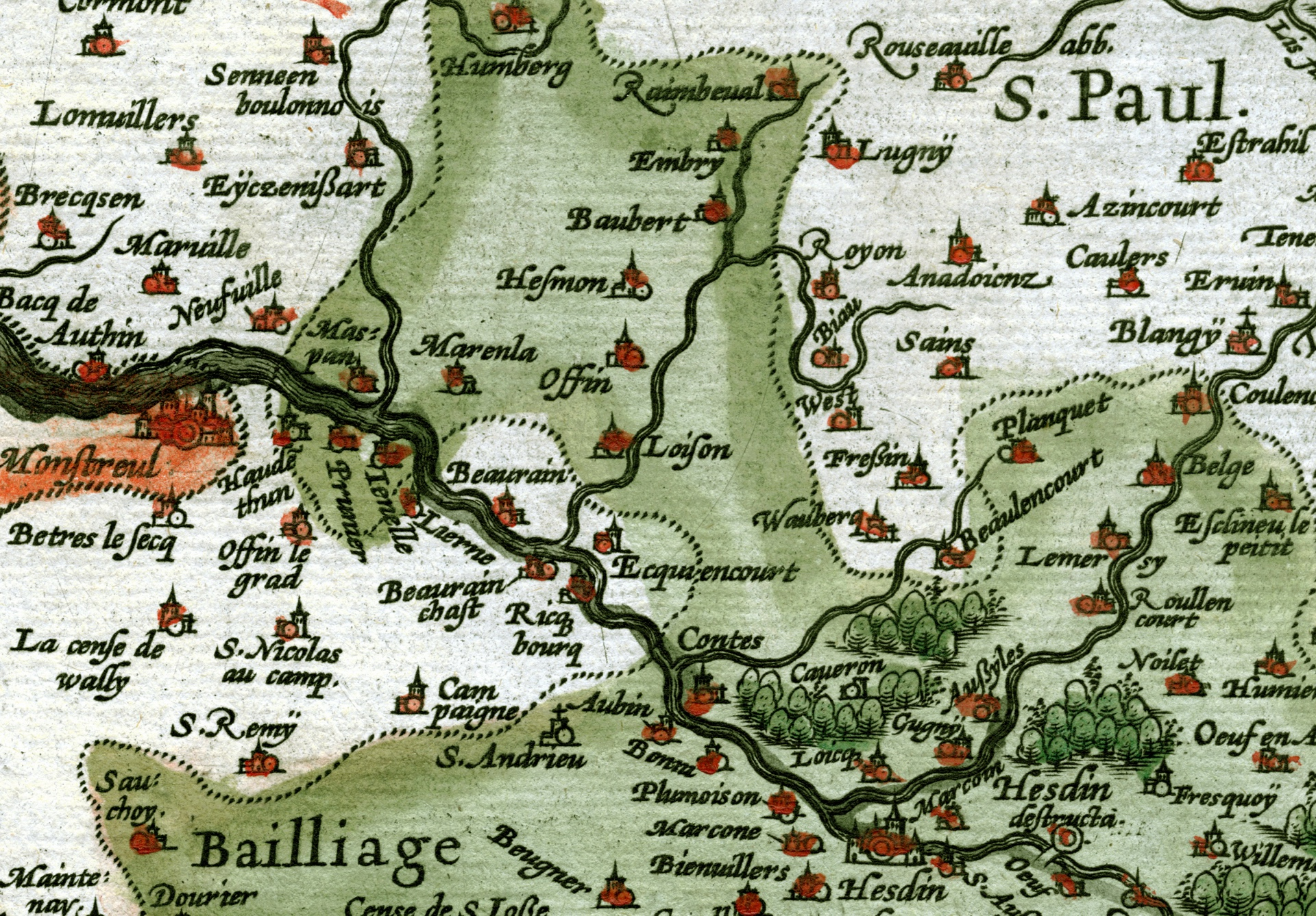
Détail of Royon.

== Places of interest ==
- The church of St. Germain, dating from the sixteenth century.

== See also ==
- Communes of the Pas-de-Calais department
