= Hesmond =

- Commune
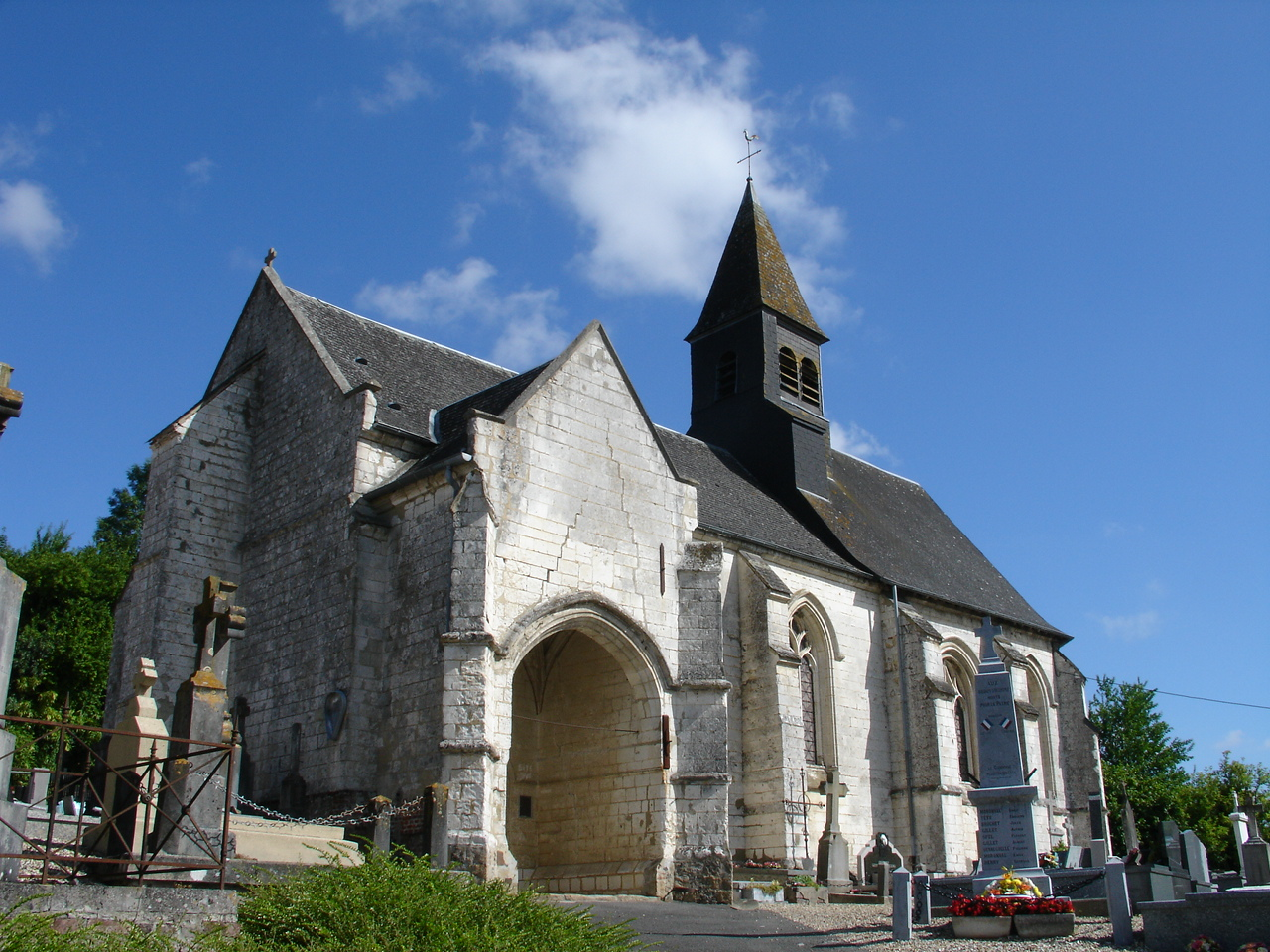
- The church of Hesmond

- Coat of arms
- Location of Hesmond
- Location within France Location within Hauts-de-France
- Coordinates: 50°27′19″N 1°56′50″E
- Country: France
- Region: Hauts-de-France
- Department: Pas-de-Calais
- Arrondissement: Montreuil
- Canton: Auxi-le-Château
- Intercommunality: CC des 7 Vallées

Government
  - Mayor (2020–2026): Pascal Deray
- Area^{1}: 8.27 km^{2} (3.19 sq mi)
- Elevation: 41 m (135 ft)
- Highest elevation: 127 m (417 ft)
- Lowest elevation: 27 m (89 ft)
- Population (2023): 172
  - Density: 20.8/km^{2} (53.9/sq mi)
- Time zone: UTC+01:00 (CET)
  - Summer (DST): UTC+02:00 (CEST)
- INSEE/Postal code: 62449 /62990
- ^{1} French Land Register data, which excludes lakes, ponds, glaciers > 1 km^{2} (0.386 sq mi or 247 acres) and river estuaries.

Hesmond is a commune in the Pas-de-Calais department in the Hauts-de-France region of France.

== Geography ==
A village situated some 8 miles (13 km) east of Montreuil-sur-Mer on the D149E1 road and in the valley of the Créquoise river.

== Population ==
Historical population
Year	Pop.	±% p.a.
1968	205	—
1975	187	−1.30%
1982	206	+1.39%
1990	186	−1.27%
1999	159	−1.73%
2007	174	+1.13%
2012	179	+0.57%
2017	165	−1.62%
2023	172	+0.69%
Source: INSEE

== Places of interest ==
- The church of St. Germain, dating from the sixteenth century.
- The eighteenth-century chateau

== See also ==
- Communes of the Pas-de-Calais department
