= Alphonse de Créquy =

Alphonse de Créquy, Comte de Canaples (died 1711), was a French aristocrat who became a close friend of King Charles II of England.

== Biography ==
Alphonse de Créquy was the second son of Charles II de Créquy, seigneur de Canaple (who was the younger son of Charles I de Blanchefort, Marquis de Créquy a Marshal of France).

In 1702 when the line of his elder brother Charles III de Créquy (1623?–1687) became extinct, de Créquy inherited the title Duc de Lesdiguires, and also eventually succeeded also to the honours of his younger brother François de Créquy (1625–1687).

De Créquy had not the talent of his brothers, and lost his various appointments in France. He went to London in 1672, where he became closely allied with Charles de Saint-Évremond, and was one of the intimates of King Charles II.
