= Boubers-lès-Hesmond =

- Commune
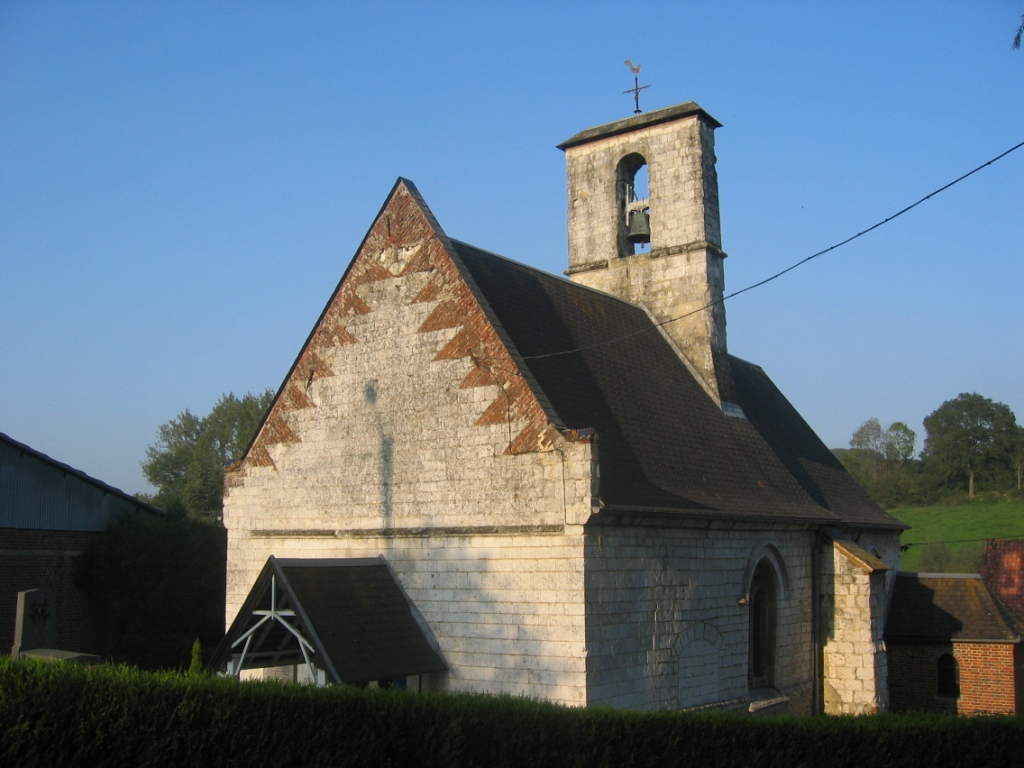
- The church of Boubers-lès-Hesmond

- Coat of arms
- Location of Boubers-lès-Hesmond
- Location within France Location within Hauts-de-France
- Coordinates: 50°28′34″N 1°57′00″E
- Country: France
- Region: Hauts-de-France
- Department: Pas-de-Calais
- Arrondissement: Montreuil
- Canton: Auxi-le-Château
- Intercommunality: CC des 7 Vallées

Government
  - Mayor (2020–2026): Francis Tetard
- Area^{1}: 1.74 km^{2} (0.67 sq mi)
- Elevation: 53 m (174 ft)
- Highest elevation: 132 m (433 ft)
- Lowest elevation: 46 m (151 ft)
- Population (2023): 68
  - Density: 39/km^{2} (100/sq mi)
- Time zone: UTC+01:00 (CET)
  - Summer (DST): UTC+02:00 (CEST)
- INSEE/Postal code: 62157 /62990
- ^{1} French Land Register data, which excludes lakes, ponds, glaciers > 1 km^{2} (0.386 sq mi or 247 acres) and river estuaries.

Boubers-lès-Hesmond is a commune in the Pas-de-Calais département in the Hauts-de-France region in northern France.

== Geography ==
Boubers-lès-Hesmond is a small village situated some 10 miles (16 km) east of Montreuil-sur-Mer on the D149 road.

== Population ==
Historical population
Year	Pop.	±% p.a.
1968	90	—
1975	85	−0.81%
1982	71	−2.54%
1990	71	+0.00%
1999	77	+0.91%
2007	69	−1.36%
2012	70	+0.29%
2017	88	+4.68%
2023	68	−4.21%
Source: INSEE

== See also ==
- Communes of the Pas-de-Calais department
