= Roussent =

- Commune
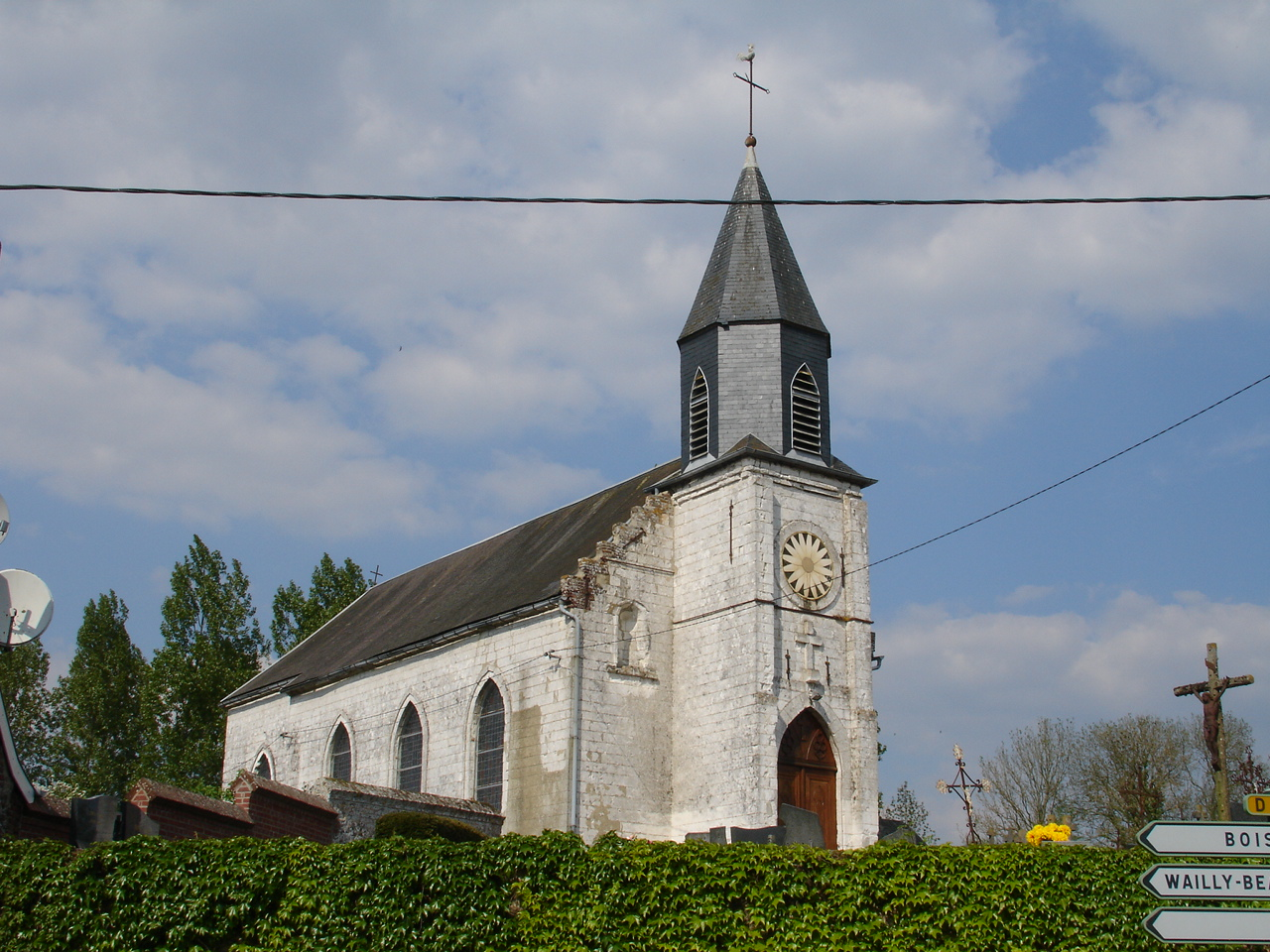
- The church of Roussent

- Coat of arms
- Location of Roussent
- Location within France Location within Hauts-de-France
- Coordinates: 50°22′09″N 1°46′33″E
- Country: France
- Region: Hauts-de-France
- Department: Pas-de-Calais
- Arrondissement: Montreuil
- Canton: Auxi-le-Château
- Intercommunality: CC des 7 Vallées

Government
  - Mayor (2020–2026): Régis Seine
- Area^{1}: 5.04 km^{2} (1.95 sq mi)
- Elevation: 11 m (36 ft)
- Highest elevation: 73 m (240 ft)
- Lowest elevation: 2 m (6.6 ft)
- Population (2023): 251
  - Density: 49.8/km^{2} (129/sq mi)
- Time zone: UTC+01:00 (CET)
  - Summer (DST): UTC+02:00 (CEST)
- INSEE/Postal code: 62723 /62870
- ^{1} French Land Register data, which excludes lakes, ponds, glaciers > 1 km^{2} (0.386 sq mi or 247 acres) and river estuaries.

Roussent (French pronunciation: [ʁusɑ̃]) is a commune in the Pas-de-Calais department in the Hauts-de-France region of France.

== Geography ==
Roussent is located 6 miles (9 km) south of Montreuil-sur-Mer on the D119 road, in the valley of the Authie river, the border with the Somme department.

== Population ==
Historical population
Year	Pop.	±% p.a.
1968	158	—
1975	148	−0.93%
1982	147	−0.10%
1990	172	+1.98%
1999	151	−1.44%
2007	196	+3.31%
2012	217	+2.06%
2017	241	+2.12%
2023	251	+0.68%
Source: INSEE

== Places of interest ==
- The church of St. Riquier, dating from the nineteenth century.
- Traces of an ancient windmill.

== See also ==
- Communes of the Pas-de-Calais department
