= Offin =

- Commune
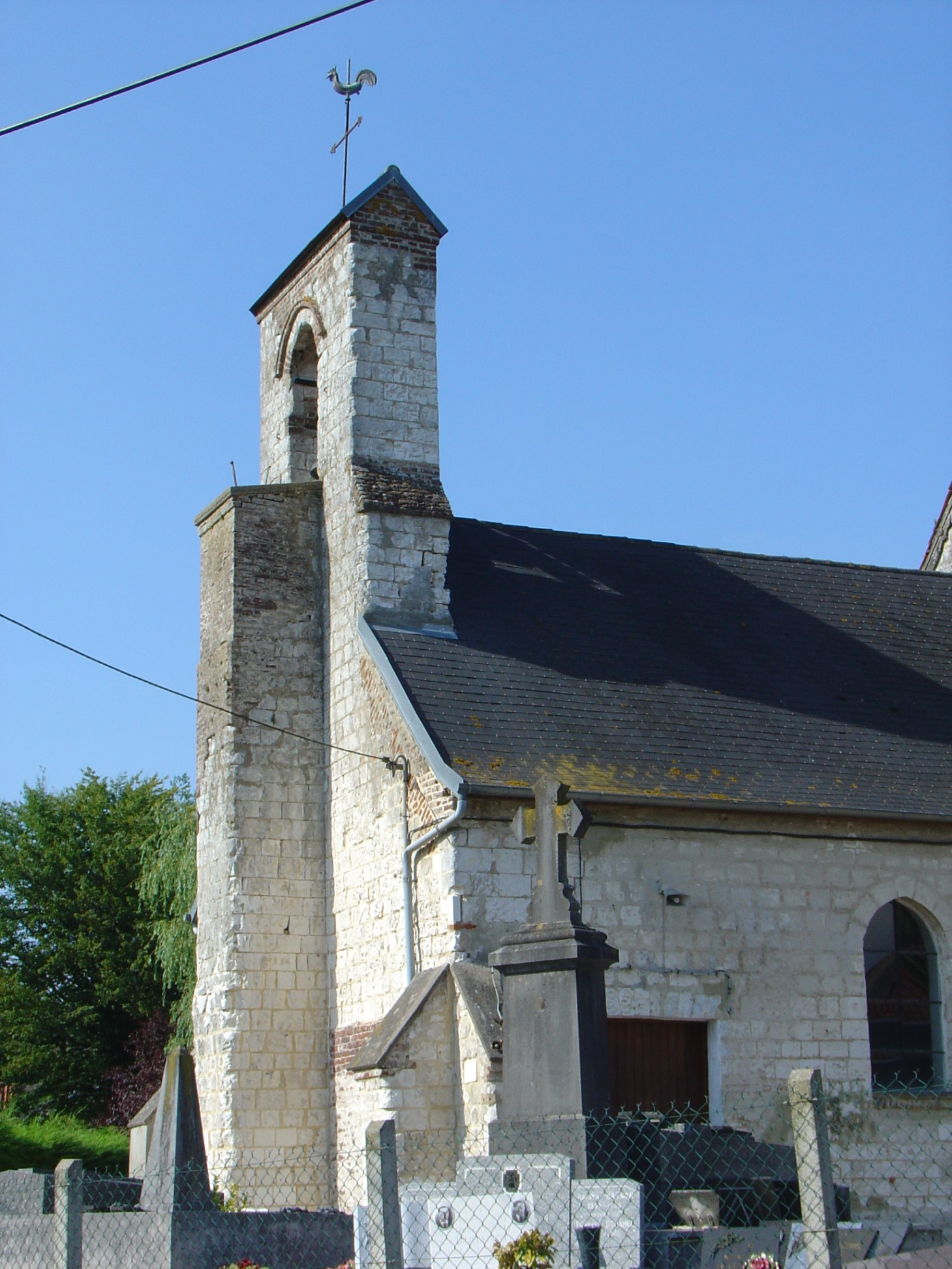
- The church of Offin

- Coat of arms
- Location of Offin
- Location within France Location within Hauts-de-France
- Coordinates: 50°26′45″N 1°56′33″E
- Country: France
- Region: Hauts-de-France
- Department: Pas-de-Calais
- Arrondissement: Montreuil
- Canton: Auxi-le-Château
- Intercommunality: CC des 7 Vallées

Government
  - Mayor (2020–2026): Roger Houzel
- Area^{1}: 5.29 km^{2} (2.04 sq mi)
- Elevation: 28 m (92 ft)
- Highest elevation: 109 m (358 ft)
- Lowest elevation: 21 m (69 ft)
- Population (2023): 210
  - Density: 40/km^{2} (100/sq mi)
- Time zone: UTC+01:00 (CET)
  - Summer (DST): UTC+02:00 (CEST)
- INSEE/Postal code: 62635 /62990
- ^{1} French Land Register data, which excludes lakes, ponds, glaciers > 1 km^{2} (0.386 sq mi or 247 acres) and river estuaries.

Offin (French pronunciation: [ɔfɛ̃]) is a commune in the Pas-de-Calais department in the Hauts-de-France region of France.

== Geography ==
Offin lies about 11 km (6.8 mi) southeast of Montreuil-sur-Mer, on the D130 road, in the valley of the Créquoise river.

== Population ==
Historical population
Year	Pop.	±% p.a.
1968	229	—
1975	180	−3.38%
1982	191	+0.85%
1990	187	−0.26%
1999	187	+0.00%
2007	193	+0.40%
2012	211	+1.80%
2017	207	−0.38%
2023	210	+0.24%
Source: INSEE

== Places of interest ==
- The fifteenth century church of St.Sylvain.

== See also ==
- Communes of the Pas-de-Calais department
