= Loison-sur-Créquoise =

- Commune
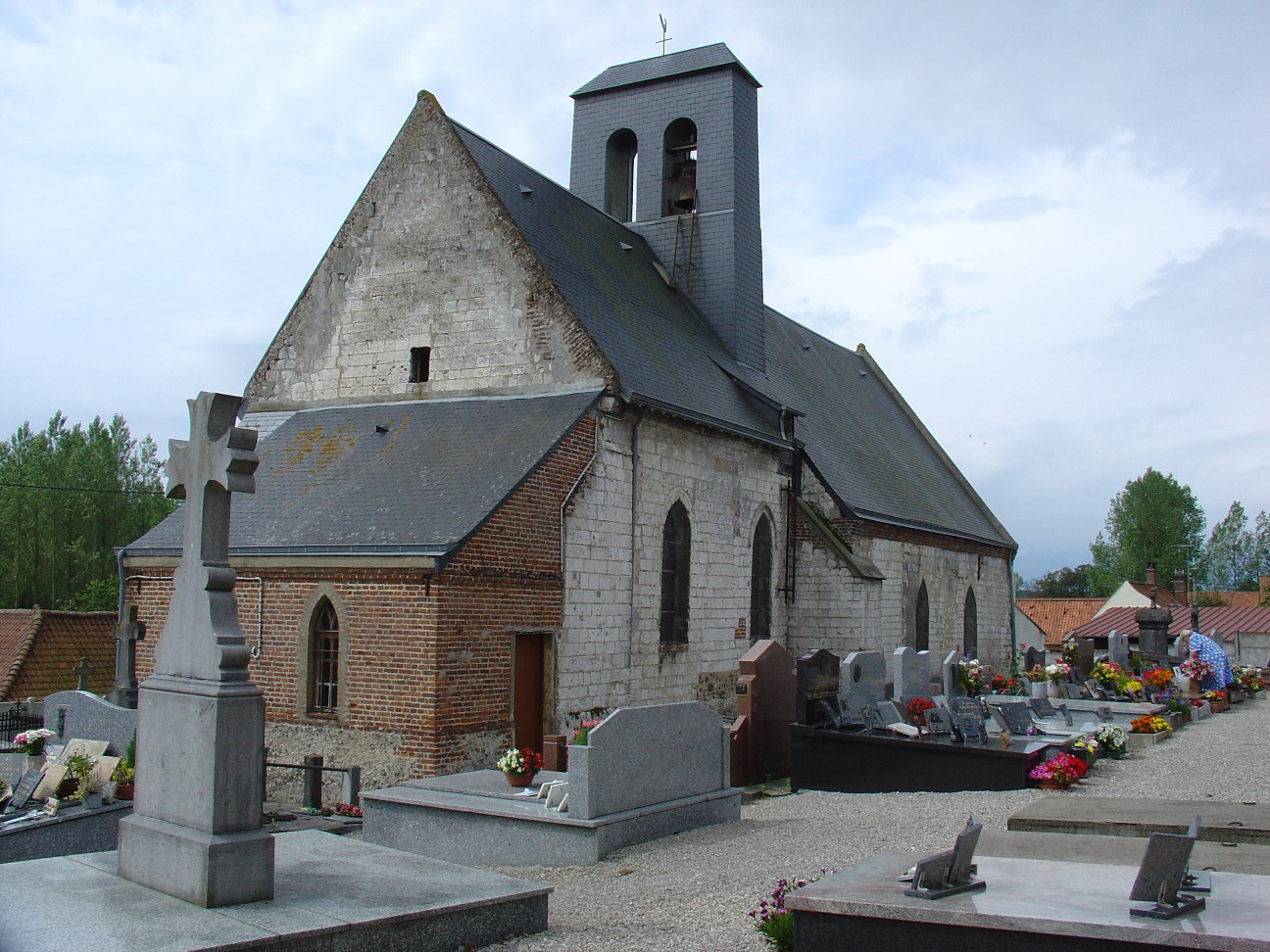
- The church of Loison-sur-Créquoise

- Coat of arms
- Location of Loison-sur-Créquoise
- Location within France Location within Hauts-de-France
- Coordinates: 50°26′24″N 1°55′24″E
- Country: France
- Region: Hauts-de-France
- Department: Pas-de-Calais
- Arrondissement: Montreuil
- Canton: Auxi-le-Château
- Intercommunality: CC des 7 Vallées

Government
  - Mayor (2020–2026): Daniel Septier
- Area^{1}: 9.07 km^{2} (3.50 sq mi)
- Elevation: 33 m (108 ft)
- Highest elevation: 107 m (351 ft)
- Lowest elevation: 12 m (39 ft)
- Population (2023): 252
  - Density: 27.8/km^{2} (72.0/sq mi)
- Time zone: UTC+01:00 (CET)
  - Summer (DST): UTC+02:00 (CEST)
- INSEE/Postal code: 62522 /62990
- ^{1} French Land Register data, which excludes lakes, ponds, glaciers > 1 km^{2} (0.386 sq mi or 247 acres) and river estuaries.

Loison-sur-Créquoise (French pronunciation: [lwazɔ̃ syʁ kʁekwaz], literally Loison on Créquoise; Picard: Logeon-su-Créquoése) is a commune in the Pas-de-Calais department in the Hauts-de-France region of France.

== Geography ==
Loison-sur-Créquoise is situated 7 miles (11 km) southeast of Montreuil-sur-Mer on the D130 road and in the Créquoise river valley.

== Population ==
Historical population
Year	Pop.	±% p.a.
1968	269	—
1975	247	−1.21%
1982	247	+0.00%
1990	268	+1.03%
1999	236	−1.40%
2007	235	−0.05%
2012	244	+0.75%
2017	266	+1.74%
2023	252	−0.90%
Source: INSEE

== Places of interest ==
- The nineteenth century church of Saint Omer

== See also ==
- Communes of the Pas-de-Calais department
