= Fressin =

- Commune
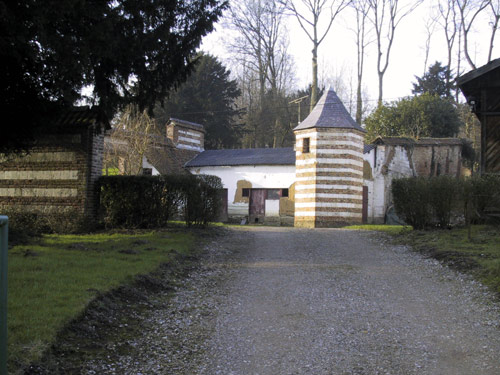
- Pigeon house at the home of Bernanos

- Coat of arms
- Location of Fressin
- Location within France Location within Hauts-de-France
- Coordinates: 50°26′50″N 2°03′20″E
- Country: France
- Region: Hauts-de-France
- Department: Pas-de-Calais
- Arrondissement: Montreuil
- Canton: Fruges
- Intercommunality: CC Haut Pays du Montreuillois

Government
  - Mayor (2020–2026): Claude Vergeot
- Area^{1}: 17.17 km^{2} (6.63 sq mi)
- Elevation: 84 m (276 ft)
- Highest elevation: 144 m (472 ft)
- Lowest elevation: 43 m (141 ft)
- Population (2023): 579
  - Density: 33.7/km^{2} (87.3/sq mi)
- Time zone: UTC+01:00 (CET)
  - Summer (DST): UTC+02:00 (CEST)
- INSEE/Postal code: 62359 /62140
- ^{1} French Land Register data, which excludes lakes, ponds, glaciers > 1 km^{2} (0.386 sq mi or 247 acres) and river estuaries.

Fressin (French pronunciation: [fʁɛsɛ̃]) is a commune in the Pas-de-Calais department in the Hauts-de-France region of France 14 miles (23 km) east of Montreuil in the valley of the Planquette.

== Population ==
Historical population
Year	Pop.	±% p.a.
1968	536	—
1975	525	−0.30%
1982	585	+1.56%
1990	577	−0.17%
1999	563	−0.27%
2007	544	−0.43%
2012	536	−0.30%
2017	575	+1.41%
2023	579	+0.12%
Source: INSEE

== Notable people ==
- Georges Bernanos, poet and writer, spent his youth here until 1924.

== See also ==
- Communes of the Pas-de-Calais department
