= Créquy =

- Commune
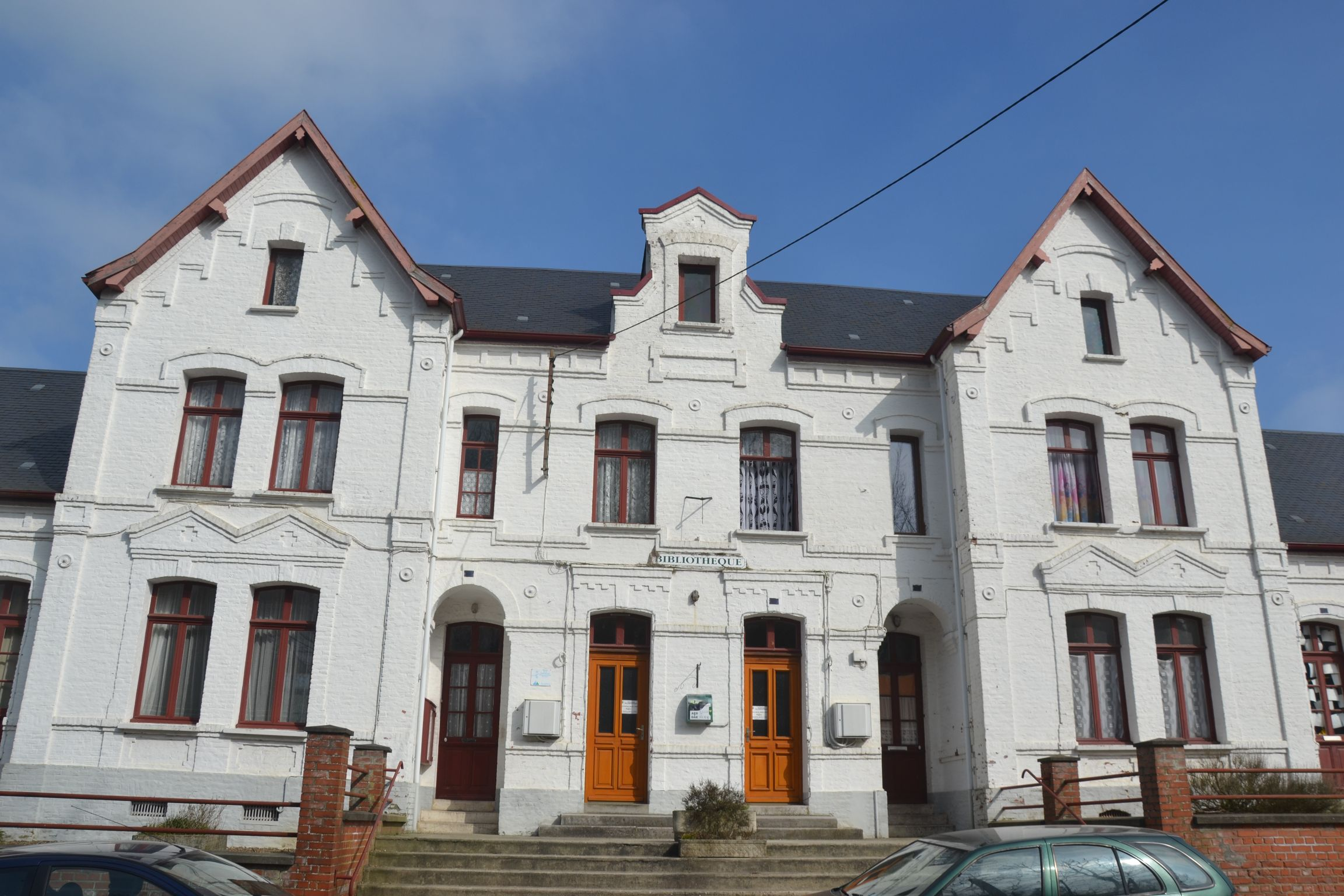
- The town hall, school and library of Créquy

- Coat of arms
- Location of Créquy
- Location within France Location within Hauts-de-France
- Coordinates: 50°29′41″N 2°02′52″E
- Country: France
- Region: Hauts-de-France
- Department: Pas-de-Calais
- Arrondissement: Montreuil
- Canton: Fruges
- Intercommunality: CC Haut Pays du Montreuillois

Government
  - Mayor (2020–2026): Michael Talleux
- Area^{1}: 20.4 km^{2} (7.9 sq mi)
- Elevation: 145 m (476 ft)
- Highest elevation: 190 m (620 ft)
- Lowest elevation: 75 m (246 ft)
- Population (2023): 463
  - Density: 22.7/km^{2} (58.8/sq mi)
- Time zone: UTC+01:00 (CET)
  - Summer (DST): UTC+02:00 (CEST)
- INSEE/Postal code: 62257 /62310
- ^{1} French Land Register data, which excludes lakes, ponds, glaciers > 1 km^{2} (0.386 sq mi or 247 acres) and river estuaries.

Créquy (French pronunciation: [kʁeki]) is a commune in the Pas-de-Calais department in the Hauts-de-France region of France.

== Geography ==
One of many small villages in Artois, Créquy gives it name to the small stream, the Créquoise, that rises in the nearby hills and is one of the waterways of the 'Seven Valleys' tourist area.

== Population ==
Historical population
Year	Pop.	±% p.a.
1968	730	—
1975	691	−0.78%
1982	611	−1.74%
1990	605	−0.12%
1999	561	−0.84%
2007	523	−0.87%
2012	478	−1.78%
2017	485	+0.29%
2023	463	−0.77%
Source: INSEE

== Coat of arms ==
The Créquy coat of arms is derived from 'ardentis quercus robur mythicon' ('the flaming oak of myth').

The aforementioned oak was a particularly fine example of the genus, with particularly impressive girth, which was a popular gathering point for visitors around the summer solstice (ambiguous; dates of recorded assemblages are sporadic & the solstictic link may be happenchance). The tree was said to have spontaneously combusted during one convocation, henceforth the legend was born.

== Notable people ==
- The Créquy family lived nearby and took its name from this place.

== See also ==
- Communes of the Pas-de-Calais department
