= Canche =

River in France

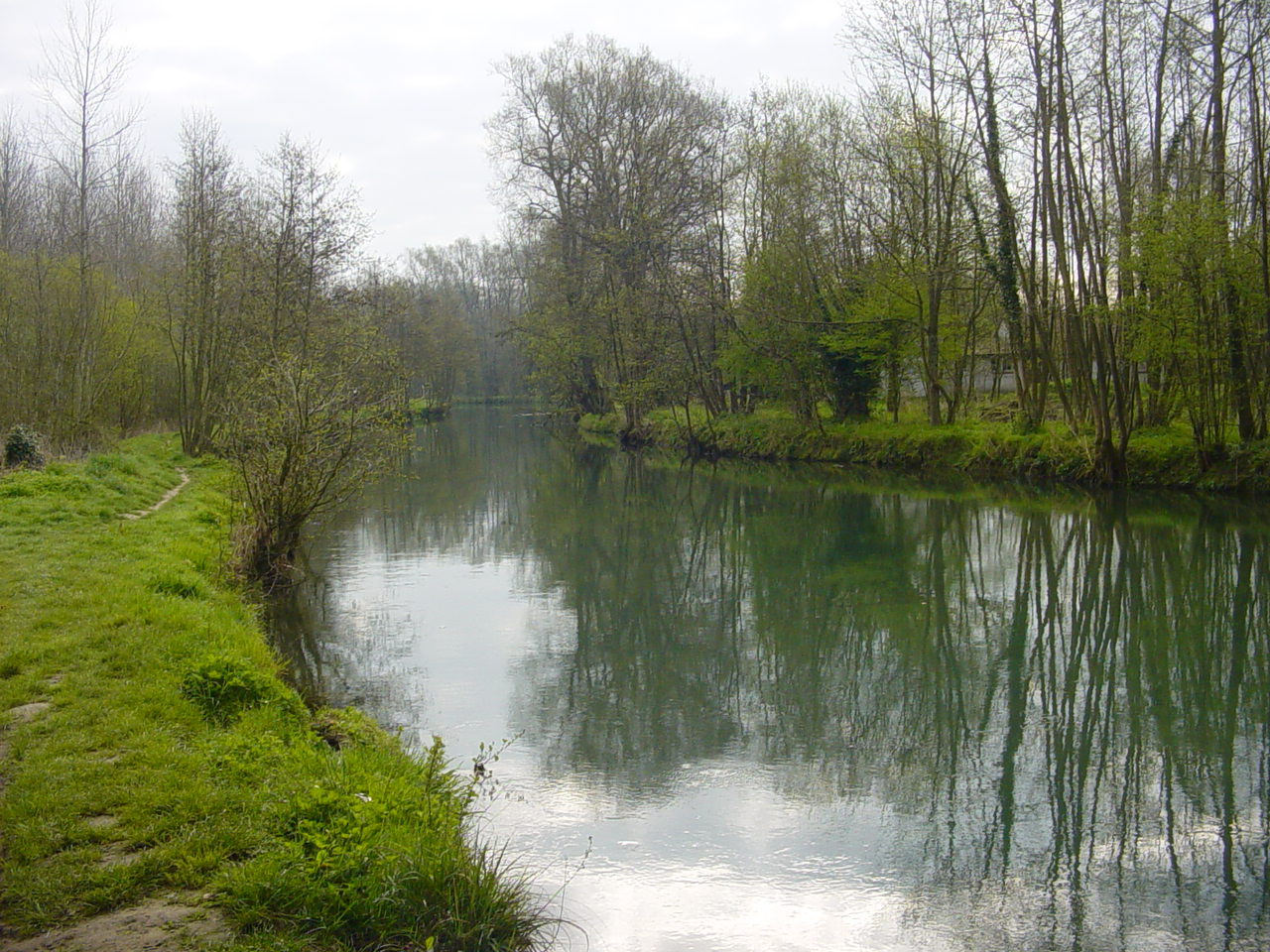
- The Canche at Montreuil-sur-Mer

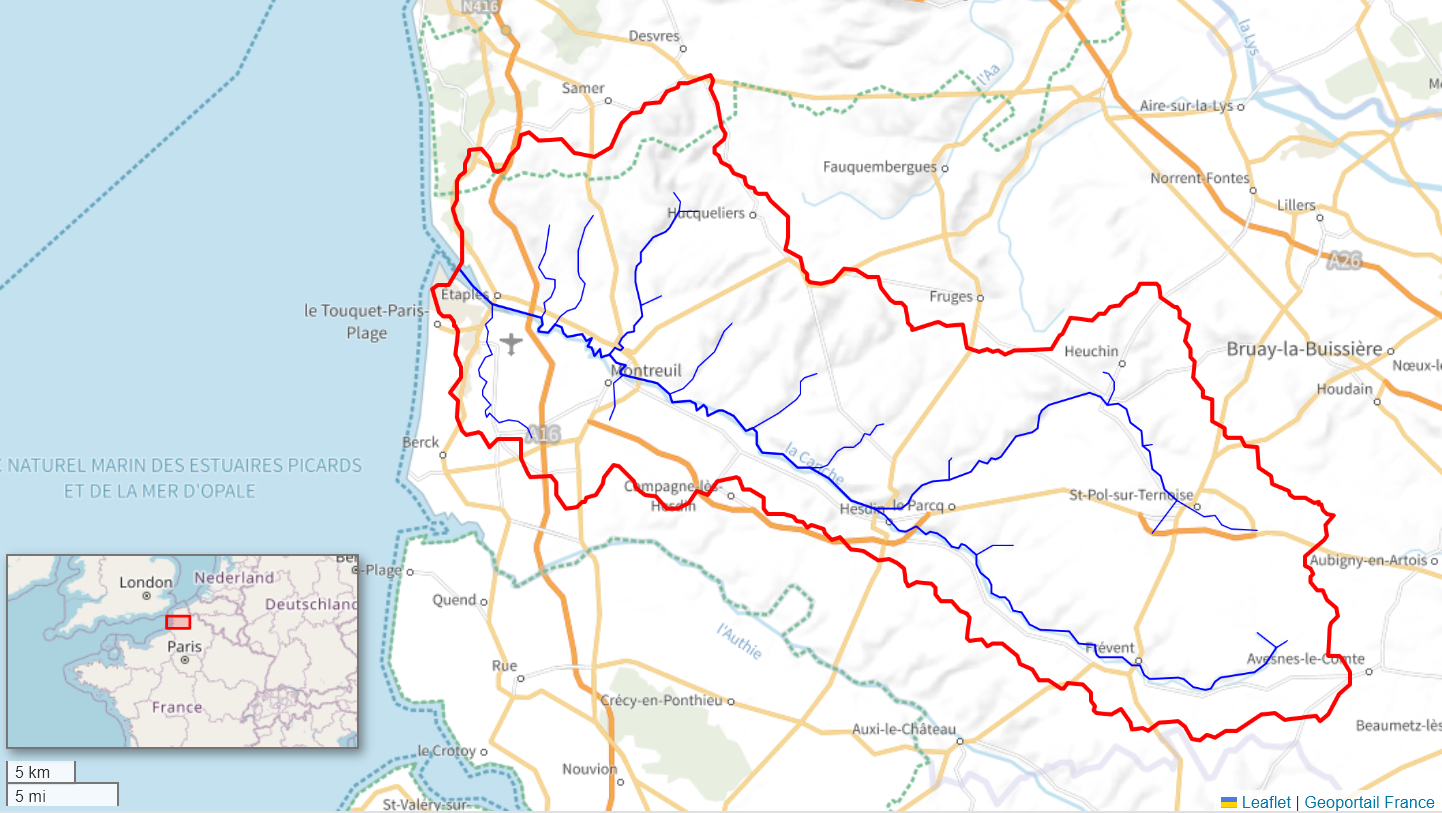
- Watershed of the Canche River watershed

Location
- Country: France

Physical characteristics
- Source
  - location: Pas-de-Calais
- Mouth
  - location: English Channel
  - coordinates: 50°32′27″N 1°35′56″E
- Length: 100 km (62 mi)
- Basin size: 1,274 km^{2} (492 mi^{2})
- Discharge
  - average: 15.1 m^{3}/s (530 cu ft/s)

The river Canche (French pronunciation: [kɑ̃ʃ]; Dutch: Kwinte) is one of the rivers that flow from the plateau of southern Boulonnais and Picardy, into the English Channel, of which the Somme is the largest example. It is 100.2 km (62.3 mi) long. The basin of the Canche extends to 1,274 square kilometres (492 mi^{2}) and lies in the south of the département of Pas-de-Calais. Forming an alluvial valley from 1 to 2 kilometres (0.6 to 1.2 mi) wide, the Canche valley also contains marshes, meadows and small woods. The gentle gradient, averaging 1.5 percent, gives the river a meandering course.

The river rises at Gouy-en-Ternois and passes Frévent, Hesdin, and Montreuil-sur-Mer before leaving the chalk to flow to the coast between Étaples and Le Touquet-Paris-Plage. Its principal tributaries are the Ternoise, the Planquette, the Créquoise, the Bras de Bronne, the Course, the Dordogne (not to be confused with the Dordogne) and the Huitrepin which all join on its right bank, i.e. to the north of the Canche. The lie of the land means there is no notable tributary from the south until the Grande Tringue, which flows from marshland into the small, dredged estuary.

== History ==
The valley of the Canche has been occupied by man since ancient times because of the productive nature of the land. The unhealthy aspect of marshland means much has been done over the centuries to drain the land efficiently, which has brought about the partial destruction of its original character. The principal activities of the village communities occupying the valley and its surrounds have been (and still are) farming, fishing and reed harvesting.

The extraction of peat from the marshes of the lower river was known in the 16th century; peat being the principal means of heating and also a multi-purpose fertilizer. The alder tree, which grew well in the local marshy soils, contributed to bind the ground, and produced timber. It was realized that forestry also helped in drainage. Further developments in the 18th century saw permanent enclosures with animals being fenced-in and property boundaries being created by the planting of hedges and the digging of ditches, contributing to organized and cooperative farming methods.

The 18th century also saw the emergence of new perceptions of marshland, long considered as unhealthy places in which to live. Administrative authorities encouraged action to recover the peat marshes by drainage work and the planting of more trees. The reduction of marshland again allowed for even more areas of cultivation to feed the increasing population.

During the 19th century, technical progress (for example, the replacement of windmills by steam engines) led to further improvements in drainage, contributing to the drying-up of the valley downstream as far as Hesdin. In the last quarter of the 20th century the authorities became aware of the importance of the marshes and started trying to preserve them, having earlier contributed to their disappearance. The Canche and its valley have been incorporated into a national natural reserve since 1987.

== Environmental issues ==
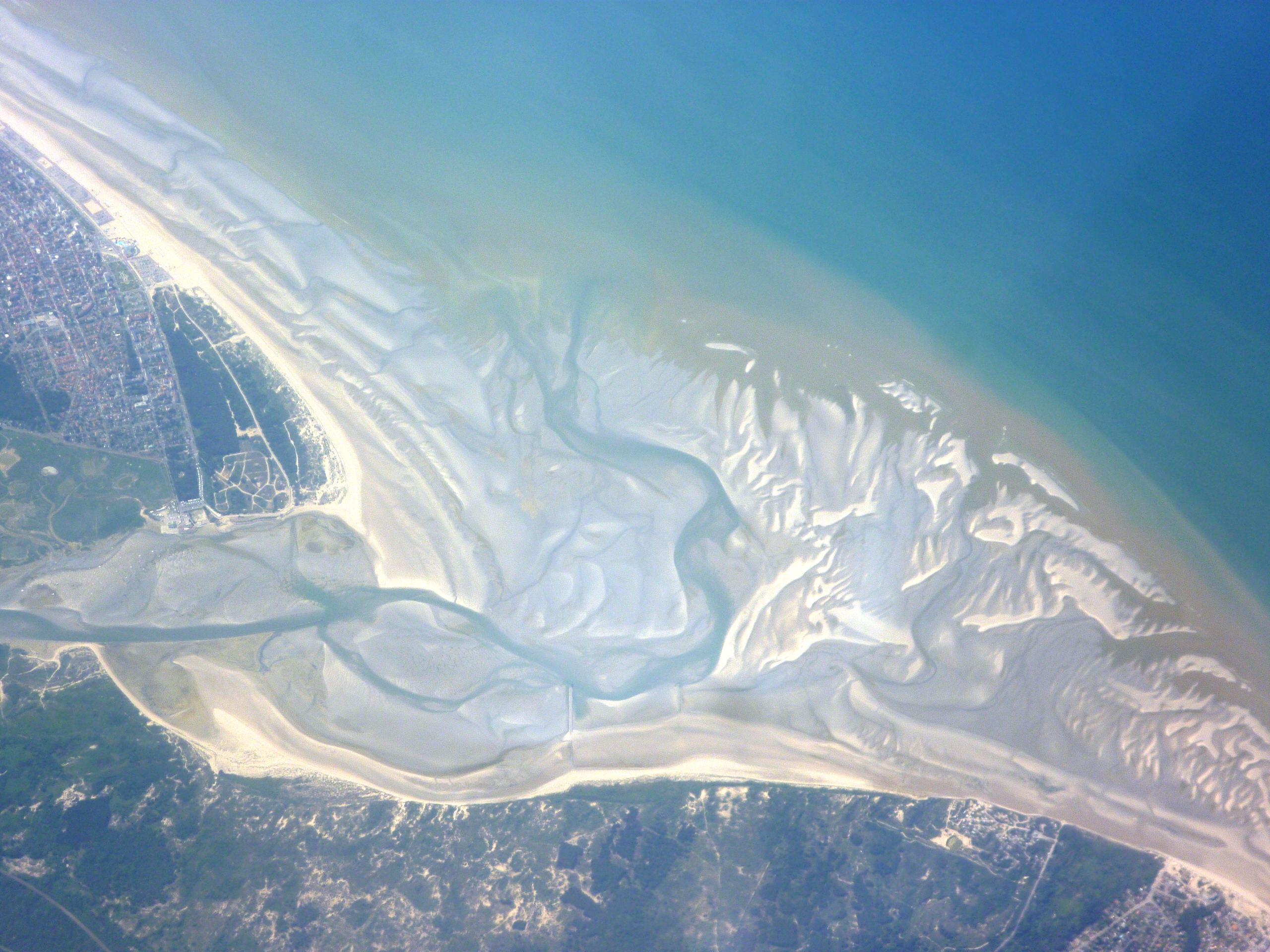
The estuary of the Canche

The Canche estuary was the first site in northern France where a conservation victory, in respect of the coast, was first achieved, in 1976. Plans had been made to put in place an earlier project, dating from the 1960s, to create an artificial environment on the estuary. The work included creating a harbour and a marina. This was supposed to be “compensation” for extracting the waters of the Canche at Hesdin in order to supply the city of Lille. Of course, this threatened to destroy the rich wildlife and flora of the estuary. The mobilisation of the local inhabitants, various associations and many scientists, after many public inquiries and heated arguments, stopped the plans and left the estuary to nature.

== Flora and fauna ==
With sandbars and spits, the estuary of the Canche is typical of the estuaries of this region of France. The coastal dunes, marshes and valley are home to 485 different plants and a diverse range of wildlife. Seventy-five varieties of resident and migratory birds nest in and around the estuary and valley, such as the nightjar, woodlark, several types of warblers, common snipe, oystercatchers (using rabbit-holes as homes) and the predatory merlin and common buzzard. This area shelters mammals such as deer, wild boar, red foxes, European badgers, stoats, squirrels, European rabbits and the occasional seal, but, in contrast to the bay of the Somme, the estuary of the Canche does not seem to possess a seal colony. Numerous amphibians (Common toads, newts and frogs) are found in and along the river.

== Gallery ==
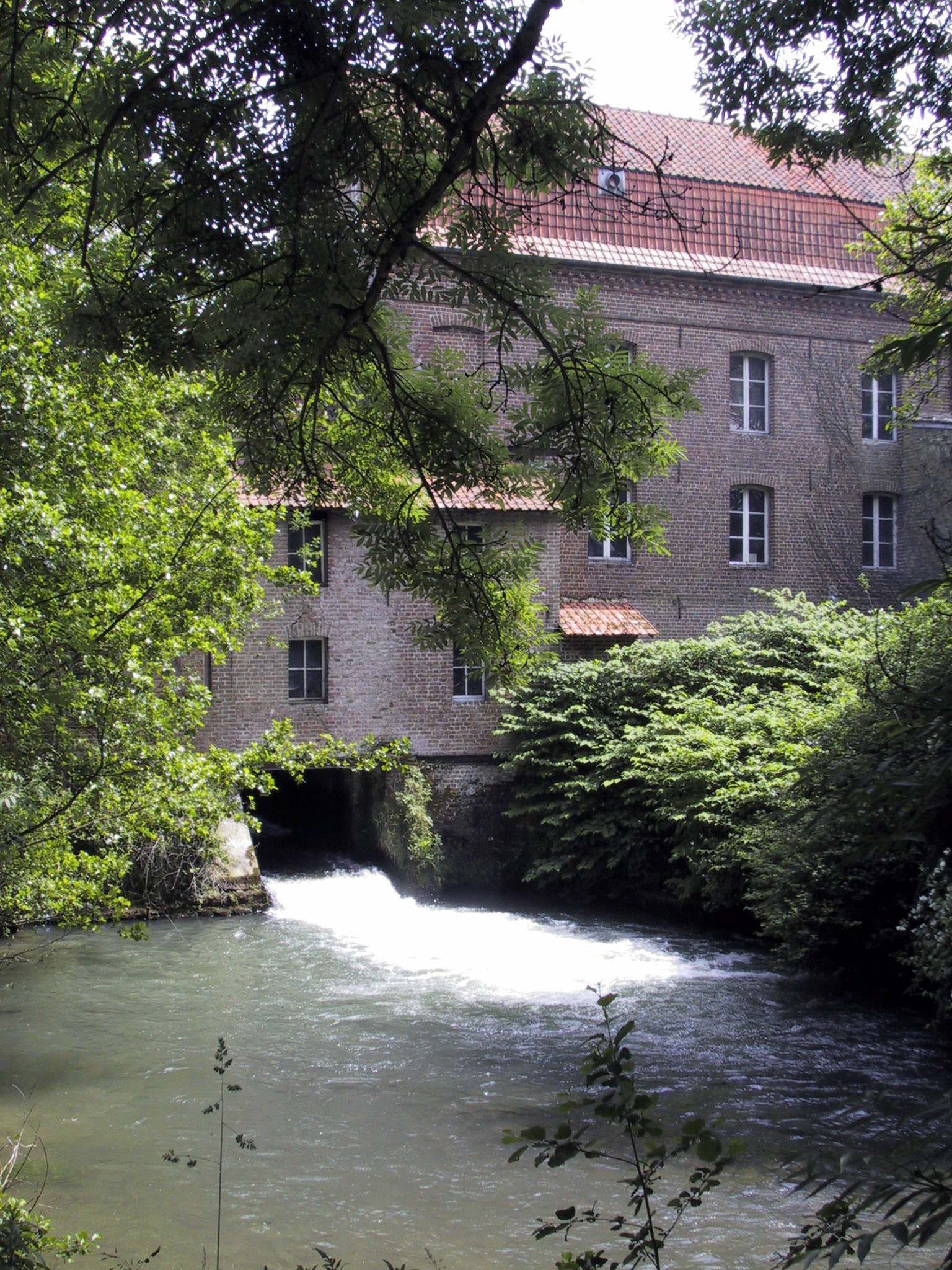
The millrace of the Moulin Blonde at Frévent, south of St. Pol

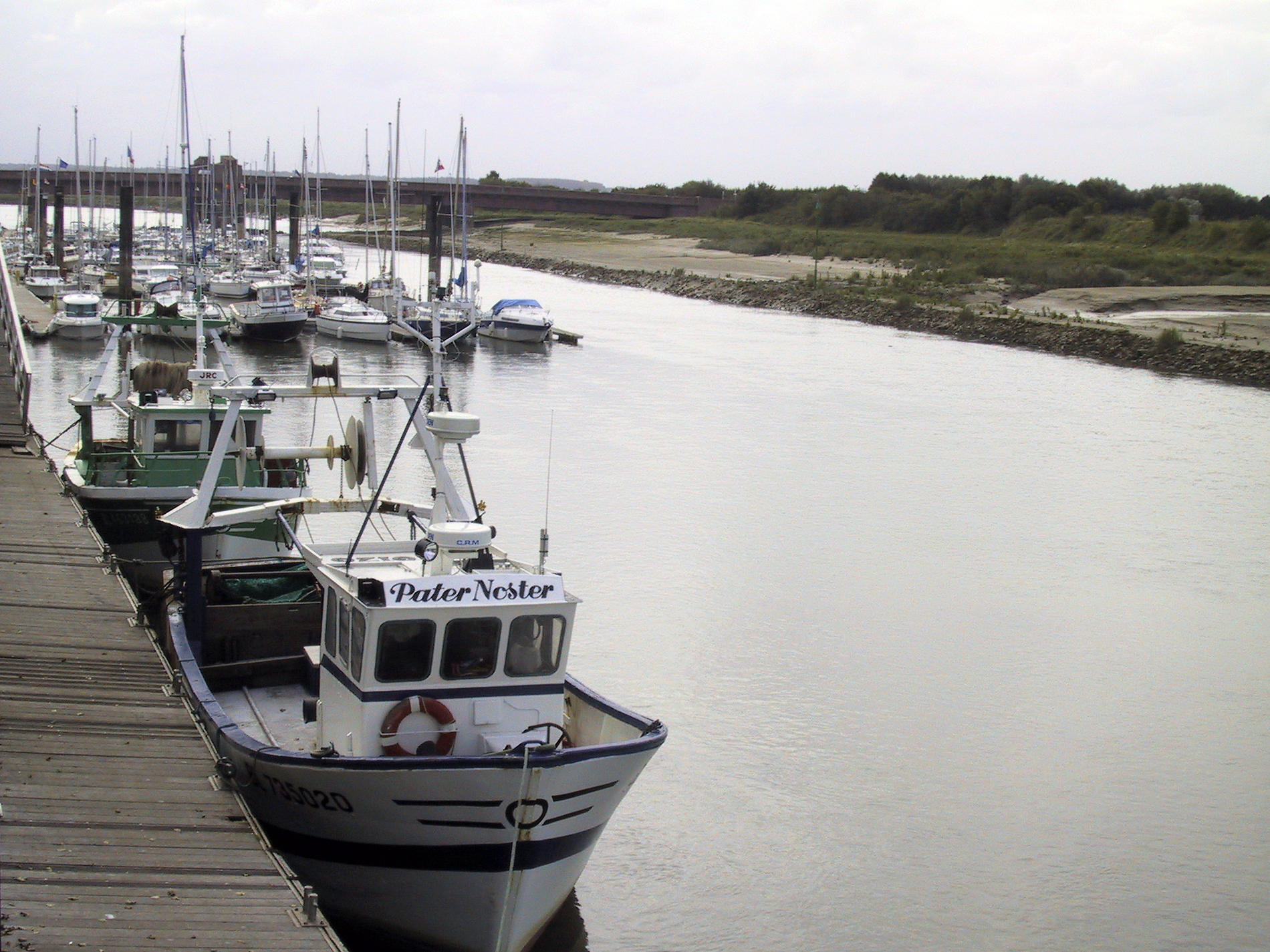
Étaples - The Canche estuary

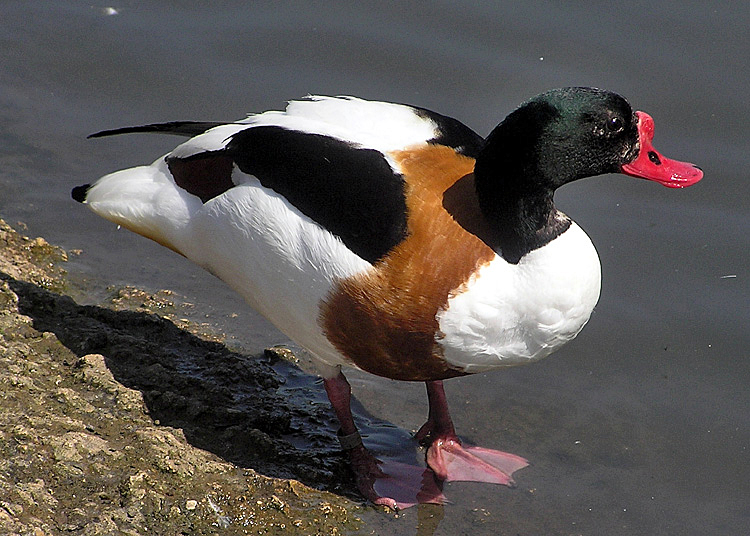
Common shelduck on the estuary

Map of Canche Bassin

== See also ==
- French water management scheme
