= Bellinghem =

- Commune
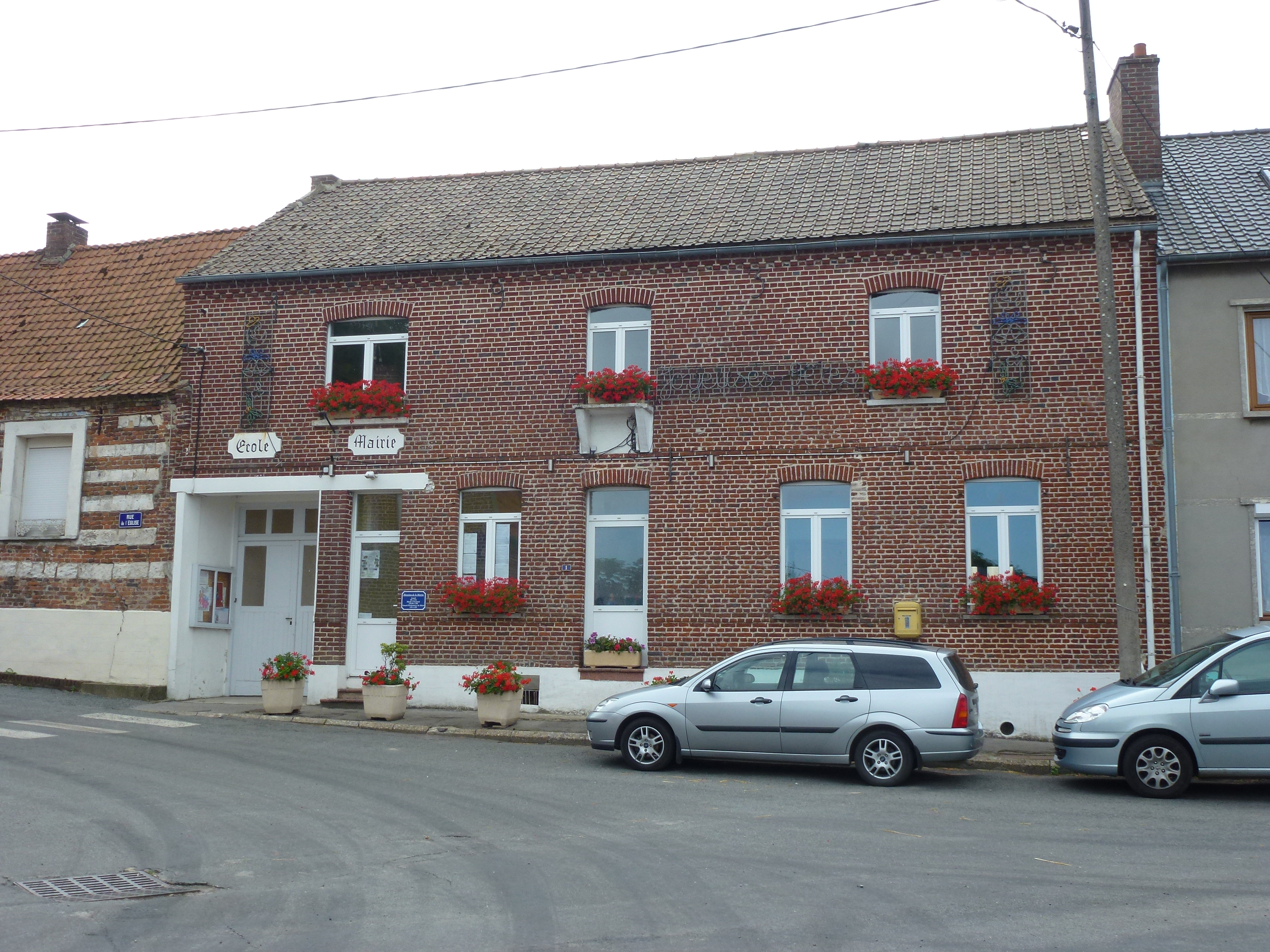
- The town hall and school in Herbelles
- Location of Bellinghem
- Location within France Location within Hauts-de-France
- Coordinates: 50°39′43″N 2°13′59″E
- Country: France
- Region: Hauts-de-France
- Department: Pas-de-Calais
- Arrondissement: Saint-Omer
- Canton: Fruges
- Intercommunality: Pays de Saint-Omer

Government
  - Mayor (2020–2026): Françoise Vasseur
- Area^{1}: 7.74 km^{2} (2.99 sq mi)
- Population (2023): 1,062
  - Density: 137/km^{2} (355/sq mi)
- Time zone: UTC+01:00 (CET)
  - Summer (DST): UTC+02:00 (CEST)
- INSEE/Postal code: 62471 /62129
- ^{1} French Land Register data, which excludes lakes, ponds, glaciers > 1 km^{2} (0.386 sq mi or 247 acres) and river estuaries.

Bellinghem (French pronunciation: [bɛlɛ̃ɡɛm]; Picard: Bellinghin) is a commune in the Pas-de-Calais department of northern France. The municipality was established on 1 September 2016 and consists of the former communes of Herbelles and Inghem.

== See also ==
- Communes of the Pas-de-Calais department
