= Inghem =

Commune in Pas-de-Calais, France

- Delegated commune of Bellinghem
- Coat of arms
- Location of Inghem
- Location within France Location within Hauts-de-France
- Coordinates: 50°40′05″N 2°14′41″E
- Country: France
- Region: Hauts-de-France
- Department: Pas-de-Calais
- Arrondissement: Saint-Omer
- Canton: Fruges
- Commune: Bellinghem
- Area^{1}: 3.19 km^{2} (1.23 sq mi)
- Elevation: 64 m (210 ft)
- Highest elevation: 95 m (312 ft)
- Lowest elevation: 42 m (138 ft)
- Population (2023): 542
  - Density: 170/km^{2} (440/sq mi)
- Time zone: UTC+01:00 (CET)
  - Summer (DST): UTC+02:00 (CEST)
- Postal code: 62129
- ^{1} French Land Register data, which excludes lakes, ponds, glaciers > 1 km^{2} (0.386 sq mi or 247 acres) and river estuaries.

Inghem (French pronunciation: [ɛ̃ɡɛm]; Picard: Inghin) is a former commune in the Pas-de-Calais department in the Hauts-de-France region of France. On 1 September 2016, it was merged into the new commune Bellinghem, of which it became a delegated commune.

== Geography ==
A village situated 6 miles (9 km) south of Saint-Omer, at the D198 and D201 crossroads. A junction with the A26 autoroute is less than a mile away.

== Places of interest ==
- The church of Notre-Dame, dating from the eighteenth century.

== See also ==
- Communes of the Pas-de-Calais department
