= Herbelles =

- Delegated commune of Bellinghem
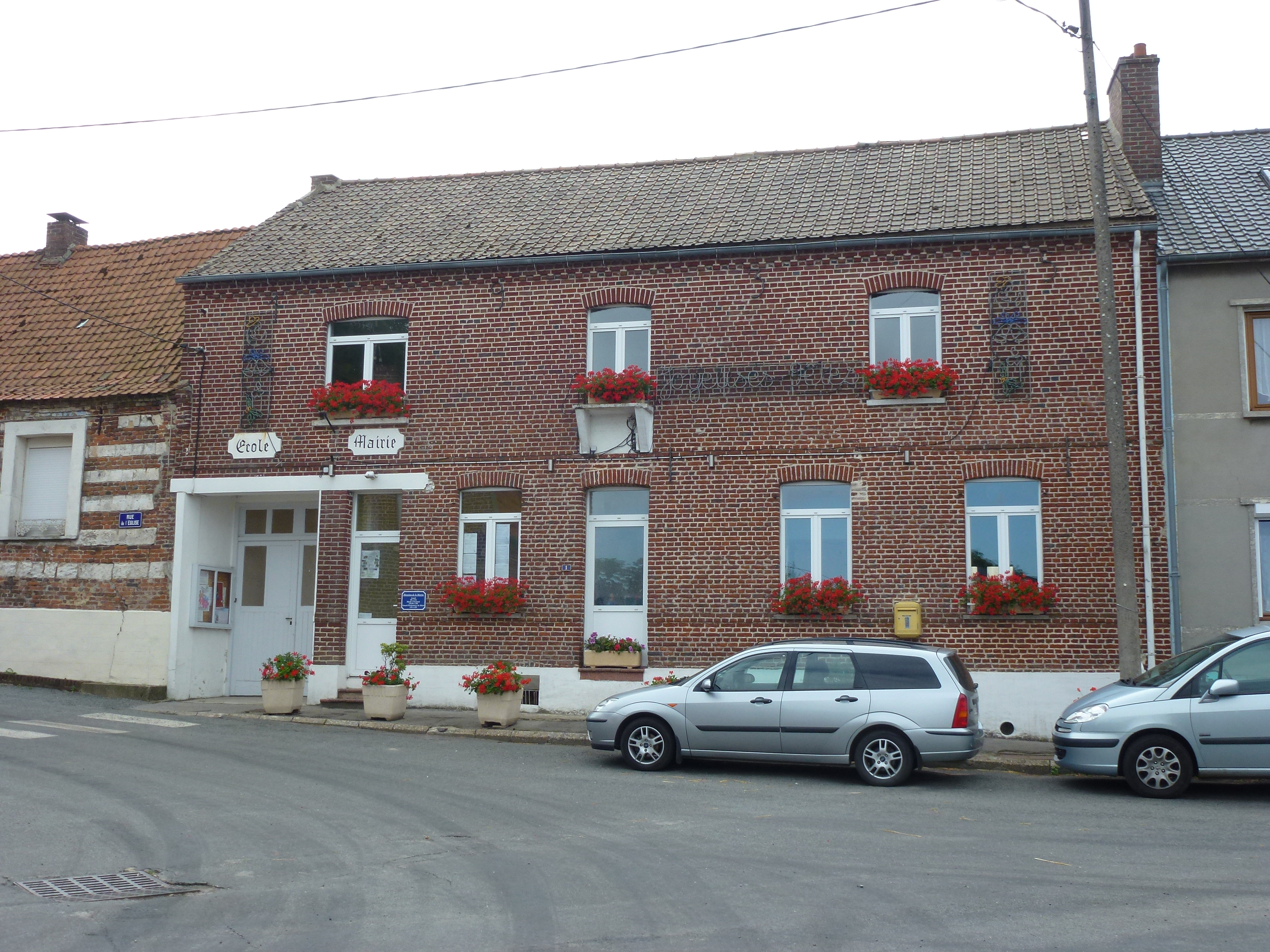
- Town hall

- Coat of arms
- Location of Herbelles
- Location within France Location within Hauts-de-France
- Coordinates: 50°39′22″N 2°13′24″E
- Country: France
- Region: Hauts-de-France
- Department: Pas-de-Calais
- Arrondissement: Saint-Omer
- Canton: Fruges
- Commune: Bellinghem
- Area^{1}: 4.55 km^{2} (1.76 sq mi)
- Elevation: 100 m (330 ft)
- Highest elevation: 110 m (360 ft)
- Lowest elevation: 55 m (180 ft)
- Population (2023): 520
  - Density: 110/km^{2} (300/sq mi)
- Time zone: UTC+01:00 (CET)
  - Summer (DST): UTC+02:00 (CEST)
- Postal code: 62129
- ^{1} French Land Register data, which excludes lakes, ponds, glaciers > 1 km^{2} (0.386 sq mi or 247 acres) and river estuaries.

Herbelles (French pronunciation: [ɛʁbɛl]) is a former commune in the Pas-de-Calais department in the Hauts-de-France region of France. On 1 September 2016, it was merged into the new commune Bellinghem, of which it became a delegated commune.

== Geography ==
A small village situated 5 miles (8 km) south of Saint-Omer, at the D192 and D201 crossroads.

== Places of interest ==
- The church of St. Leger, dating from the seventeenth century.
- Two 17th-century farm houses.

== See also ==
- Communes of the Pas-de-Calais department
