= Communauté de communes Artois-Lys =

Coordinates: 50.5627°N 2.4807°E

Artois-Lys
- Former communauté de communes
- Interactive map of Artois-Lys
- Country: France
- Region: Hauts-de-France
- Department: Pas-de-Calais
- No. of communes: {{{nbcomm}}}
- Established: 1993
- Disbanded: 2017
- Area: 159.32 km^{2} (61.51 sq mi)
- Population (1999): 33,560
  - Density: 210.6/km^{2} (545.6/sq mi)

The Communauté de communes Artois-Lys was located in the Pas-de-Calais département, in northern France. It was created in January 1993. It was merged into the Communauté d'agglomération de Béthune-Bruay, Artois-Lys Romane in January 2017.

== Composition ==
It comprised the following 21 communes:

1. Allouagne
2. Ames
3. Amettes
4. Auchy-au-Bois
5. Bourecq
6. Burbure
7. Busnes
8. Calonne-sur-la-Lys
9. Ecquedecques
10. Ferfay
11. Gonnehem
12. Ham-en-Artois
13. Lespesses
14. Lières
15. Lillers
16. Mont-Bernanchon
17. Norrent-Fontes
18. Robecq
19. Saint-Floris
20. Saint-Venant
21. Westrehem
