= Sains-lès-Pernes =

- Commune
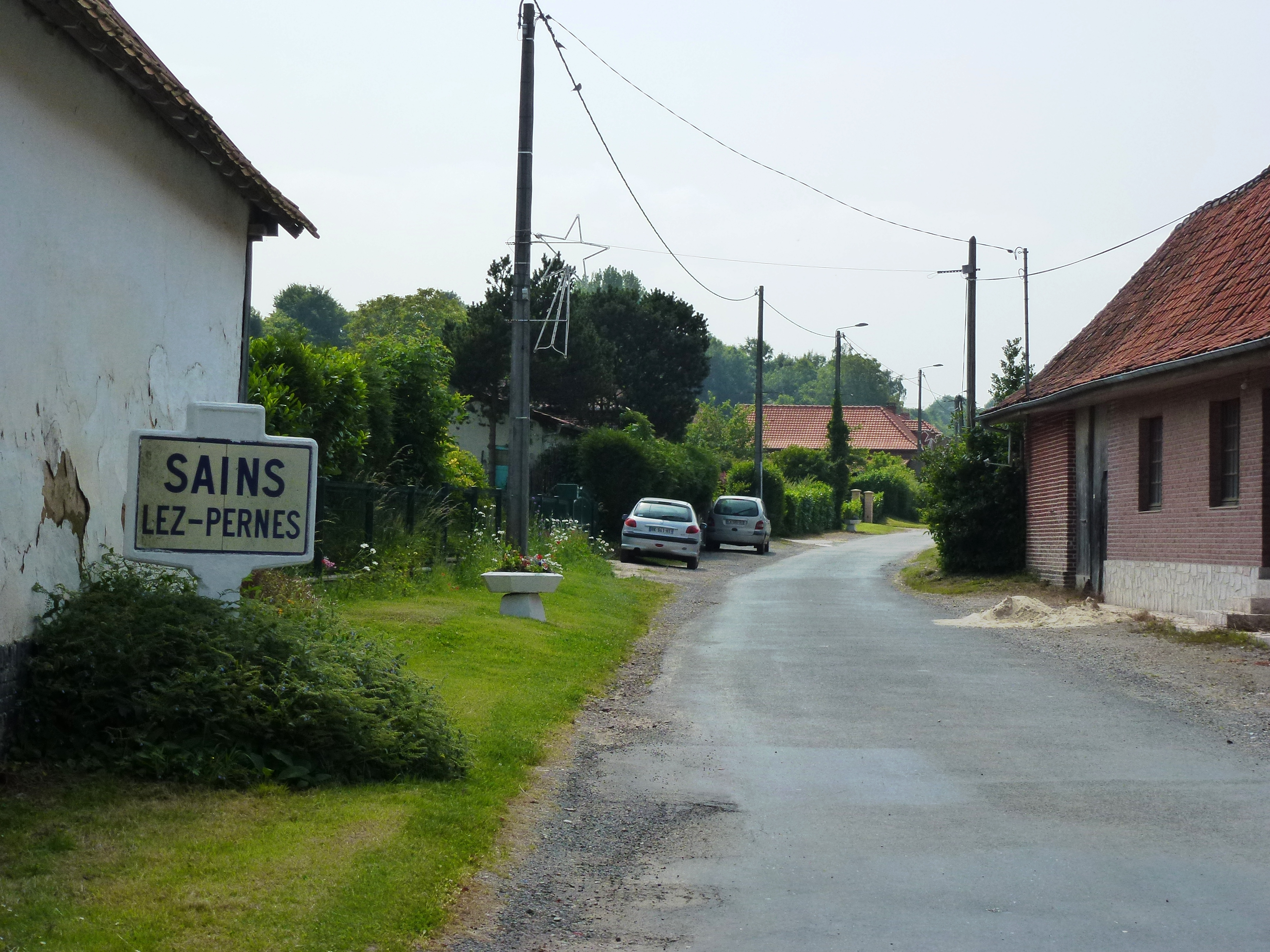
- The road into of Sains-lès-Pernes

- Coat of arms
- Location of Sains-lès-Pernes
- Location within France Location within Hauts-de-France
- Coordinates: 50°28′42″N 2°21′26″E
- Country: France
- Region: Hauts-de-France
- Department: Pas-de-Calais
- Arrondissement: Arras
- Canton: Saint-Pol-sur-Ternoise
- Intercommunality: CC Ternois

Government
  - Mayor (2023–2026): Pauline Boëte
- Area^{1}: 4.2 km^{2} (1.6 sq mi)
- Elevation: 165 m (541 ft)
- Highest elevation: 186 m (610 ft)
- Lowest elevation: 111 m (364 ft)
- Population (2023): 294
  - Density: 70/km^{2} (180/sq mi)
- Time zone: UTC+01:00 (CET)
  - Summer (DST): UTC+02:00 (CEST)
- INSEE/Postal code: 62740 /62550
- ^{1} French Land Register data, which excludes lakes, ponds, glaciers > 1 km^{2} (0.386 sq mi or 247 acres) and river estuaries.

Sains-lès-Pernes (French pronunciation: [sɛ̃ lɛ pɛʁn], literally Sains near Pernes) is a commune in the Pas-de-Calais department in the Hauts-de-France region of France about 27 miles (43 km) northwest of Arras, close to the town of Pernes. It is the source of the river Clarence, at a place known as "Le Buich".

== Population ==
Historical population
Year	Pop.	±% p.a.
1968	271	—
1975	262	−0.48%
1982	250	−0.67%
1990	221	−1.53%
1999	209	−0.62%
2007	251	+2.32%
2012	278	+2.06%
2017	292	+0.99%
2023	294	+0.11%
Source: INSEE

== See also ==
- Communes of the Pas-de-Calais department
