= Communauté d'agglomération de Béthune-Bruay, Artois-Lys Romane =

Coordinates: 50.53°N 2.64°E

Béthune-Bruay, Artois-Lys Romane
- Communauté d'agglomération
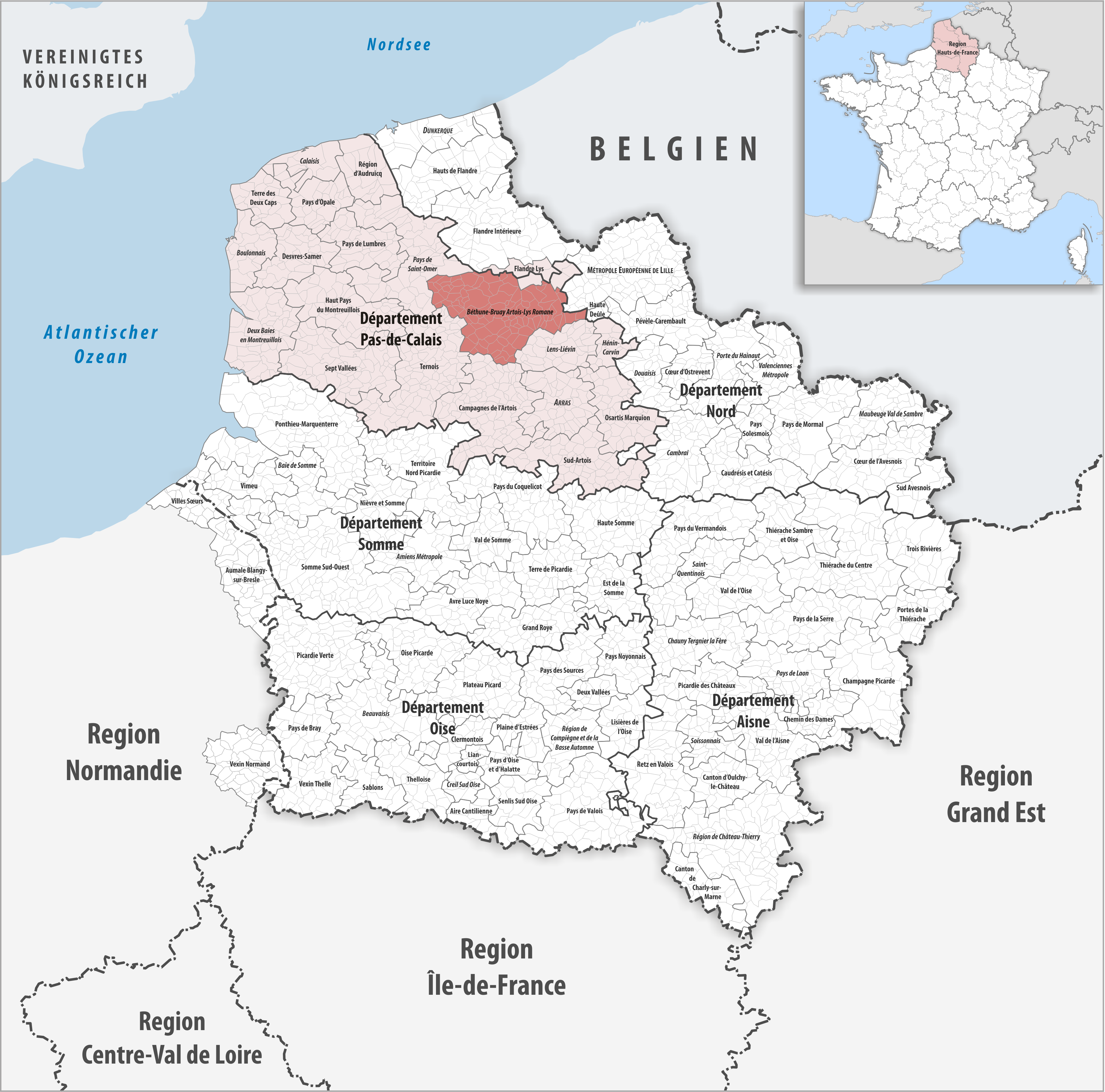
- Location of Béthune-Bruay, Artois-Lys Romane within the Hauts-de-France Region
- Country: France
- Region: Hauts-de-France
- Department: Pas-de-Calais
- No. of communes: {{{nbcomm}}}
- Established: 2017
- Area: 645.6 km^{2} (249.3 sq mi)
- Population (2018): 276,759
  - Density: 428.7/km^{2} (1,110/sq mi)
- Website: www.bethunebruay.fr

Communauté d'agglomération de Béthune-Bruay, Artois-Lys Romane is the communauté d'agglomération, an intercommunal structure, centred on the cities of Béthune and Bruay-la-Buissière. It is located in the Pas-de-Calais department, in the Hauts-de-France regions, northern France. It was created in January 2017 by the merger of the former communauté d'agglomération de Béthune Bruay Nœux et environs and the former communautés de communes Artois-Lys and Artois-Flandres. Its area is 645.6 km^{2}. Its population was 276,759 in 2018.

== Composition ==
The communauté d'agglomération consists of the following 100 communes:

1. Allouagne
2. Ames
3. Amettes
4. Annequin
5. Annezin
6. Auchel
7. Auchy-au-Bois
8. Auchy-les-Mines
9. Bajus
10. Barlin
11. Béthune
12. Beugin
13. Beuvry
14. Billy-Berclau
15. Blessy
16. Bourecq
17. Bruay-la-Buissière
18. Burbure
19. Busnes
20. Calonne-Ricouart
21. Calonne-sur-la-Lys
22. Camblain-Châtelain
23. Cambrin
24. Cauchy-à-la-Tour
25. Caucourt
26. Chocques
27. La Comté
28. La Couture
29. Cuinchy
30. Diéval
31. Divion
32. Douvrin
33. Drouvin-le-Marais
34. Ecquedecques
35. Essars
36. Estrée-Blanche
37. Estrée-Cauchy
38. Ferfay
39. Festubert
40. Fouquereuil
41. Fouquières-lès-Béthune
42. Fresnicourt-le-Dolmen
43. Gauchin-Légal
44. Givenchy-lès-la-Bassée
45. Gonnehem
46. Gosnay
47. Guarbecque
48. Haillicourt
49. Haisnes
50. Ham-en-Artois
51. Hermin
52. Hersin-Coupigny
53. Hesdigneul-lès-Béthune
54. Hinges
55. Houchin
56. Houdain
57. Isbergues
58. Labeuvrière
59. Labourse
60. Lambres-lez-Aire
61. Lapugnoy
62. Lespesses
63. Lières
64. Liettres
65. Ligny-lès-Aire
66. Lillers
67. Linghem
68. Locon
69. Lorgies
70. Lozinghem
71. Maisnil-lès-Ruitz
72. Marles-les-Mines
73. Mazinghem
74. Mont-Bernanchon
75. Neuve-Chapelle
76. Nœux-les-Mines
77. Norrent-Fontes
78. Noyelles-lès-Vermelles
79. Oblinghem
80. Ourton
81. Quernes
82. Rebreuve-Ranchicourt
83. Rely
84. Richebourg
85. Robecq
86. Rombly
87. Ruitz
88. Sailly-Labourse
89. Saint-Floris
90. Saint-Hilaire-Cottes
91. Saint-Venant
92. Vaudricourt
93. Vendin-lès-Béthune
94. Vermelles
95. Verquigneul
96. Verquin
97. Vieille-Chapelle
98. Violaines
99. Westrehem
100. Witternesse
