= Canton of Lillers =

Coordinates: 50°35′50″N 2°32′57″E

The Canton of Lillers is one of the 39 cantons of the Pas-de-Calais department, in northern France. At the French canton reorganisation which came into effect in March 2015, the canton was expanded from 9 to 22 communes:

- Allouagne
- Ames
- Amettes
- Auchy-au-Bois
- Bourecq
- Burbure
- Busnes
- Calonne-sur-la-Lys
- Ecquedecques
- Ferfay
- Gonnehem
- Ham-en-Artois
- Lespesses
- Lestrem
- Lières
- Lillers (chief town)
- Mont-Bernanchon
- Norrent-Fontes
- Robecq
- Saint-Floris
- Saint-Venant
- Westrehem
