= Maryan Synakowski =

French footballer (1936–2021)

Personal information
- Full name: Maryan Synakowski
- Date of birth: 14 March 1936
- Place of birth: Calonne-Ricouart, Pas-de-Calais, France
- Date of death: 25 January 2021 (aged 84)
- Place of death: Sedan, Ardennes, France
- Height: 1.75 m (5 ft 9 in)
- Position: Centre-back

Senior career*
Years	Team	Apps	(Gls)
1953–1954	Olympique Saint-Quentin		
1954–1955	Sedan-Torcy B		
1955–1963	Sedan-Torcy	241	(5)
1963–1965	Stade Français	36	(2)
1965–1967	Union Saint-Gilloise	51	(1)
1967–1969	Reims	43	(0)
1969–1971	Sedan	31	(0)
Total		402	(8)

International career
1961–1965	France	13	(0)
- * Club domestic league appearances and goals

Maryan Synakowski (14 March 1936 – 25 January 2021) was a French footballer who played as a centre-back.

== Early and personal life ==
Born in Calonne-Ricouart, Pas-de-Calais, Synakowski was of Polish descent. His grandson Bruno was also a footballer.

== Career ==
Synakowski played for Olympique Saint-Quentin, Sedan-Torcy B, Sedan-Torcy, Stade Français, Union Saint-Gilloise, Reims and Sedan. With Sedan-Torcy he won the 1961 Coupe de France Final.

He earned 13 caps for the France national team between 1961 and 1965. He declined a squad place at the 1966 FIFA World Cup.
