= Calonne-Ricouart =

- Commune
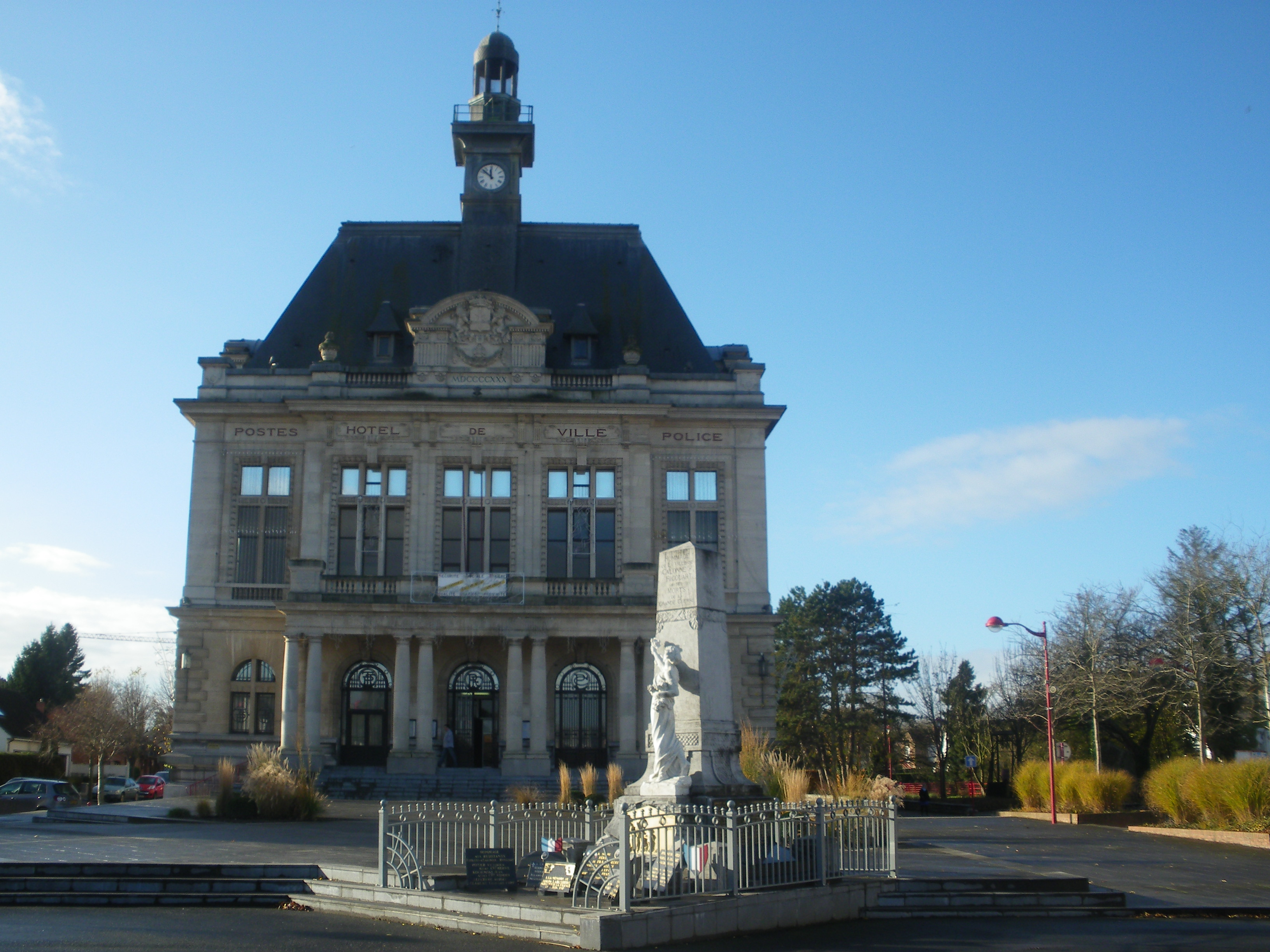
- The town hall of Calonne-Ricouart

- Coat of arms
- Location of Calonne-Ricouart
- Location within France Location within Hauts-de-France
- Coordinates: 50°29′15″N 2°29′04″E
- Country: France
- Region: Hauts-de-France
- Department: Pas-de-Calais
- Arrondissement: Béthune
- Canton: Auchel
- Intercommunality: CA Béthune-Bruay, Artois-Lys Romane

Government
  - Mayor (2020–2026): Ludovic Idziak
- Area^{1}: 4.61 km^{2} (1.78 sq mi)
- Elevation: 65 m (213 ft)
- Highest elevation: 114 m (374 ft)
- Lowest elevation: 41 m (135 ft)
- Population (2023): 5,369
  - Density: 1,160/km^{2} (3,020/sq mi)
- Time zone: UTC+01:00 (CET)
  - Summer (DST): UTC+02:00 (CEST)
- INSEE/Postal code: 62194 /62470
- ^{1} French Land Register data, which excludes lakes, ponds, glaciers > 1 km^{2} (0.386 sq mi or 247 acres) and river estuaries.

Calonne-Ricouart (French pronunciation: [kalɔn ʁikwaʁ]) is a commune in the Pas-de-Calais department in the Hauts-de-France region of France 6 miles (9.7 km) southwest of Béthune and 33 miles (53 km) southwest of Lille by the banks of the river Clarence.

== History ==
The village and the old castle were burned down in 1537 by the troops of Francis I.

== Population ==
Historical population
Year	Pop.	±% p.a.
1968	9,954	—
1975	8,534	−2.17%
1982	7,545	−1.74%
1990	6,585	−1.69%
1999	5,989	−1.05%
2007	5,815	−0.37%
2012	5,528	−1.01%
2017	5,454	−0.27%
2023	5,369	−0.26%
Source: INSEE

== Notable people ==
- Robert Budzynski (born 1940), football player
- Maryan Synakowski (1936–2022), football player
- Maryan Wisniewski (born 1937), football player

== See also ==
- Communes of the Pas-de-Calais department
