= Clarence (river) =

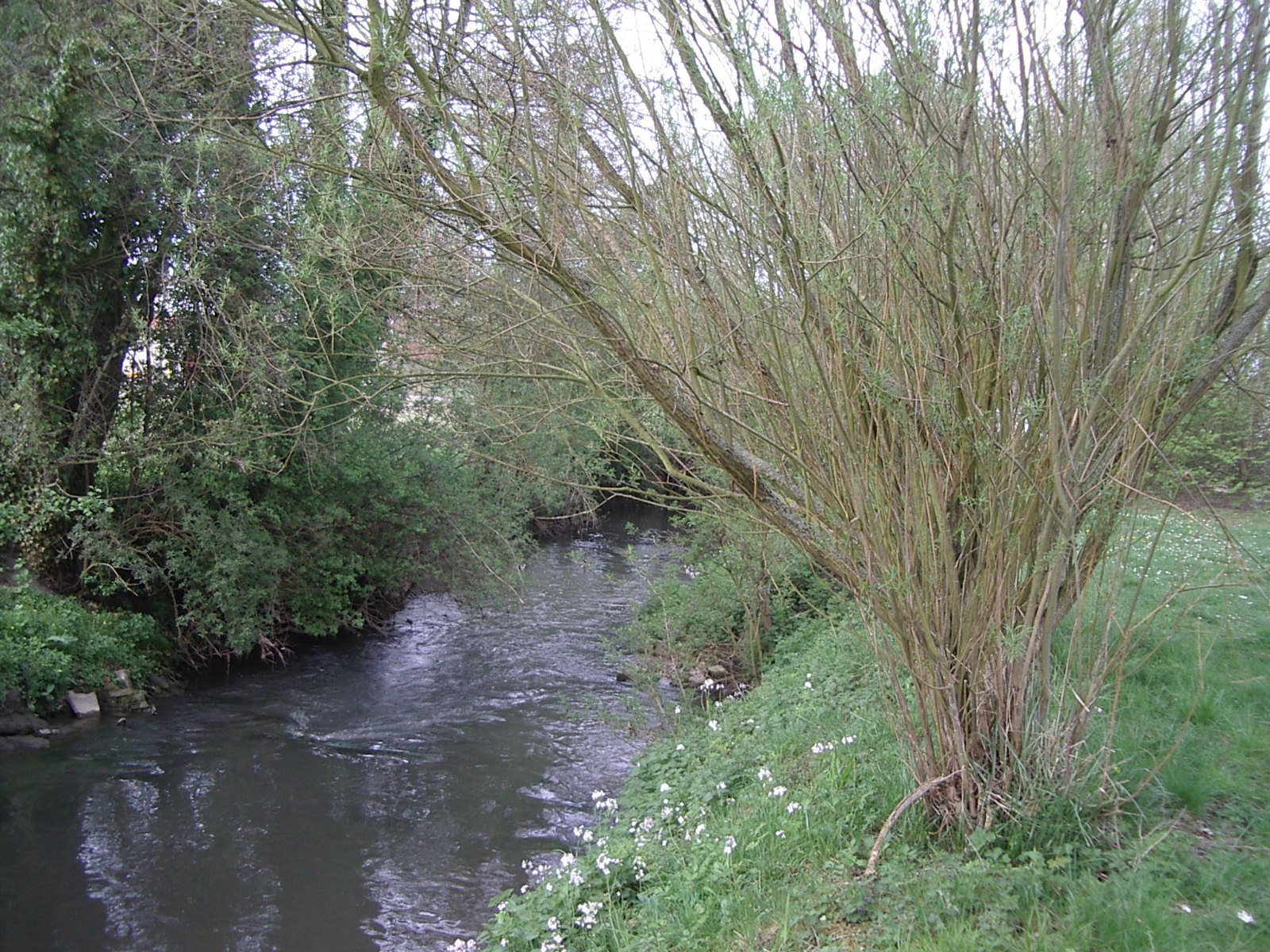
- The Clarence in Lapugnoy

- Location within France Location within Hauts-de-France

Location
- Country: France

Physical characteristics
- Source
  - location: Picardie
- Mouth
  - location: Lys
  - coordinates: 50°38′16″N 2°38′45″E
- Length: 33 km (21 mi)

Basin features
- Progression: Lys→ Scheldt→ North Sea

The Clarence is a river in northern France whose 33-kilometre (21 mi) course crosses the department of Pas-de-Calais.

Its source is near the village of Sains-lès-Pernes. It flows through the communes of Sachin, Pernes, Calonne-Ricouart, Calonne-sur-la-Lys and Gonnehem, finally joining the Lys near Merville.

It has two tributaries, the Nave and the Grand Nocq.
