= Sachin, Pas-de-Calais =

Sachin
- Commune
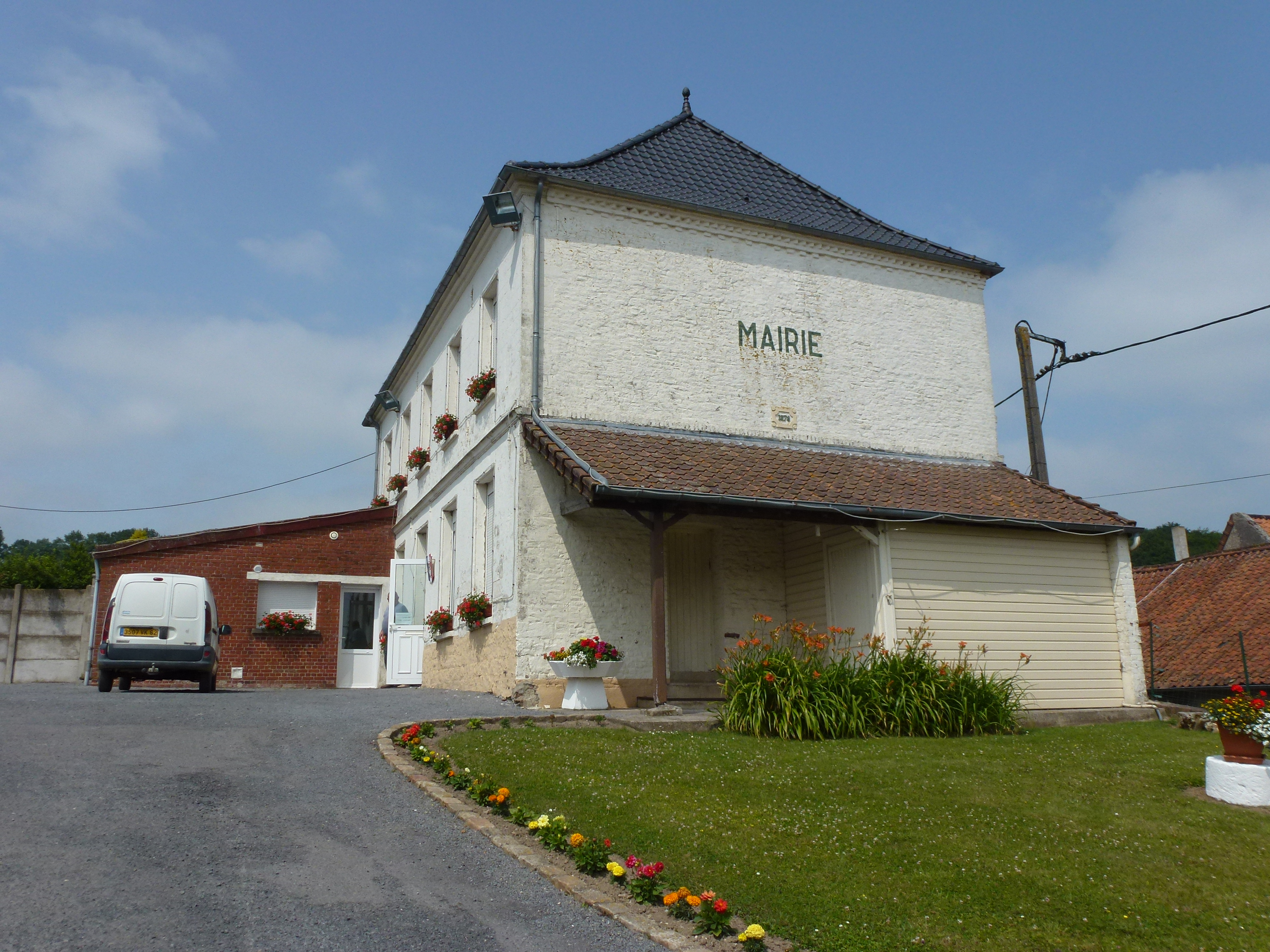
- The town hall of Sachin

- Coat of arms
- Location of Sachin
- Location within France Location within Hauts-de-France
- Coordinates: 50°29′15″N 2°22′35″E
- Country: France
- Region: Hauts-de-France
- Department: Pas-de-Calais
- Arrondissement: Arras
- Canton: Saint-Pol-sur-Ternoise
- Intercommunality: CC Ternois

Government
  - Mayor (2020–2026): Dominique Garot
- Area^{1}: 5.9 km^{2} (2.3 sq mi)
- Elevation: 108 m (354 ft)
- Highest elevation: 188 m (617 ft)
- Lowest elevation: 95 m (312 ft)
- Population (2023): 323
  - Density: 55/km^{2} (140/sq mi)
- Time zone: UTC+01:00 (CET)
  - Summer (DST): UTC+02:00 (CEST)
- INSEE/Postal code: 62732 /62550
- ^{1} French Land Register data, which excludes lakes, ponds, glaciers > 1 km^{2} (0.386 sq mi or 247 acres) and river estuaries.

Sachin (French pronunciation: [saʃɛ̃]) is a commune in the Pas-de-Calais department in the Hauts-de-France region of France in the valley of the river Clarence, about 26 miles (42 km) northwest of Arras.

== Population ==
Historical population
Year	Pop.	±% p.a.
1968	171	—
1975	138	−3.02%
1982	176	+3.54%
1990	240	+3.95%
1999	244	+0.18%
2007	247	+0.15%
2012	311	+4.72%
2017	345	+2.10%
2023	323	−1.09%
Source: INSEE

== See also ==
- Communes of the Pas-de-Calais department
