= Amettes =

- Commune
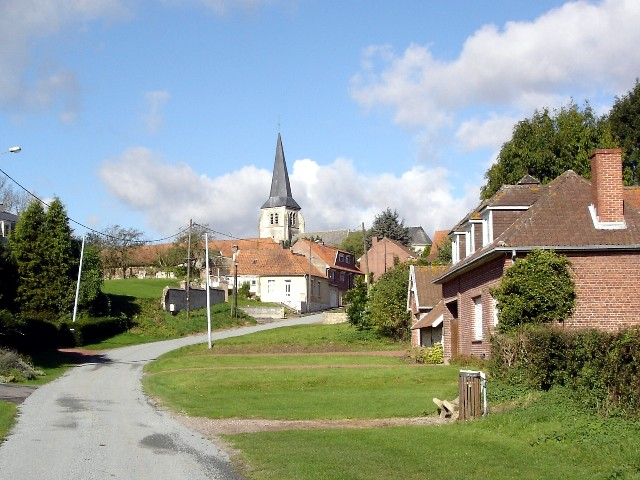
- The church of Amettes

- Coat of arms
- Location of Amettes
- Location within France Location within Hauts-de-France
- Coordinates: 50°31′53″N 2°23′36″E
- Country: France
- Region: Hauts-de-France
- Department: Pas-de-Calais
- Arrondissement: Béthune
- Canton: Lillers
- Intercommunality: CA Béthune-Bruay, Artois-Lys Romane

Government
  - Mayor (2020–2026): Michèle Delepine
- Area^{1}: 6.82 km^{2} (2.63 sq mi)
- Elevation: 86 m (282 ft)
- Highest elevation: 121 m (397 ft)
- Lowest elevation: 62 m (203 ft)
- Population (2023): 469
  - Density: 68.8/km^{2} (178/sq mi)
- Time zone: UTC+01:00 (CET)
  - Summer (DST): UTC+02:00 (CEST)
- INSEE/Postal code: 62029 /62260
- ^{1} French Land Register data, which excludes lakes, ponds, glaciers > 1 km^{2} (0.386 sq mi or 247 acres) and river estuaries.

Amettes (French pronunciation: [amɛt]) is a commune in the Pas-de-Calais department in the Hauts-de-France region of France.

== Geography ==
A farming village situated some 11 miles (18 km) west of Béthune and 32 miles (51 km) southwest of Lille, at the junction of the D69 and the D341 roads and by the banks of the river Nave.

== Population ==
Historical population
Year	Pop.	±% p.a.
1968	566	—
1975	507	−1.56%
1982	505	−0.06%
1990	507	+0.05%
1999	474	−0.75%
2007	502	+0.72%
2012	504	+0.08%
2017	475	−1.18%
2023	469	−0.21%
Source: INSEE

== Sights ==
- The church of St. Sulpice, dating from the sixteenth century.
- The war memorial.

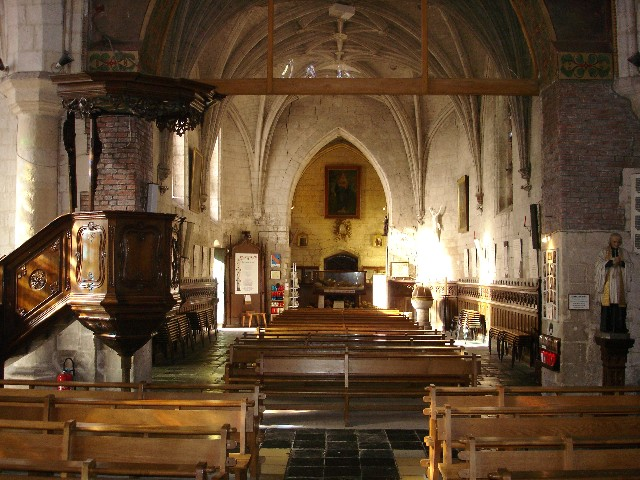
Church interior

== Personalities ==
Benedict Joseph Labre, Catholic saint, was born here in 1748.

== See also ==
- Communes of the Pas-de-Calais department
