= Robecq =

- Commune
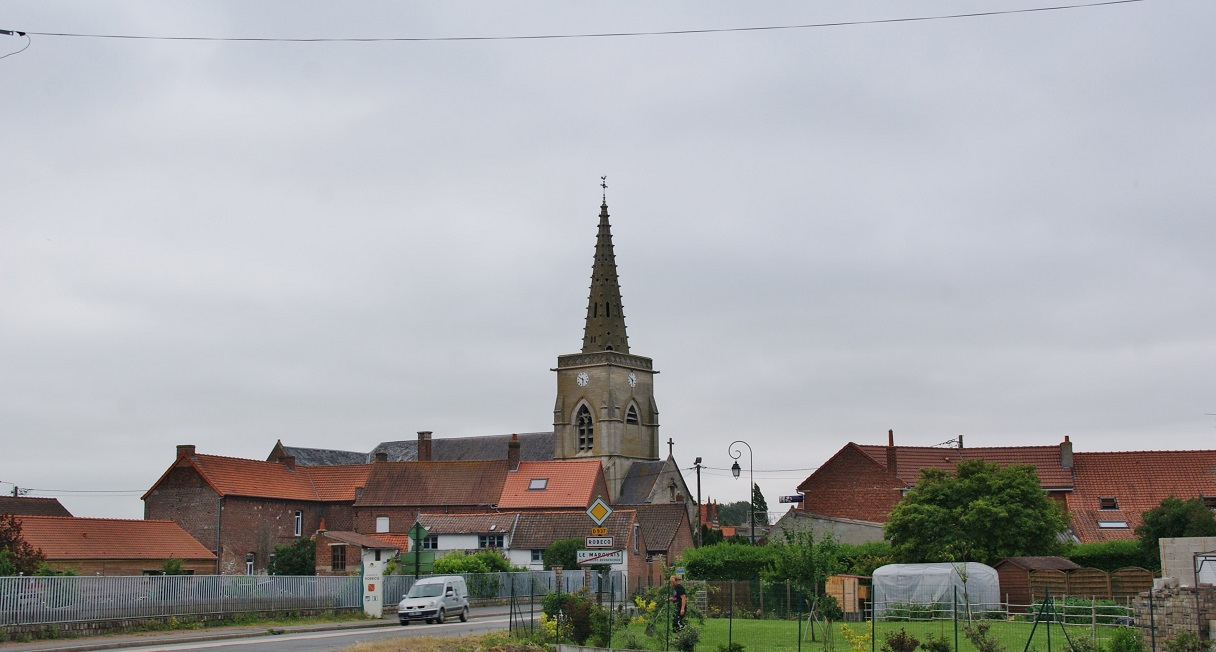
- The church of Robecq

- Coat of arms
- Location of Robecq
- Location within France Location within Hauts-de-France
- Coordinates: 50°35′48″N 2°33′51″E
- Country: France
- Region: Hauts-de-France
- Department: Pas-de-Calais
- Arrondissement: Béthune
- Canton: Lillers
- Intercommunality: CA Béthune-Bruay, Artois-Lys Romane

Government
  - Mayor (2020–2026): Hervé Deroubaix
- Area^{1}: 10.56 km^{2} (4.08 sq mi)
- Elevation: 19 m (62 ft)
- Highest elevation: 20 m (66 ft)
- Lowest elevation: 16 m (52 ft)
- Population (2023): 1,328
  - Density: 125.8/km^{2} (325.7/sq mi)
- Time zone: UTC+01:00 (CET)
  - Summer (DST): UTC+02:00 (CEST)
- INSEE/Postal code: 62713 /62350
- ^{1} French Land Register data, which excludes lakes, ponds, glaciers > 1 km^{2} (0.386 sq mi or 247 acres) and river estuaries.

Robecq (French pronunciation: [ʁɔbɛk]; Dutch: Robeke) is a commune in the Pas-de-Calais department in the Hauts-de-France region of France about 7 miles (11 km) northwest of Béthune and 31 miles (50 km) southwest of Lille. The Canal d'Aire and the rivers Clarence and Busnes all flow through the commune.

== Population ==
Historical population
Year	Pop.	±% p.a.
1968	1,109	—
1975	1,006	−1.38%
1982	1,037	+0.43%
1990	1,063	+0.31%
1999	1,062	−0.01%
2007	1,195	+1.49%
2012	1,322	+2.04%
2017	1,359	+0.55%
2023	1,328	−0.38%
Source: INSEE

== See also ==
- Lords of Robecque
- Communes of the Pas-de-Calais department
