= Lières =

Lières Lier
- Commune
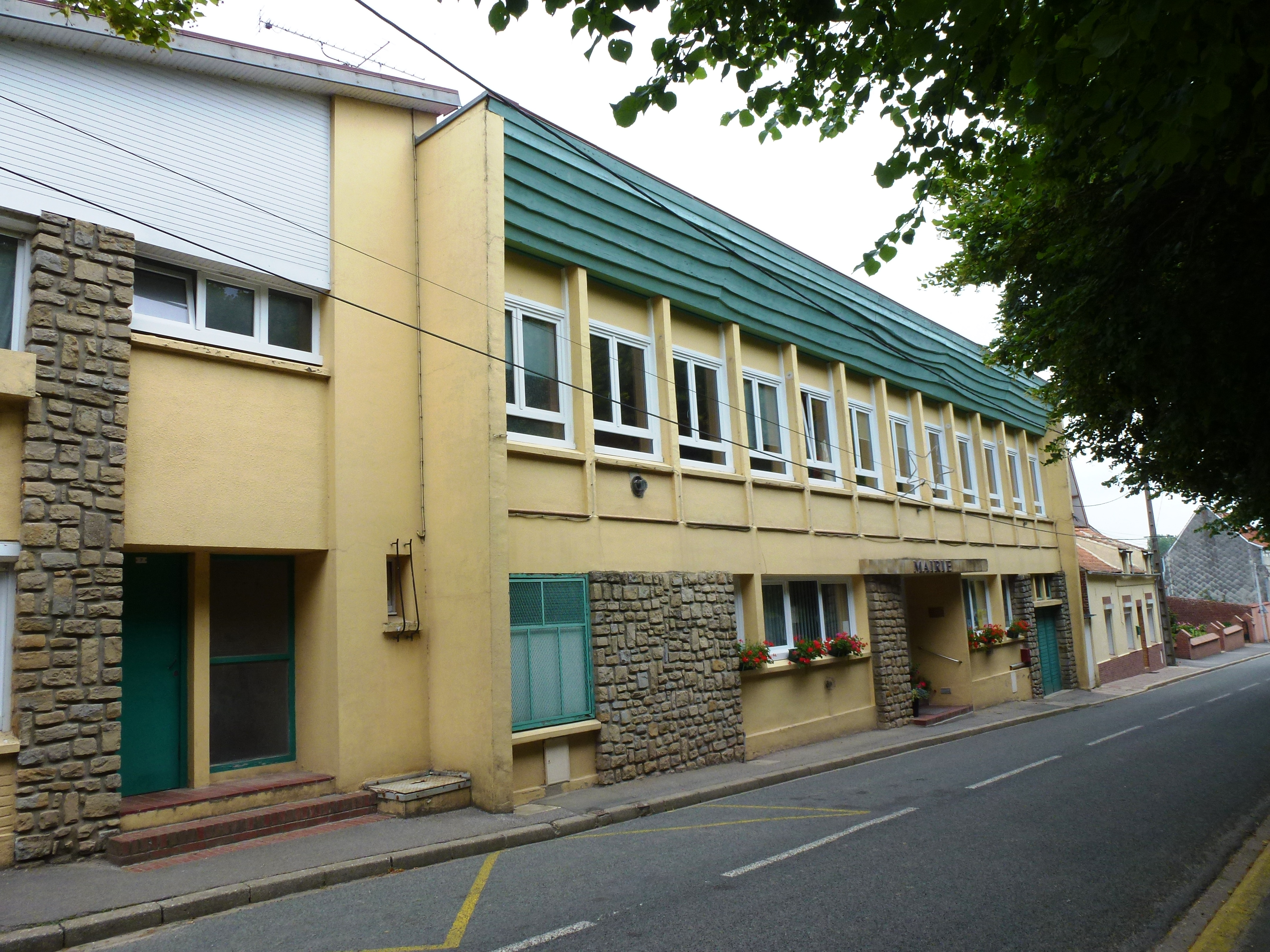
- The town hall of Lières

- Coat of arms
- Location of Lières
- Location within France Location within Hauts-de-France
- Coordinates: 50°33′16″N 2°25′09″E
- Country: France
- Region: Hauts-de-France
- Department: Pas-de-Calais
- Arrondissement: Béthune
- Canton: Lillers
- Intercommunality: CA Béthune-Bruay, Artois-Lys Romane

Government
  - Mayor (2021–2026): Didier Cretel
- Area^{1}: 3.24 km^{2} (1.25 sq mi)
- Elevation: 85 m (279 ft)
- Highest elevation: 93 m (305 ft)
- Lowest elevation: 41 m (135 ft)
- Population (2023): 335
  - Density: 103/km^{2} (268/sq mi)
- Time zone: UTC+01:00 (CET)
  - Summer (DST): UTC+02:00 (CEST)
- INSEE/Postal code: 62508 /62190
- ^{1} French Land Register data, which excludes lakes, ponds, glaciers > 1 km^{2} (0.386 sq mi or 247 acres) and river estuaries.

Lières (French pronunciation: [ljɛʁ]; West Flemish: Lier) is a commune in the Pas-de-Calais department in the Hauts-de-France region of France about 10 miles (16 km) northwest of Béthune and 33 miles (53 km) west of Lille, by the banks of the river Nave.

== Population ==
Historical population
Year	Pop.	±% p.a.
1968	537	—
1975	443	−2.71%
1982	351	−3.27%
1990	299	−1.98%
1999	279	−0.77%
2007	359	+3.20%
2012	378	+1.04%
2017	380	+0.11%
2023	335	−2.08%
Source: INSEE

== See also ==
- Communes of the Pas-de-Calais department
