= Lespesses =

- Commune
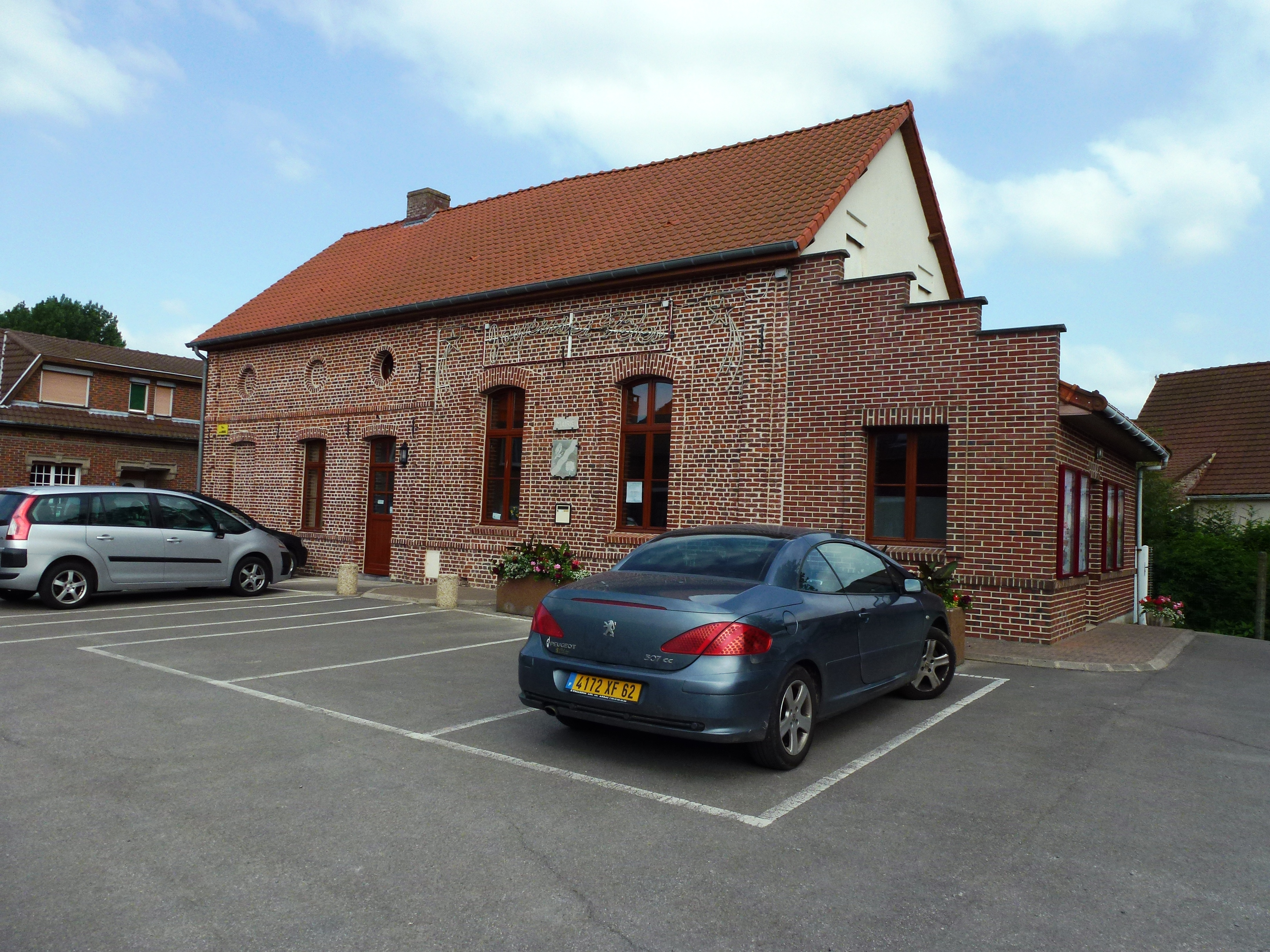
- The town hall of Lespesses

- Coat of arms
- Location of Lespesses
- Location within France Location within Hauts-de-France
- Coordinates: 50°33′48″N 2°25′30″E
- Country: France
- Region: Hauts-de-France
- Department: Pas-de-Calais
- Arrondissement: Béthune
- Canton: Lillers
- Intercommunality: CA Béthune-Bruay, Artois-Lys Romane

Government
  - Mayor (2020–2026): Arnaud Picque
- Area^{1}: 3.09 km^{2} (1.19 sq mi)
- Elevation: 40 m (130 ft)
- Highest elevation: 84 m (276 ft)
- Lowest elevation: 33 m (108 ft)
- Population (2023): 402
  - Density: 130/km^{2} (337/sq mi)
- Time zone: UTC+01:00 (CET)
  - Summer (DST): UTC+02:00 (CEST)
- INSEE/Postal code: 62500 /62190
- ^{1} French Land Register data, which excludes lakes, ponds, glaciers > 1 km^{2} (0.386 sq mi or 247 acres) and river estuaries.

Lespesses (French pronunciation: [lɛspɛs]) is a commune in the Pas-de-Calais department in the Hauts-de-France region of France.

== Geography ==
A small farming village, situated some 10 miles (16 km) northwest of Béthune and 33 miles (53 km) west of Lille, on the D185 and D185e1, by the banks of the river Nave. The commune is separated into two parts by the A26 autoroute.

== Population ==
Historical population
Year	Pop.	±% p.a.
1968	381	—
1975	337	−1.74%
1982	340	+0.13%
1990	415	+2.52%
1999	401	−0.38%
2007	419	+0.55%
2012	407	−0.58%
2017	405	−0.10%
2023	402	−0.12%
Source: INSEE

== Places of interest ==
- The church of St. Martin, dating from the sixteenth century.

== See also ==
- Communes of the Pas-de-Calais department
