= Ames, Pas-de-Calais =

Ames
- Commune
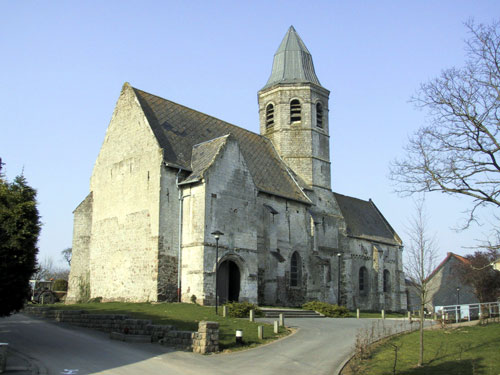
- The church of Ames

- Coat of arms
- Location of Ames
- Location within France Location within Hauts-de-France
- Coordinates: 50°32′33″N 2°24′58″E
- Country: France
- Region: Hauts-de-France
- Department: Pas-de-Calais
- Arrondissement: Béthune
- Canton: Lillers
- Intercommunality: CA Béthune-Bruay, Artois-Lys Romane

Government
  - Mayor (2020–2026): Marcel Cocq
- Area^{1}: 3.5 km^{2} (1.4 sq mi)
- Elevation: 53 m (174 ft)
- Highest elevation: 99 m (325 ft)
- Lowest elevation: 52 m (171 ft)
- Population (2023): 676
  - Density: 190/km^{2} (500/sq mi)
- Time zone: UTC+01:00 (CET)
  - Summer (DST): UTC+02:00 (CEST)
- INSEE/Postal code: 62028 /62190
- ^{1} French Land Register data, which excludes lakes, ponds, glaciers > 1 km^{2} (0.386 sq mi or 247 acres) and river estuaries.

Ames (French pronunciation: [am]) is a commune in the Pas-de-Calais department in the Hauts-de-France region of France about 11 miles (18 km) west of Béthune and 31 miles (50 km) southwest of Lille, by the banks of the river Nave.

== Population ==
Historical population
Year	Pop.	±% p.a.
1968	639	—
1975	611	−0.64%
1982	601	−0.24%
1990	555	−0.99%
1999	518	−0.76%
2007	569	+1.18%
2012	653	+2.79%
2017	636	−0.53%
2023	676	+1.02%
Source: INSEE

== See also ==
- Communes of the Pas-de-Calais department
