= Nédonchel =

- Commune
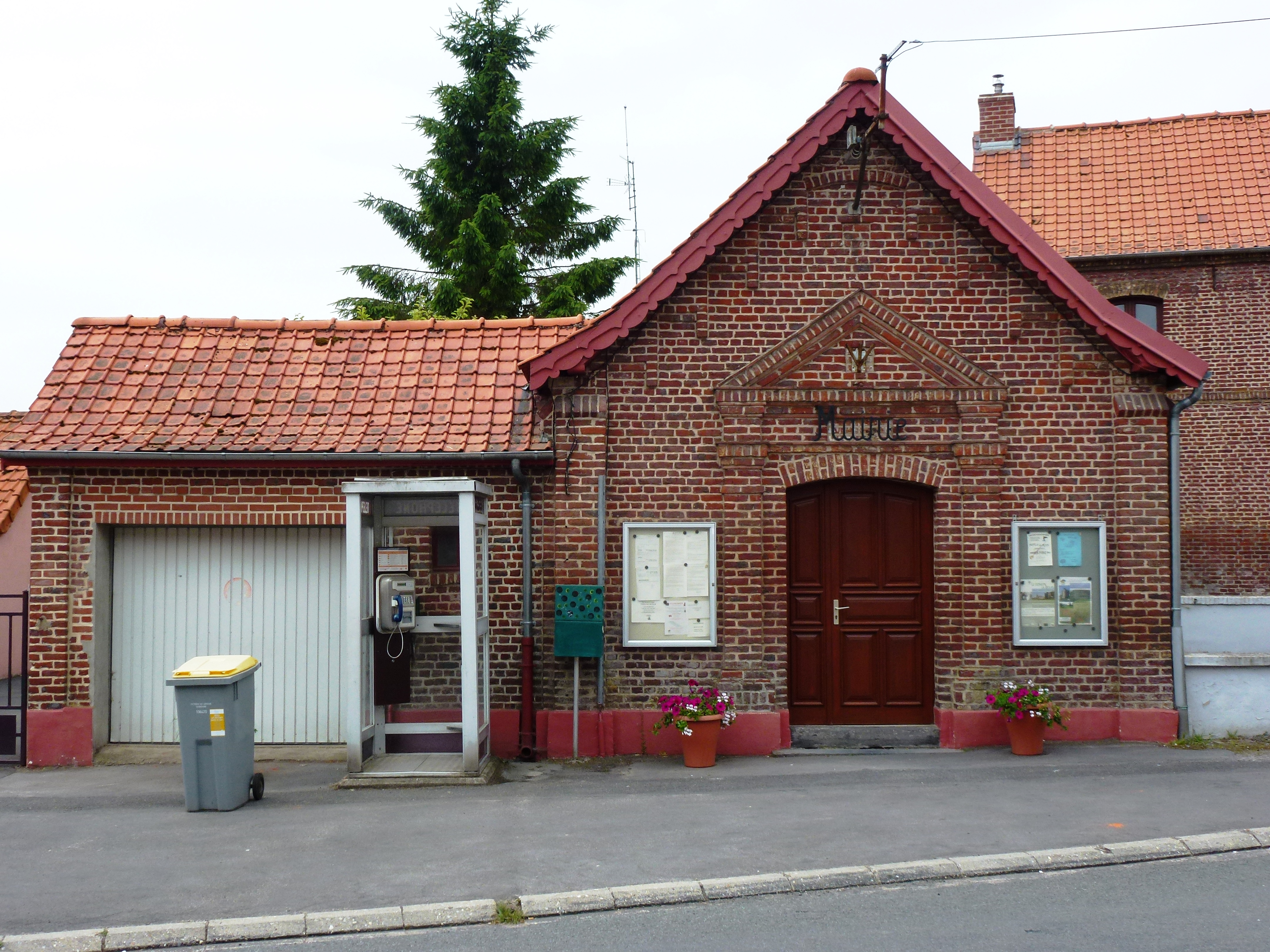
- The town hall of Nédonchel

- Coat of arms
- Location of Nédonchel
- Location within France Location within Hauts-de-France
- Coordinates: 50°31′30″N 2°21′33″E
- Country: France
- Region: Hauts-de-France
- Department: Pas-de-Calais
- Arrondissement: Arras
- Canton: Saint-Pol-sur-Ternoise
- Intercommunality: CC Ternois

Government
  - Mayor (2020–2026): Frédéric Diaz
- Area^{1}: 3.89 km^{2} (1.50 sq mi)
- Elevation: 110 m (360 ft)
- Highest elevation: 182 m (597 ft)
- Lowest elevation: 82 m (269 ft)
- Population (2023): 357
  - Density: 91.8/km^{2} (238/sq mi)
- Time zone: UTC+01:00 (CET)
  - Summer (DST): UTC+02:00 (CEST)
- INSEE/Postal code: 62601 /62550
- ^{1} French Land Register data, which excludes lakes, ponds, glaciers > 1 km^{2} (0.386 sq mi or 247 acres) and river estuaries.

Nédonchel (French pronunciation: [nedɔ̃ʃɛl]) is a commune in the Pas-de-Calais department in the Hauts-de-France region of France.

== Geography ==
Nédonchel is situated 28 miles (45 km) northwest of Arras, at the junction of the D69 and D90 roads, in the valley of the river Nave.

== Population ==
Historical population
Year	Pop.	±% p.a.
1968	324	—
1975	291	−1.52%
1982	239	−2.77%
1990	228	−0.59%
1999	210	−0.91%
2007	240	+1.68%
2012	242	+0.17%
2017	282	+3.11%
2023	357	+4.01%
Source: INSEE

== Places of interest ==
- The church of St.Menne, dating from the fifteenth century.

== See also ==
- Communes of the Pas-de-Calais department
