= Pernes, Pas-de-Calais =

Pernes
- Commune
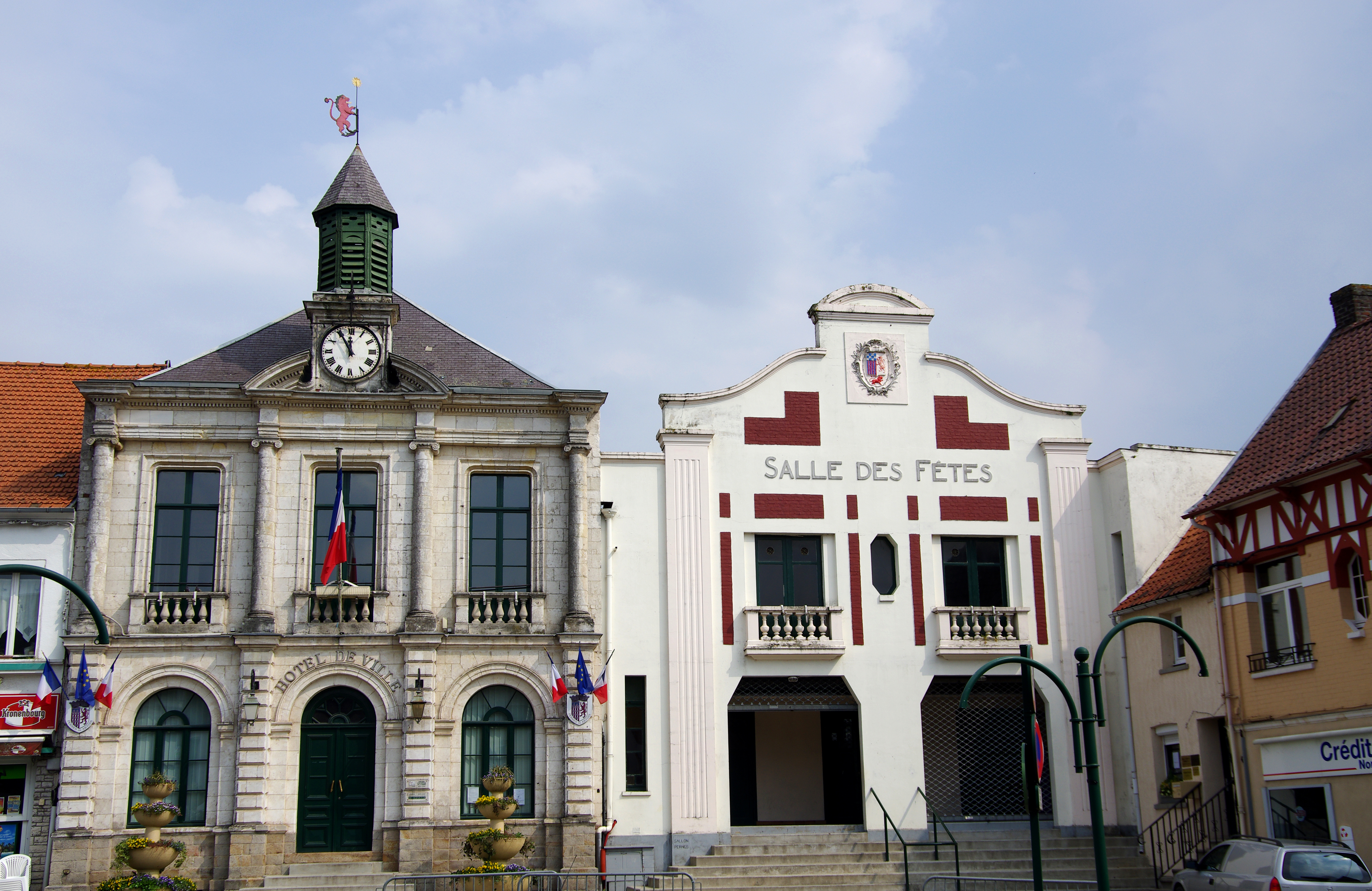
- The town hall and festival hall of Pernes
- Location of Pernes
- Location within France Location within Hauts-de-France
- Coordinates: 50°29′06″N 2°24′41″E
- Country: France
- Region: Hauts-de-France
- Department: Pas-de-Calais
- Arrondissement: Arras
- Canton: Saint-Pol-sur-Ternoise
- Intercommunality: CC Ternois

Government
  - Mayor (2020–2026): Geneviève Janssoone Czajka
- Area^{1}: 4.58 km^{2} (1.77 sq mi)
- Elevation: 83 m (272 ft)
- Highest elevation: 182 m (597 ft)
- Lowest elevation: 70 m (230 ft)
- Population (2023): 1,574
  - Density: 344/km^{2} (890/sq mi)
- Time zone: UTC+01:00 (CET)
  - Summer (DST): UTC+02:00 (CEST)
- INSEE/Postal code: 62652 /62550
- ^{1} French Land Register data, which excludes lakes, ponds, glaciers > 1 km^{2} (0.386 sq mi or 247 acres) and river estuaries.

Pernes (French pronunciation: [pɛʁn]; or Pernes-en-Artois) is a commune in the Pas-de-Calais department in the Hauts-de-France region of France between Saint-Pol-sur-Ternoise and Lillers. It is crossed by the river Clarence.

== Population ==
Historical population
| Year | Pop. | ±% p.a. |
|---|---|---|
| 1968 | 1,696 | — |
| 1975 | 1,653 | −0.37% |
| 1982 | 1,516 | −1.23% |
| 1990 | 1,536 | +0.16% |
| 1999 | 1,628 | +0.65% |
| 2007 | 1,655 | +0.21% |
| 2012 | 1,627 | −0.34% |
| 2017 | 1,686 | +0.71% |
| 2023 | 1,574 | −1.14% |
Source: INSEE

== See also ==
- Communes of the Pas-de-Calais department
