= Ferfay =

- Commune
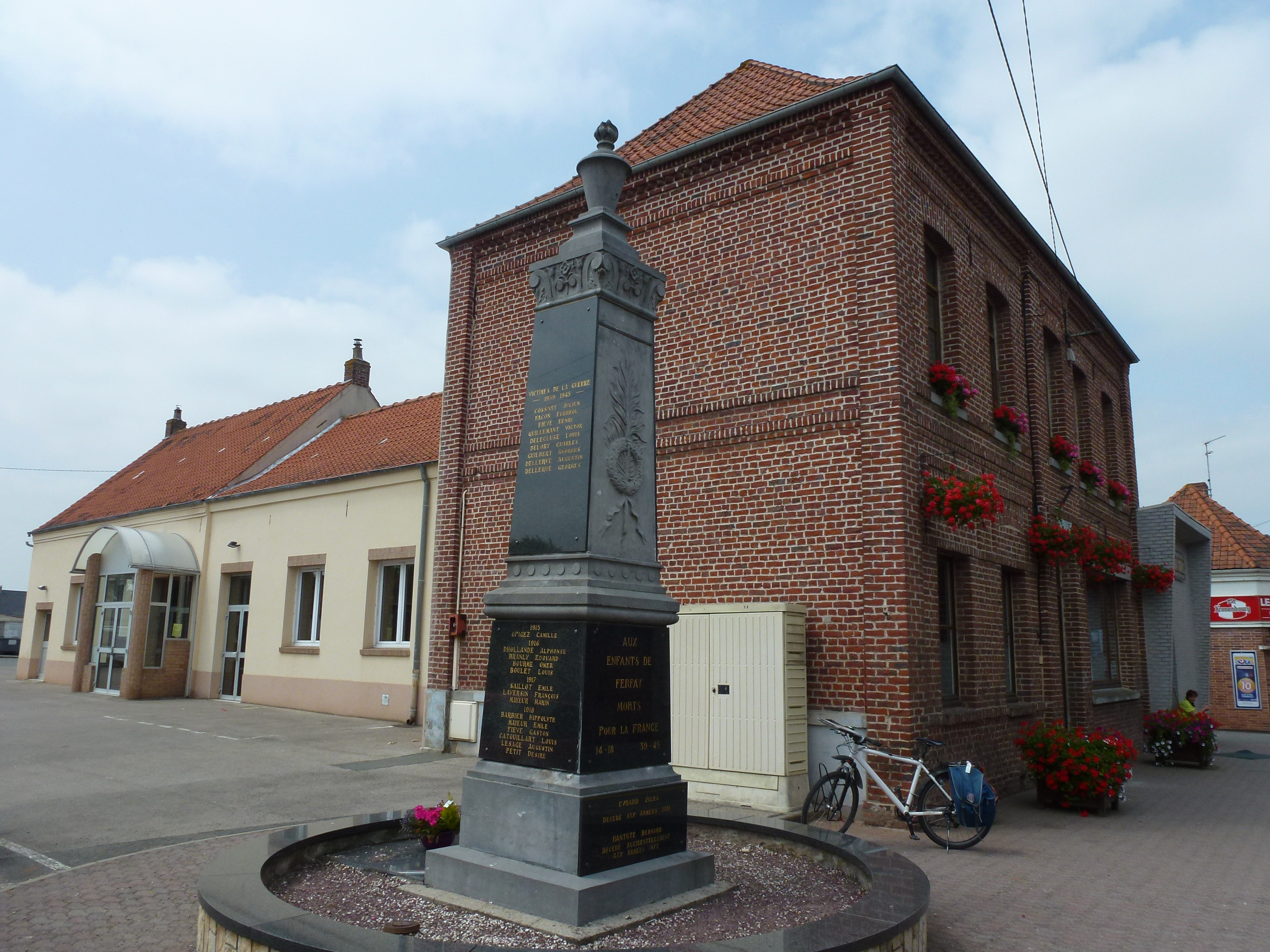
- The town hall and monument to the dead, in Ferfay

- Coat of arms
- Location of Ferfay
- Location within France Location within Hauts-de-France
- Coordinates: 50°31′08″N 2°25′31″E
- Country: France
- Region: Hauts-de-France
- Department: Pas-de-Calais
- Arrondissement: Béthune
- Canton: Lillers
- Intercommunality: CA Béthune-Bruay, Artois-Lys Romane

Government
  - Mayor (2020–2026): Line Garot
- Area^{1}: 3.89 km^{2} (1.50 sq mi)
- Elevation: 106 m (348 ft)
- Highest elevation: 112 m (367 ft)
- Lowest elevation: 65 m (213 ft)
- Population (2023): 861
  - Density: 221/km^{2} (573/sq mi)
- Time zone: UTC+01:00 (CET)
  - Summer (DST): UTC+02:00 (CEST)
- INSEE/Postal code: 62328 /62260
- ^{1} French Land Register data, which excludes lakes, ponds, glaciers > 1 km^{2} (0.386 sq mi or 247 acres) and river estuaries.

Ferfay (French pronunciation: [fɛʁfaj]) is a commune in the Pas-de-Calais department in the Hauts-de-France region of France.

== Geography ==
A former coalmining and now a farming village some 10 miles (16 km) west of Béthune and 31 miles (50 km) southwest of Lille, at the junction of the D341 and the D91 roads.

== Population ==
Historical population
Year	Pop.	±% p.a.
1968	1,015	—
1975	910	−1.55%
1982	888	−0.35%
1990	920	+0.44%
1999	880	−0.49%
2007	954	+1.01%
2012	931	−0.49%
2017	912	−0.41%
2023	861	−0.95%
Source: INSEE

== Places of interest ==
- The church of St.Lugle-et-Saint-Luglien, dating from the nineteenth century.
- The ruins of a chateau destroyed in 1944.

== See also ==
- Communes of the Pas-de-Calais department
