= Ham-en-Artois =

- Commune
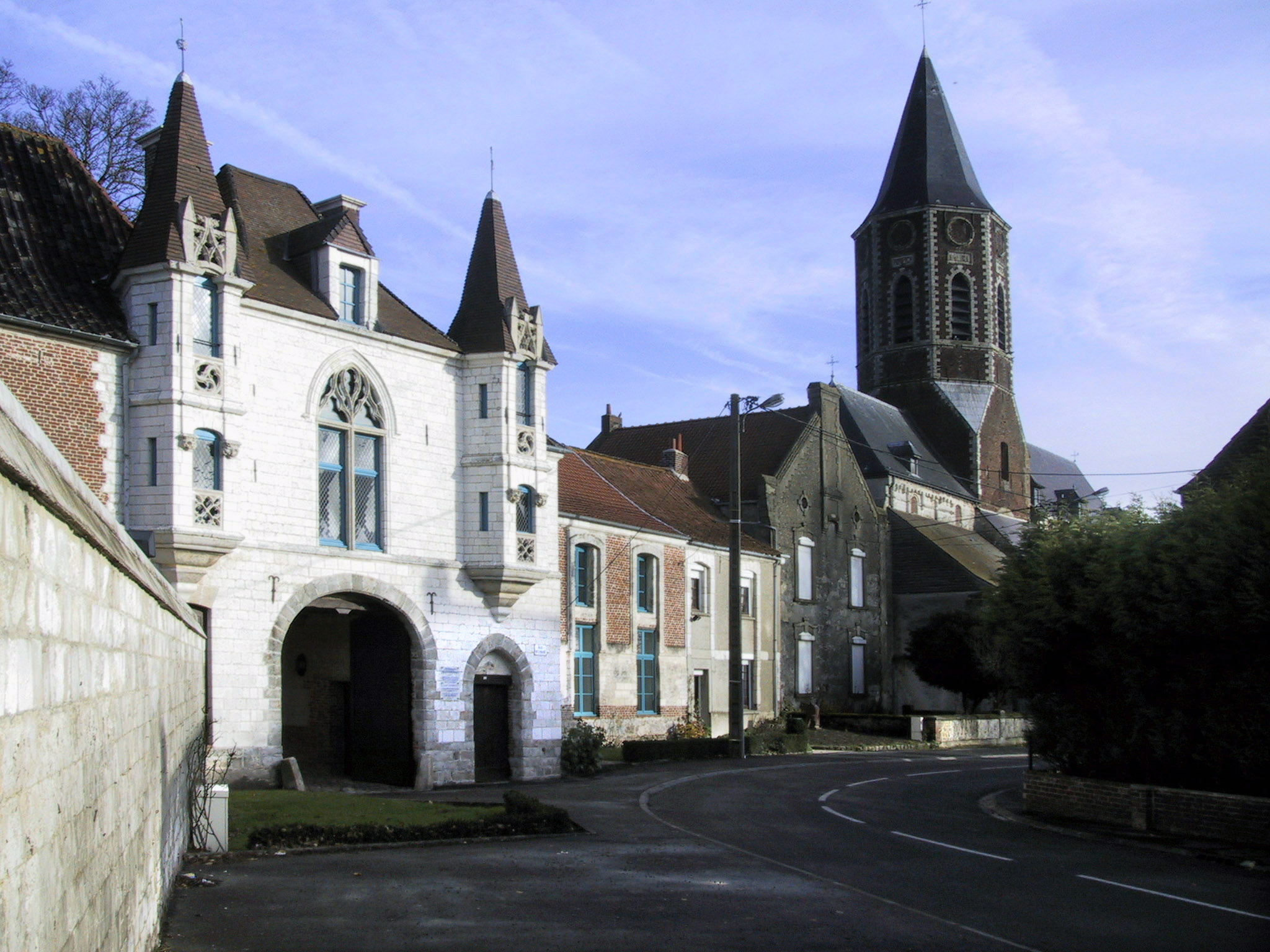
- Abbey gateway and church

- Coat of arms
- Location of Ham-en-Artois
- Location within France Location within Hauts-de-France
- Coordinates: 50°35′23″N 2°27′32″E
- Country: France
- Region: Hauts-de-France
- Department: Pas-de-Calais
- Arrondissement: Béthune
- Canton: Lillers
- Intercommunality: CA Béthune-Bruay, Artois-Lys Romane

Government
  - Mayor (2020–2026): Pierre Selin
- Area^{1}: 3.2 km^{2} (1.2 sq mi)
- Elevation: 23 m (75 ft)
- Highest elevation: 33 m (108 ft)
- Lowest elevation: 19 m (62 ft)
- Population (2023): 944
  - Density: 300/km^{2} (760/sq mi)
- Time zone: UTC+01:00 (CET)
  - Summer (DST): UTC+02:00 (CEST)
- INSEE/Postal code: 62407 /62190
- ^{1} French Land Register data, which excludes lakes, ponds, glaciers > 1 km^{2} (0.386 sq mi or 247 acres) and river estuaries.

Ham-en-Artois (French pronunciation: [am ɑ̃.n‿aʁtwa], lit. 'Ham in Artois'; Picard: Han-in-Artoé) is a commune in the Pas-de-Calais department in the Hauts-de-France region of France about 9 miles (14 km) northwest of Béthune and 28 miles (45 km) west of Lille.

== Population ==
Historical population
Year	Pop.	±% p.a.
1968	863	—
1975	890	+0.44%
1982	1,005	+1.75%
1990	1,032	+0.33%
1999	989	−0.47%
2007	981	−0.10%
2012	1,015	+0.68%
2017	992	−0.46%
2023	944	−0.82%
Source: INSEE

== See also ==
- Communes of the Pas-de-Calais department
