= Auchy-au-Bois =

- Commune
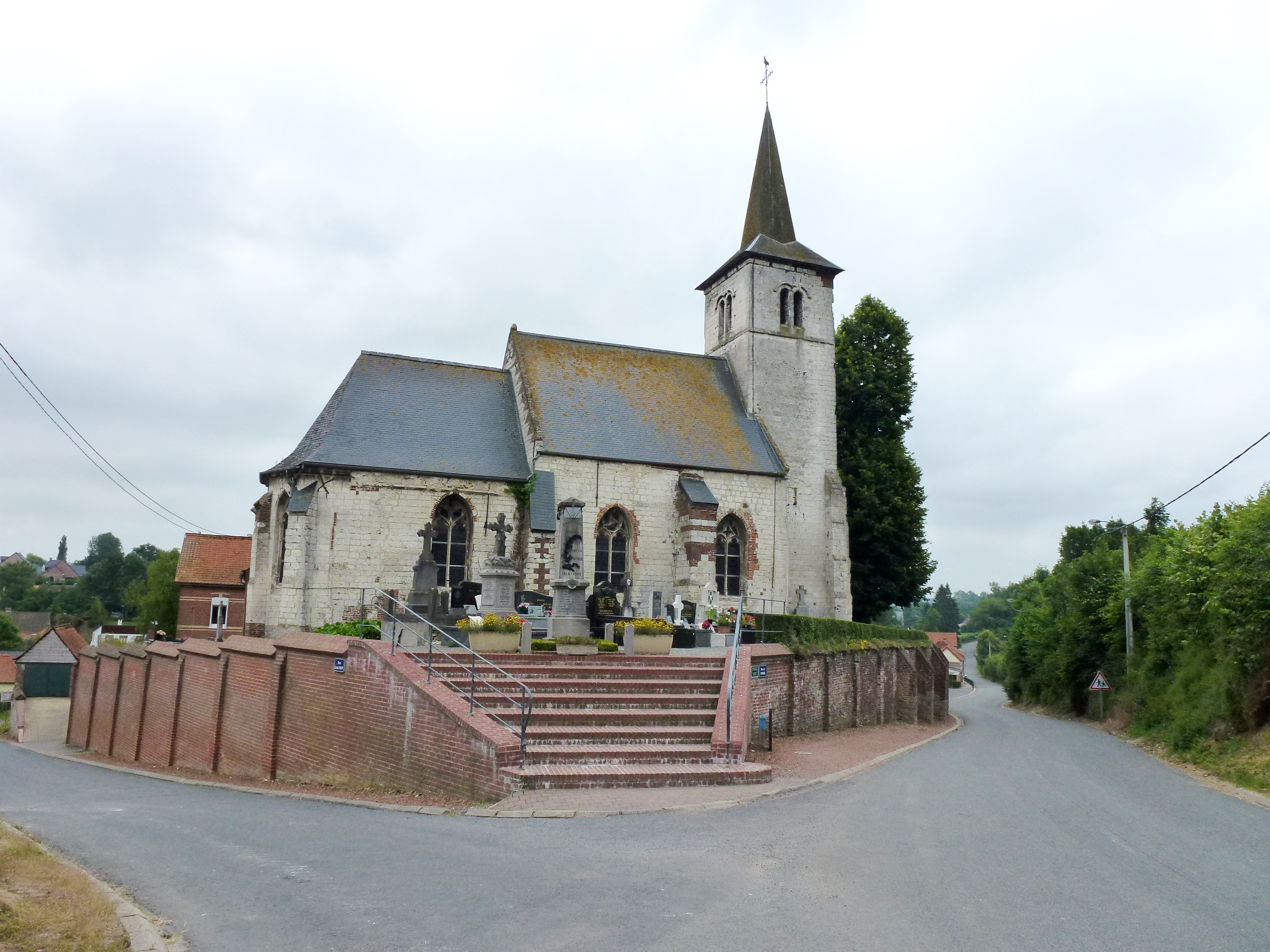
- The church of Auchy-au-Bois

- Coat of arms
- Location of Auchy-au-Bois
- Location within France Location within Hauts-de-France
- Coordinates: 50°33′19″N 2°22′19″E
- Country: France
- Region: Hauts-de-France
- Department: Pas-de-Calais
- Arrondissement: Béthune
- Canton: Lillers
- Intercommunality: CA Béthune-Bruay, Artois-Lys Romane

Government
  - Mayor (2020–2026): Jean-François Delplace
- Area^{1}: 4.27 km^{2} (1.65 sq mi)
- Elevation: 89 m (292 ft)
- Highest elevation: 110 m (360 ft)
- Lowest elevation: 61 m (200 ft)
- Population (2023): 548
  - Density: 128/km^{2} (332/sq mi)
- Time zone: UTC+01:00 (CET)
  - Summer (DST): UTC+02:00 (CEST)
- INSEE/Postal code: 62049 /62190
- ^{1} French Land Register data, which excludes lakes, ponds, glaciers > 1 km^{2} (0.386 sq mi or 247 acres) and river estuaries.

Auchy-au-Bois (French pronunciation: [oʃi o bwa]) is a commune in the Pas-de-Calais department in a Hauts-de-France region of France.

== Geography ==
A farming village situated 11 miles (18 km) west of Béthune and 33 miles (53 km) west of Lille, at the junction of the D94 and the D341 roads.

== Population ==
Historical population
Year	Pop.	±% p.a.
1968	504	—
1975	481	−0.67%
1982	424	−1.79%
1990	387	−1.13%
1999	414	+0.75%
2007	433	+0.56%
2012	471	+1.70%
2017	504	+1.36%
2023	548	+1.40%
Source: INSEE

== Sights ==
- The church of St. Gilles, dating from the seventeenth century.
- The old towers of the Château de Fromental, now farm buildings.

== See also ==
- Communes of the Pas-de-Calais department
