= Busnes =

Busnes Bune
- Commune
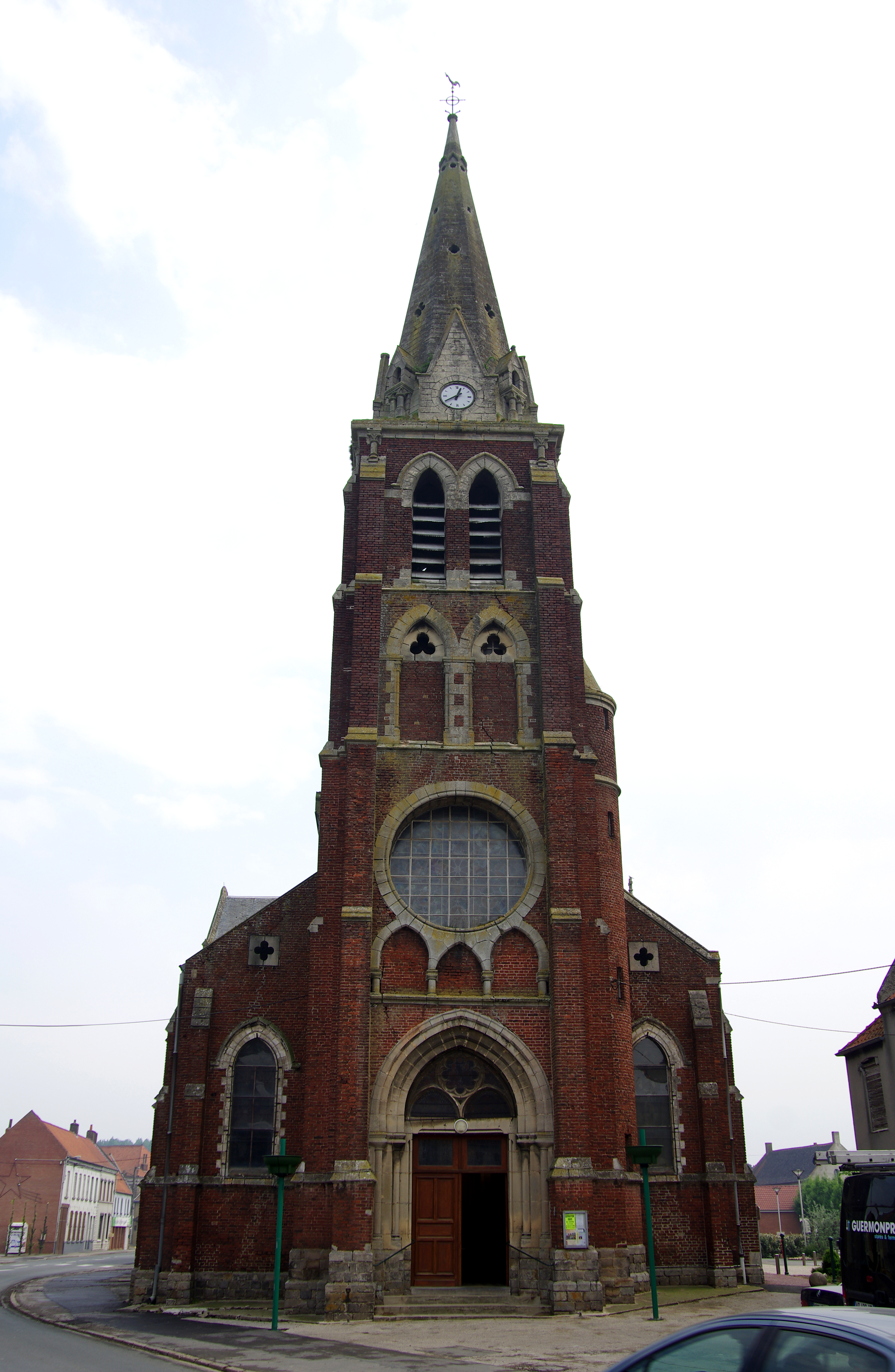
- The church of Busnes

- Coat of arms
- Location of Busnes
- Location within France Location within Hauts-de-France
- Coordinates: 50°35′19″N 2°31′09″E
- Country: France
- Region: Hauts-de-France
- Department: Pas-de-Calais
- Arrondissement: Béthune
- Canton: Lillers
- Intercommunality: CA Béthune-Bruay, Artois-Lys Romane

Government
  - Mayor (2020–2026): Franck Hannebicq
- Area^{1}: 9.55 km^{2} (3.69 sq mi)
- Elevation: 19 m (62 ft)
- Highest elevation: 20 m (66 ft)
- Lowest elevation: 17 m (56 ft)
- Population (2023): 1,243
  - Density: 130/km^{2} (337/sq mi)
- Time zone: UTC+01:00 (CET)
  - Summer (DST): UTC+02:00 (CEST)
- INSEE/Postal code: 62190 /62350
- ^{1} French Land Register data, which excludes lakes, ponds, glaciers > 1 km^{2} (0.386 sq mi or 247 acres) and river estuaries.

Busnes (French pronunciation: [byn]; West Flemish: Bune) is a commune in the Pas-de-Calais department in the northern Hauts-de-France region of France about 8 miles (13 km) northwest of Béthune and 23 miles (37 km) west of Lille.

== Population ==
Historical population
Year	Pop.	±% p.a.
1968	1,106	—
1975	1,178	+0.91%
1982	1,266	+1.03%
1990	1,337	+0.68%
1999	1,294	−0.36%
2007	1,248	−0.45%
2012	1,253	+0.08%
2017	1,290	+0.58%
2023	1,243	−0.62%
Source: INSEE

== See also ==
- Communes of the Pas-de-Calais department
