= Norrent-Fontes =

Norrent-Fontes Norrem
- Commune
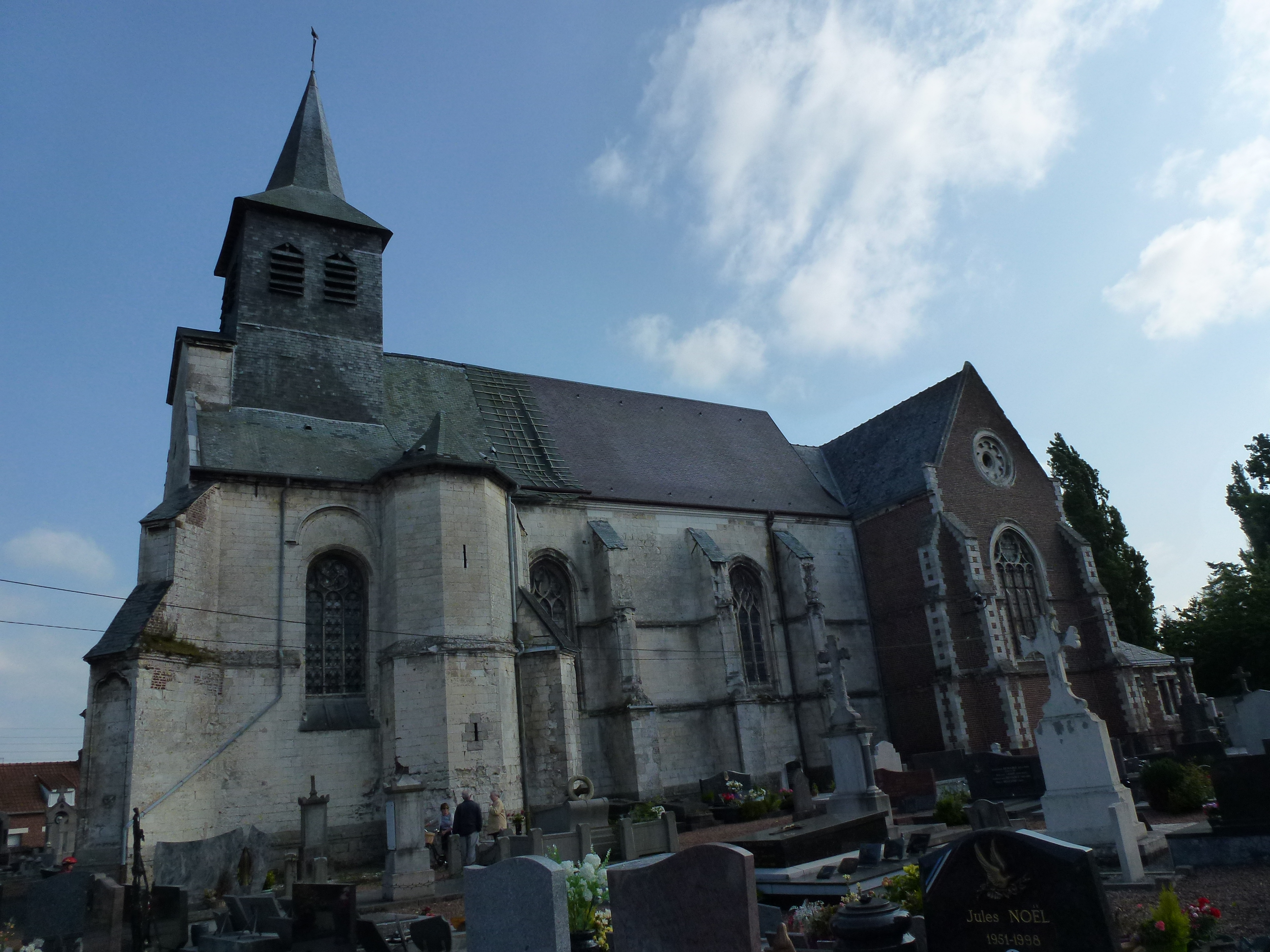
- The church of Norrent-Fontes

- Coat of arms
- Location of Norrent-Fontes
- Location within France Location within Hauts-de-France
- Coordinates: 50°35′19″N 2°24′29″E
- Country: France
- Region: Hauts-de-France
- Department: Pas-de-Calais
- Arrondissement: Béthune
- Canton: Lillers
- Intercommunality: CA Béthune-Bruay, Artois-Lys Romane

Government
  - Mayor (2020–2026): Bertrand Cocq
- Area^{1}: 5.7 km^{2} (2.2 sq mi)
- Elevation: 27 m (89 ft)
- Highest elevation: 63 m (207 ft)
- Lowest elevation: 19 m (62 ft)
- Population (2023): 1,381
  - Density: 240/km^{2} (630/sq mi)
- Time zone: UTC+01:00 (CET)
  - Summer (DST): UTC+02:00 (CEST)
- INSEE/Postal code: 62620 /62120
- ^{1} French Land Register data, which excludes lakes, ponds, glaciers > 1 km^{2} (0.386 sq mi or 247 acres) and river estuaries.

Norrent-Fontes (French pronunciation: [nɔʁɑ̃ fɔ̃t]; West Flemish: Norrem) is a commune in the Pas-de-Calais department in the Hauts-de-France region of France about 10 miles (16 km) northwest of Béthune and 33 miles (53 km) west of Lille.

== Population ==
Historical population
Year	Pop.	±% p.a.
1968	1,343	—
1975	1,401	+0.61%
1982	1,490	+0.88%
1990	1,499	+0.08%
1999	1,444	−0.41%
2007	1,433	−0.10%
2012	1,459	+0.36%
2017	1,398	−0.85%
2023	1,381	−0.20%
Source: INSEE

== See also ==
- Communes of the Pas-de-Calais department
