= Ecquedecques =

Ecquedecques Eskeldeke
- Commune
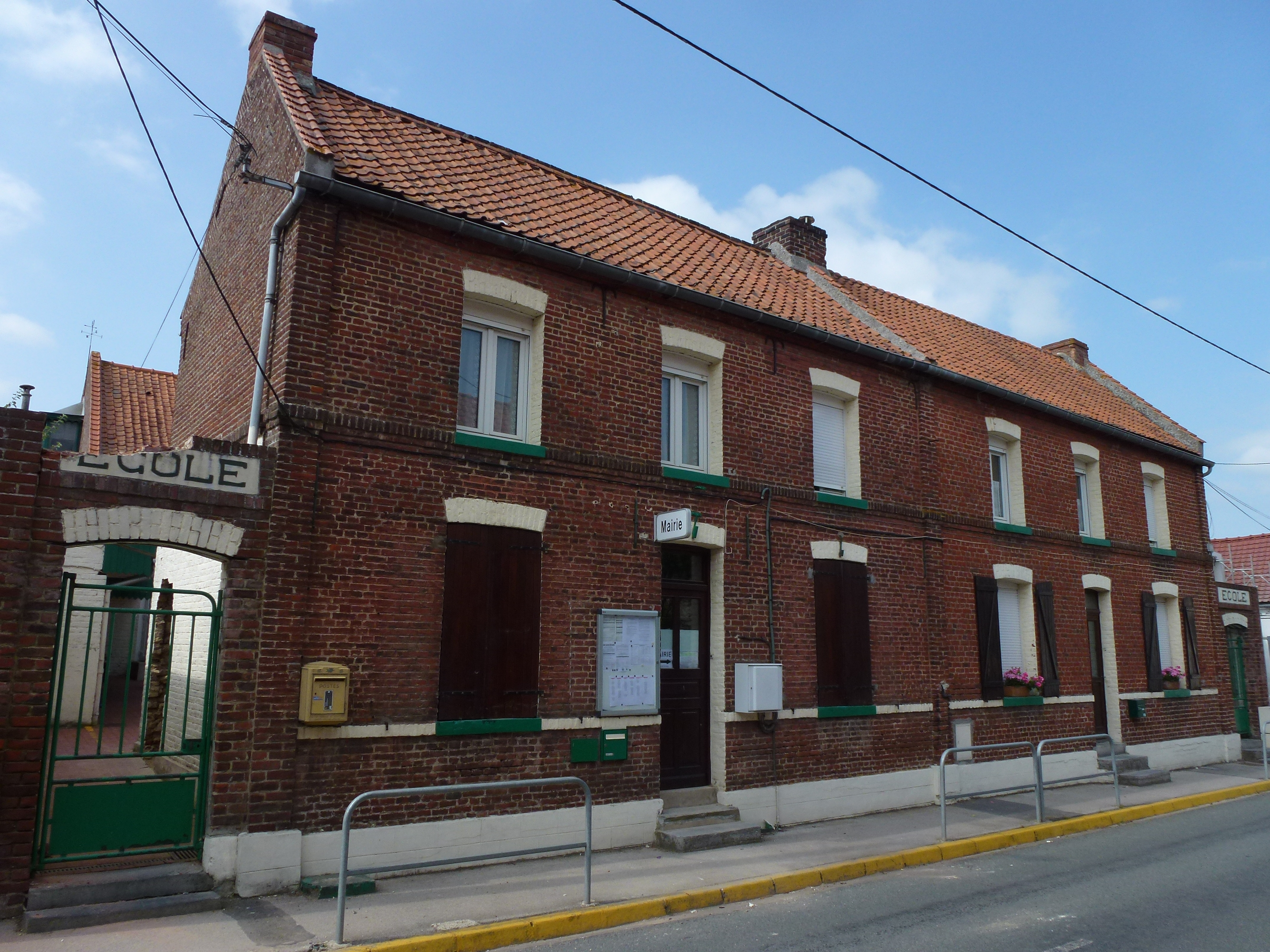
- The town hall and school of Ecquedecques

- Coat of arms
- Location of Ecquedecques
- Location within France Location within Hauts-de-France
- Coordinates: 50°33′42″N 2°26′56″E
- Country: France
- Region: Hauts-de-France
- Department: Pas-de-Calais
- Arrondissement: Béthune
- Canton: Lillers
- Intercommunality: CA Béthune-Bruay, Artois-Lys Romane

Government
  - Mayor (2020–2026): Rosemonde Mullet
- Area^{1}: 2.63 km^{2} (1.02 sq mi)
- Elevation: 33 m (108 ft)
- Highest elevation: 75 m (246 ft)
- Lowest elevation: 26 m (85 ft)
- Population (2023): 511
  - Density: 194/km^{2} (503/sq mi)
- Time zone: UTC+01:00 (CET)
  - Summer (DST): UTC+02:00 (CEST)
- INSEE/Postal code: 62286 /62190
- ^{1} French Land Register data, which excludes lakes, ponds, glaciers > 1 km^{2} (0.386 sq mi or 247 acres) and river estuaries.

Ecquedecques (French pronunciation: [ɛkdɛk]; West Flemish: Eskeldeke) is a commune in the Pas-de-Calais department in the Hauts-de-France region of France.

== Geography ==
A farming village some 9 miles (14 km) southwest of Béthune and 30 miles (48 km) southwest of Lille, at the junction of the D185 and the D185E roads. The A26 autoroute passes by just a few yards from the commune.

== Population ==
Historical population
Year	Pop.	±% p.a.
1968	428	—
1975	399	−1.00%
1982	420	+0.74%
1990	410	−0.30%
1999	407	−0.08%
2007	476	+1.98%
2012	491	+0.62%
2017	513	+0.88%
2023	511	−0.07%
Source: INSEE

== Places of interest ==
- The church of St.Omer, dating from the fifteenth century.

== See also ==
- Communes of the Pas-de-Calais department
