= Allouagne =

- Commune
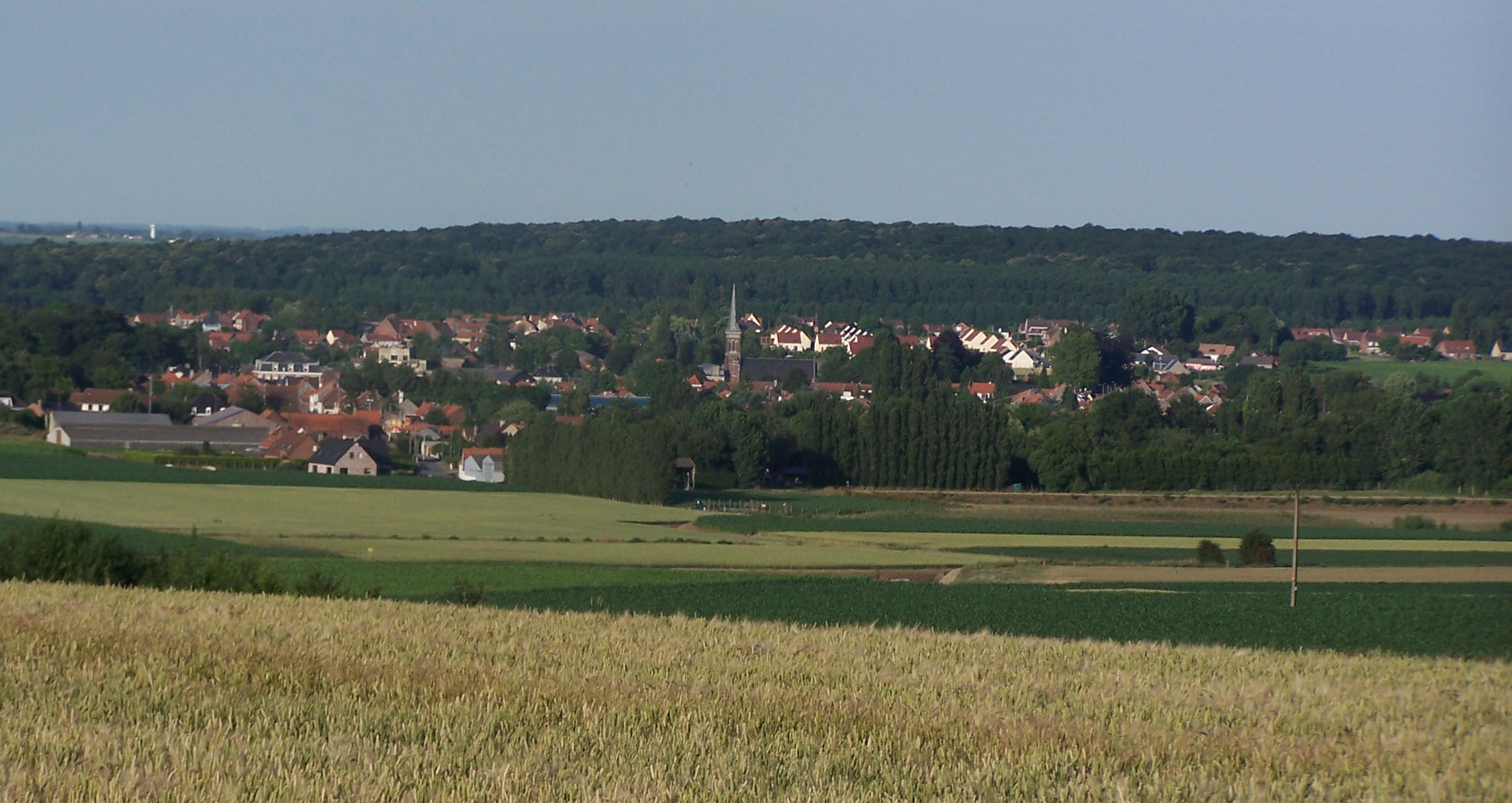
- A general view of Allouagne

- Coat of arms
- Location of Allouagne
- Location within France Location within Hauts-de-France
- Coordinates: 50°31′52″N 2°30′32″E
- Country: France
- Region: Hauts-de-France
- Department: Pas-de-Calais
- Arrondissement: Béthune
- Canton: Lillers
- Intercommunality: CA Béthune-Bruay, Artois-Lys Romane

Government
  - Mayor (2020–2026): André Hennebelle
- Area^{1}: 7.81 km^{2} (3.02 sq mi)
- Elevation: 50 m (160 ft)
- Highest elevation: 100 m (330 ft)
- Lowest elevation: 20 m (66 ft)
- Population (2023): 2,823
  - Density: 361/km^{2} (936/sq mi)
- Time zone: UTC+01:00 (CET)
  - Summer (DST): UTC+02:00 (CEST)
- INSEE/Postal code: 62023 /62157
- ^{1} French Land Register data, which excludes lakes, ponds, glaciers > 1 km^{2} (0.386 sq mi or 247 acres) and river estuaries.

Allouagne (French pronunciation: [alwaɲ]; Picard: Allouanne) is a commune in the Pas-de-Calais department in the Hauts-de-France region of France.

== Geography ==
A large farming village situated some 6 miles (9.7 km) west of Béthune and 30 miles (48 km) southwest of Lille, at the junction of the D188 and the D183 roads. The town is bypassed by the A26 autoroute to the north.

== Population ==
Historical population
Year	Pop.	±% p.a.
1968	2,918	—
1975	2,964	+0.22%
1982	2,970	+0.03%
1990	3,055	+0.35%
1999	3,055	+0.00%
2007	3,057	+0.01%
2012	3,008	−0.32%
2017	2,925	−0.56%
2023	2,823	−0.59%
Source: INSEE

== Sights ==
- Two manorhouses, dating from the 16th and 17th century.
- The church of Saint-Leger, dating from the twentieth century.

== International relations ==
Allouagne is twinned with:

- Ergste, a district of Schwerte in Germany

== See also ==
- Communes of the Pas-de-Calais department
