= Mont-Bernanchon =

- Commune
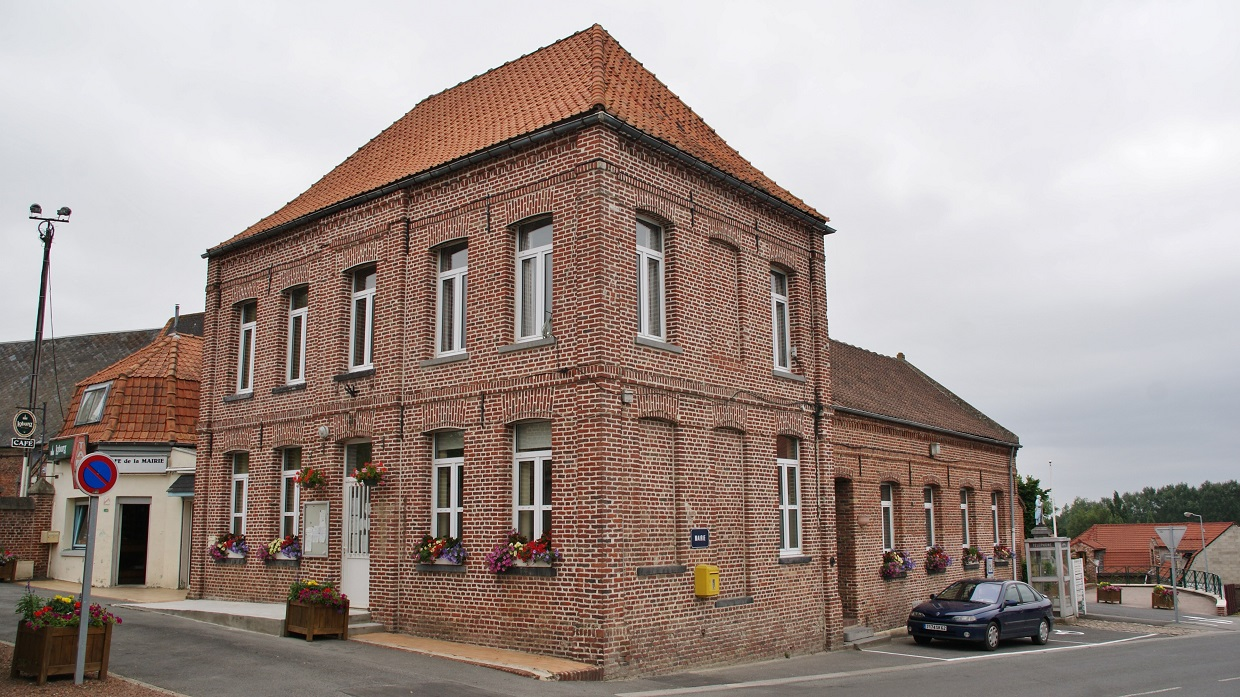
- The town hall of Mont-Bernanchon

- Coat of arms
- Location of Mont-Bernanchon
- Location within France Location within Hauts-de-France
- Coordinates: 50°35′02″N 2°35′25″E
- Country: France
- Region: Hauts-de-France
- Department: Pas-de-Calais
- Arrondissement: Béthune
- Canton: Lillers
- Intercommunality: CA Béthune-Bruay, Artois-Lys Romane

Government
  - Mayor (2020–2026): Marie-Claude Duhamel
- Area^{1}: 11.4 km^{2} (4.4 sq mi)
- Elevation: 29 m (95 ft)
- Highest elevation: 37 m (121 ft)
- Lowest elevation: 16 m (52 ft)
- Population (2023): 1,317
  - Density: 116/km^{2} (299/sq mi)
- Time zone: UTC+01:00 (CET)
  - Summer (DST): UTC+02:00 (CEST)
- INSEE/Postal code: 62584 /62350
- ^{1} French Land Register data, which excludes lakes, ponds, glaciers > 1 km^{2} (0.386 sq mi or 247 acres) and river estuaries.

Mont-Bernanchon (French pronunciation: [mɔ̃ bɛʁnɑ̃ʃɔ̃]) is a commune in the Pas-de-Calais department in the Hauts-de-France region of France. about 5 miles (8.0 km) north of Béthune and 27 miles (43 km) west of Lille.

== Population ==
Historical population
| Year | Pop. | ±% p.a. |
|---|---|---|
| 1968 | 861 | — |
| 1975 | 872 | +0.18% |
| 1982 | 972 | +1.56% |
| 1990 | 1,262 | +3.32% |
| 1999 | 1,170 | −0.84% |
| 2007 | 1,343 | +1.74% |
| 2012 | 1,383 | +0.59% |
| 2017 | 1,359 | −0.35% |
| 2023 | 1,317 | −0.52% |
Source: INSEE

== See also ==
- Communes of the Pas-de-Calais department
