= Saint-Venant =

Saint-Venant Papingem
- Commune
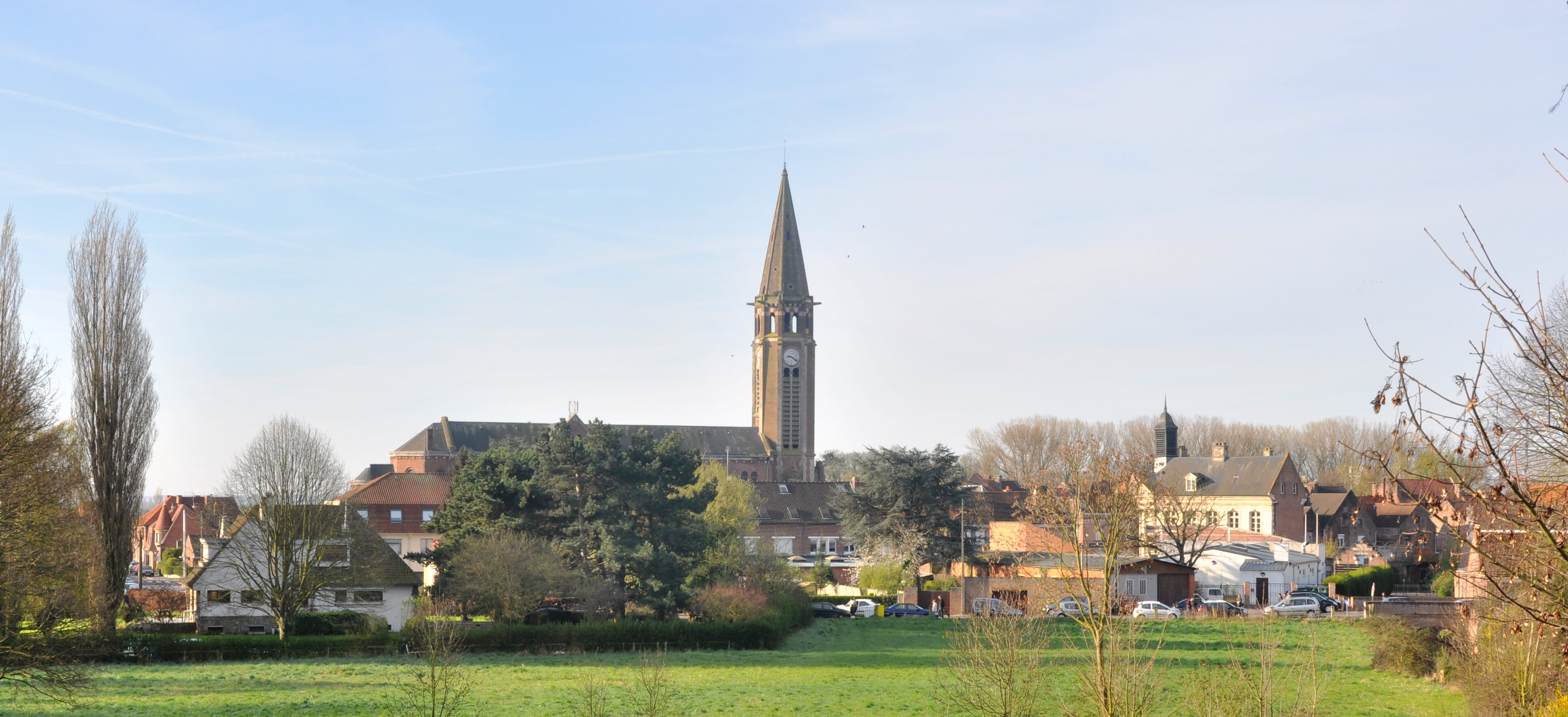
- A general view of Saint-Venant

- Coat of arms
- Location of Saint-Venant
- Location within France Location within Hauts-de-France
- Coordinates: 50°37′24″N 2°32′43″E
- Country: France
- Region: Hauts-de-France
- Department: Pas-de-Calais
- Arrondissement: Béthune
- Canton: Lillers
- Intercommunality: CA Béthune-Bruay, Artois-Lys Romane

Government
  - Mayor (2020–2026): André Flajolet
- Area^{1}: 14.24 km^{2} (5.50 sq mi)
- Elevation: 18 m (59 ft)
- Population (2023): 2,999
  - Density: 210.6/km^{2} (545.5/sq mi)
- Time zone: UTC+01:00 (CET)
  - Summer (DST): UTC+02:00 (CEST)
- INSEE/Postal code: 62770 /62350
- ^{1} French Land Register data, which excludes lakes, ponds, glaciers > 1 km^{2} (0.386 sq mi or 247 acres) and river estuaries.

Saint-Venant (West Flemish: Papingem) is a commune in the Pas-de-Calais department (administrative division) in the Hauts-de-France region of France about 9 miles (14 km) northwest of Béthune and 26 miles (42 km) west of Lille, by the banks of the Lys.

== Population ==
Historical population
Year	Pop.	±% p.a.
1968	4,328	—
1975	3,988	−1.16%
1982	4,127	+0.49%
1990	3,887	−0.75%
1999	3,206	−2.12%
2007	3,274	+0.26%
2012	2,996	−1.76%
2017	3,027	+0.21%
2023	2,999	−0.15%
Source: INSEE

== See also ==
- Communes of the Pas-de-Calais department
