= Burbure =

- Commune
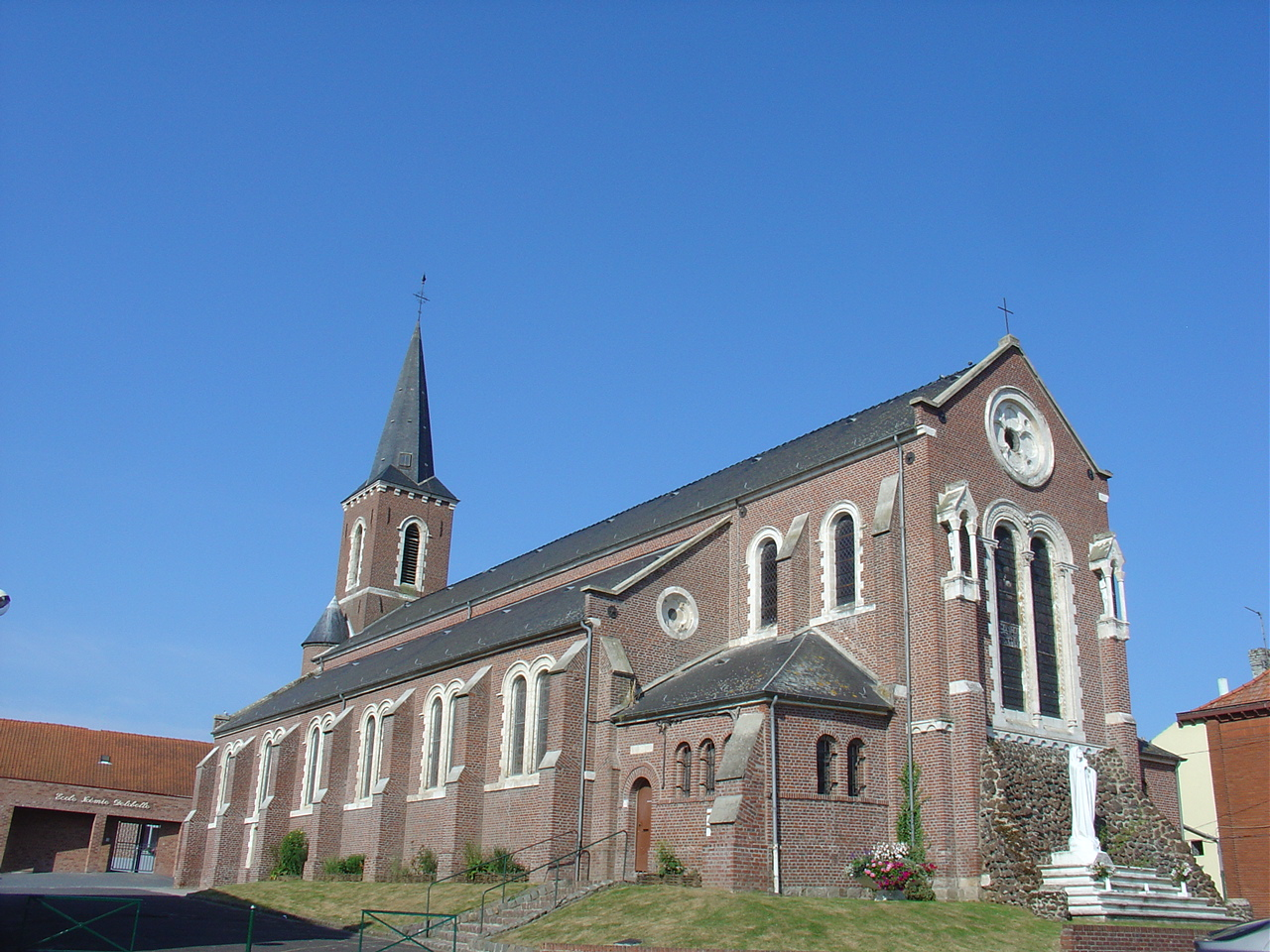
- The church of Burbure

- Coat of arms
- Location of Burbure
- Location within France Location within Hauts-de-France
- Coordinates: 50°32′21″N 2°28′04″E
- Country: France
- Region: Hauts-de-France
- Department: Pas-de-Calais
- Arrondissement: Béthune
- Canton: Lillers
- Intercommunality: CA Béthune-Bruay, Artois-Lys Romane

Government
  - Mayor (2020–2026): René Hocq
- Area^{1}: 5.53 km^{2} (2.14 sq mi)
- Elevation: 51 m (167 ft)
- Highest elevation: 98 m (322 ft)
- Lowest elevation: 33 m (108 ft)
- Population (2023): 2,834
  - Density: 512/km^{2} (1,330/sq mi)
- Time zone: UTC+01:00 (CET)
  - Summer (DST): UTC+02:00 (CEST)
- INSEE/Postal code: 62188 /62151
- ^{1} French Land Register data, which excludes lakes, ponds, glaciers > 1 km^{2} (0.386 sq mi or 247 acres) and river estuaries.

Burbure (French pronunciation: [byʁbyʁ]) is a commune in the Pas-de-Calais department in the Hauts-de-France region in northern France.

== Geography ==
A farming village some 8 miles (13 km) west of Béthune and 30 miles (48 km) southwest of Lille, at the junction of the D916 and the D182 roads.

== Population ==
Historical population
Year	Pop.	±% p.a.
1968	3,379	—
1975	3,476	+0.41%
1982	3,132	−1.48%
1990	3,011	−0.49%
1999	2,840	−0.65%
2007	2,909	+0.30%
2012	3,036	+0.86%
2017	2,865	−1.15%
2023	2,834	−0.18%
Source: INSEE

== Sights ==
- The Church of St. Gervais and Protais, dating from the fifteenth century, was expanded and renovated in 1870.
- The Commonwealth War Graves Commission cemetery.
- The war memorial.

== See also ==
- Communes of the Pas-de-Calais department
