= Lillers =

Lillers Lillaar
- Commune
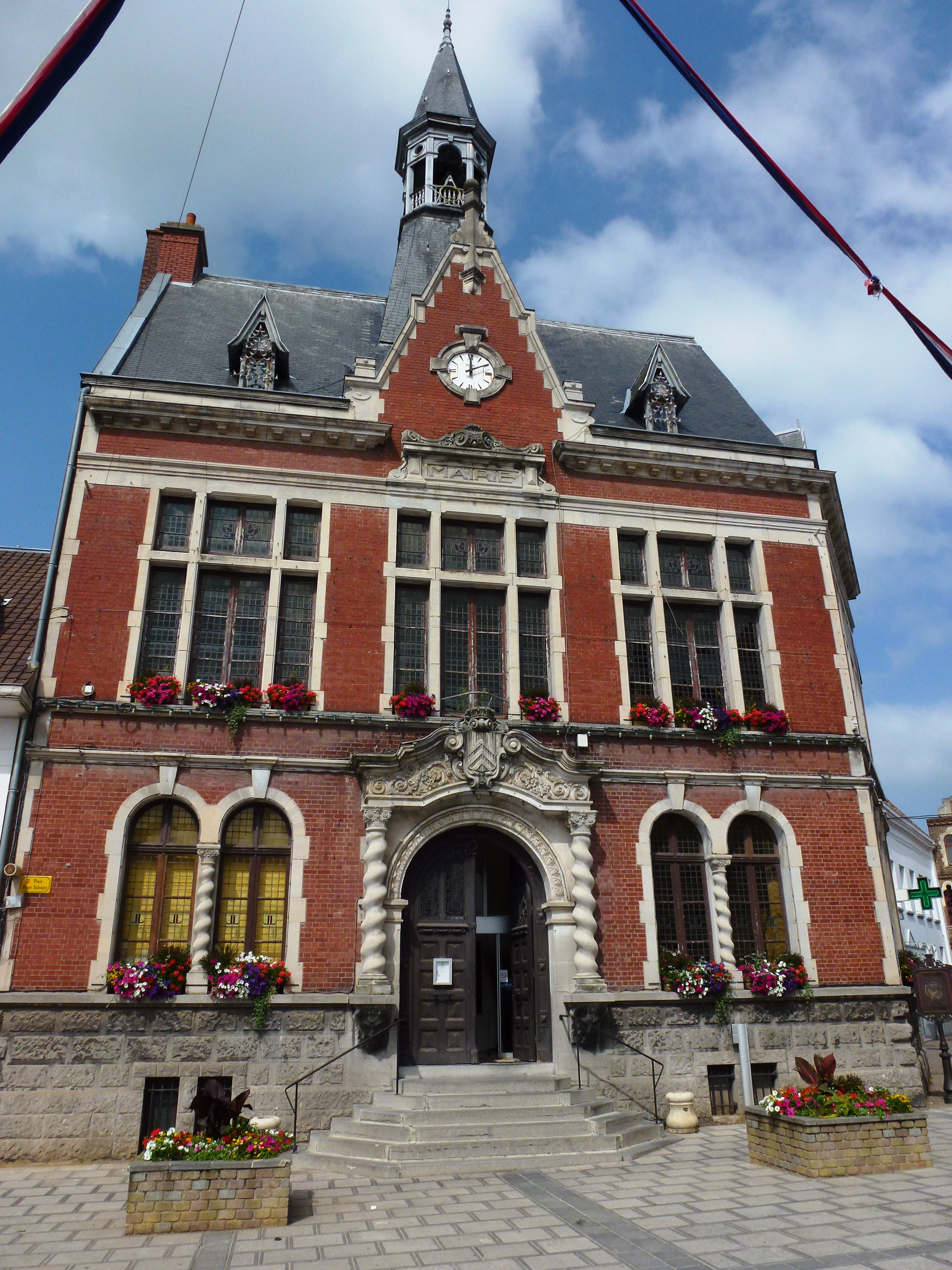
- The town hall of Lillers

- Coat of arms
- Location of Lillers
- Location within France Location within Hauts-de-France
- Coordinates: 50°33′52″N 2°28′59″E
- Country: France
- Region: Hauts-de-France
- Department: Pas-de-Calais
- Arrondissement: Béthune
- Canton: Lillers
- Intercommunality: CA Béthune-Bruay, Artois-Lys Romane

Government
  - Mayor (2020–2026): Carole Dubois
- Area^{1}: 26.9 km^{2} (10.4 sq mi)
- Elevation: 29 m (95 ft)
- Highest elevation: 88 m (289 ft)
- Lowest elevation: 18 m (59 ft)
- Population (2023): 10,193
  - Density: 379/km^{2} (981/sq mi)
- Time zone: UTC+01:00 (CET)
  - Summer (DST): UTC+02:00 (CEST)
- INSEE/Postal code: 62516 /62190
- ^{1} French Land Register data, which excludes lakes, ponds, glaciers > 1 km^{2} (0.386 sq mi or 247 acres) and river estuaries.

Lillers (French pronunciation: [lilɛʁ]; West Flemish: Lillaar) is a commune in the Pas-de-Calais department in the Hauts-de-France region of France about 15 km northwest of Béthune and 40 km west of Lille. The river Clarence flows through the town.

== History ==
After being owned by the Counts of Flanders, Lillers, which had been fortified against the Normans was given as a dowry in 1179 to King Philip II Augustus of France. In 1327, Artois was created a county by Louis IX. His brother Robert became the first Count. In 1303, the city of Lillers was looted by the Flemings. In 1340, King Edward III of England claimed the throne of France and started the Hundred Years War, marked by two famous battles, that of Crécy 1346 and that of Battle of Agincourt, 1415, where Robert Wavrin, Lord of Lillers, met his death. In 1542, during the war against Charles V, Holy Roman Emperor, French troops burned Lillers. The population were still living in tents or huts three years later.

After a period of peace, the Thirty Years' War caused devastation in the region. In 1637, the town was taken by Marshall de la Ferté for Spain. In 1639, it was won back by Marshall de la Meilleraye to become French again. The Spanish retook it, only to be beaten off by the French in 1657. In 1659, the Treaty of the Pyrenees was concluded, which ceded most of the Artois to France, except Saint-Omer and Aire-sur-la-Lys.

In 1710, the region was the scene of the War of Spanish Succession. In 1710, Lillers was taken by Spanish troops. The allied British, German and Dutch forces under the command of the Duke of Marlborough established their headquarters at Lillers until forced out by the Marquis de Goesbriand, the head of the French troops.

The Treaty of Utrecht ended the war in 1713, when Lillers found itself a part of France. The still thriving shoe industries of Lillers started in the 19th century.

== Population ==
Historical population
Year	Pop.	±% p.a.
1968	9,436	—
1975	9,421	−0.02%
1982	9,509	+0.13%
1990	9,666	+0.20%
1999	9,775	+0.12%
2007	9,875	+0.13%
2012	9,988	+0.23%
2017	9,931	−0.11%
2023	10,193	+0.43%
Source: INSEE

== Notable people ==
- Henri Leconte, tennis player, was born there in 1963.

== See also ==
- Communes of the Pas-de-Calais department
