= Saint-Floris =

Saint-Floris Sint-Floris
- Commune
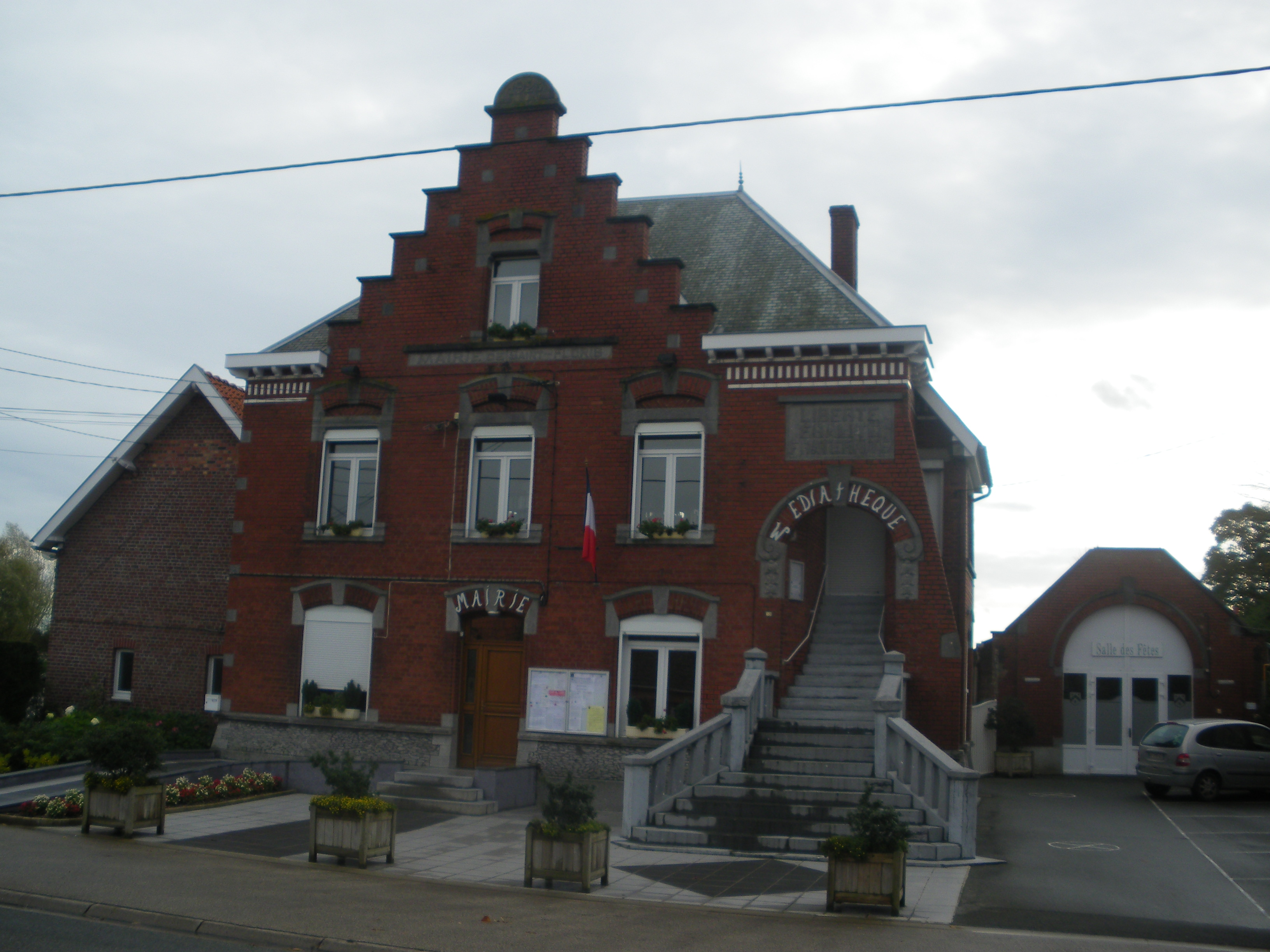
- The town hall of Saint-Floris

- Coat of arms
- Location of Saint-Floris
- Location within France Location within Hauts-de-France
- Coordinates: 50°37′40″N 2°34′14″E
- Country: France
- Region: Hauts-de-France
- Department: Pas-de-Calais
- Arrondissement: Béthune
- Canton: Lillers
- Intercommunality: CA Béthune-Bruay, Artois-Lys Romane

Government
  - Mayor (2023–2026): Olivier Debaecker
- Area^{1}: 4.05 km^{2} (1.56 sq mi)
- Elevation: 18 m (59 ft)
- Highest elevation: 18 m (59 ft)
- Lowest elevation: 14 m (46 ft)
- Population (2023): 618
  - Density: 153/km^{2} (395/sq mi)
- Time zone: UTC+01:00 (CET)
  - Summer (DST): UTC+02:00 (CEST)
- INSEE/Postal code: 62747 /62350
- ^{1} French Land Register data, which excludes lakes, ponds, glaciers > 1 km^{2} (0.386 sq mi or 247 acres) and river estuaries.

Saint-Floris (West Flemish: Sint-Floris) is a commune in the Pas-de-Calais department in the Hauts-de-France region of France about 9 miles (14 km) north of Béthune and 30 miles (48 km) west of Lille. The canalized river Lys flows through the commune, forming part of the border with the department of Nord.

== Population ==
Historical population
Year	Pop.	±% p.a.
1968	313	—
1975	326	+0.58%
1982	353	+1.14%
1990	416	+2.07%
1999	413	−0.08%
2007	456	+1.25%
2012	540	+3.44%
2017	592	+1.86%
2023	618	+0.72%
Source: INSEE

== See also ==
- Communes of the Pas-de-Calais department
