= Bourecq =

- Commune
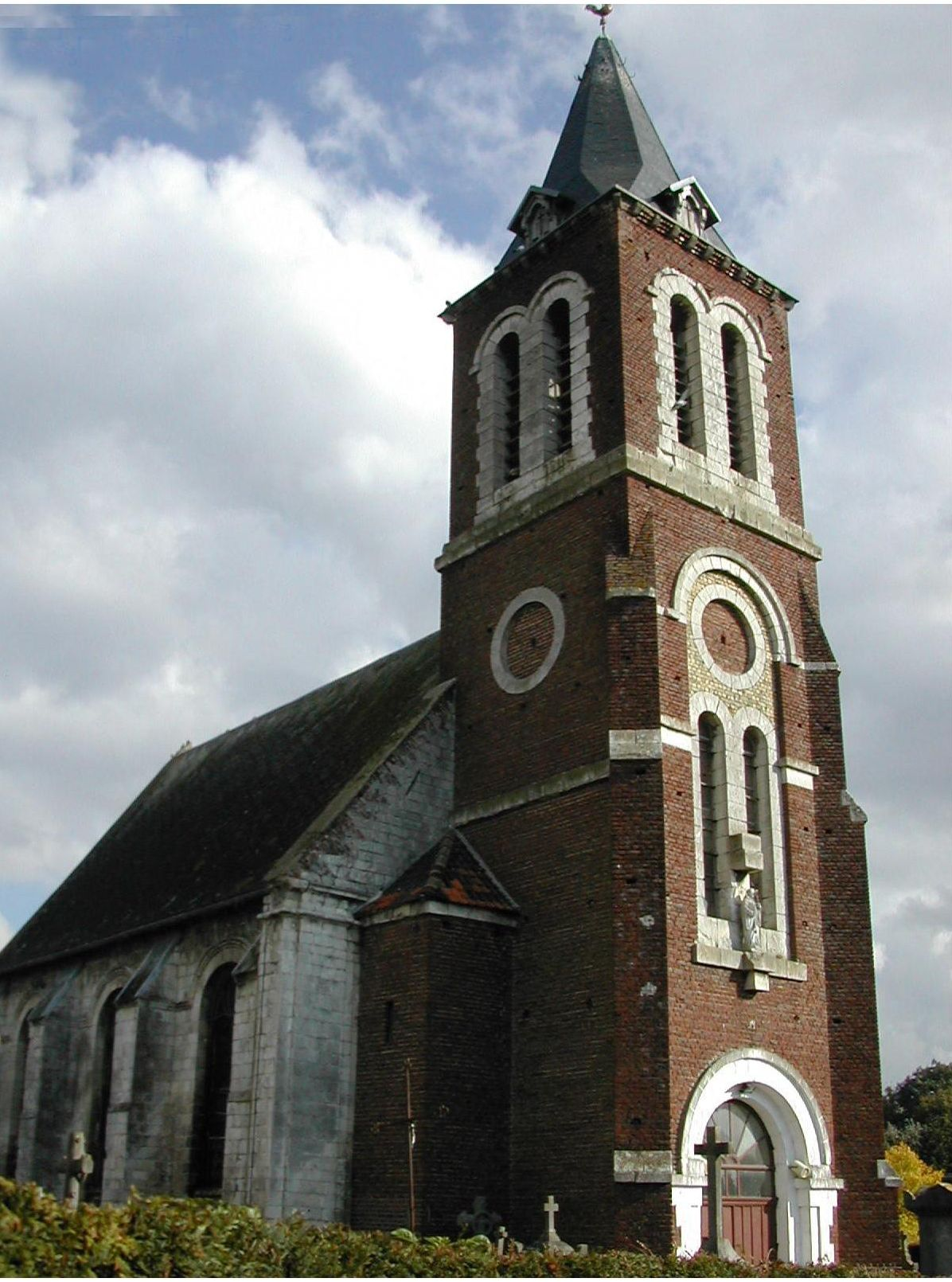
- The church of Bourecq

- Coat of arms
- Location of Bourecq
- Location within France Location within Hauts-de-France
- Coordinates: 50°34′17″N 2°26′10″E
- Country: France
- Region: Hauts-de-France
- Department: Pas-de-Calais
- Arrondissement: Béthune
- Canton: Lillers
- Intercommunality: CA Béthune-Bruay, Artois-Lys Romane

Government
  - Mayor (2020–2026): Alain Barrois
- Area^{1}: 4.02 km^{2} (1.55 sq mi)
- Elevation: 32 m (105 ft)
- Highest elevation: 49 m (161 ft)
- Lowest elevation: 22 m (72 ft)
- Population (2023): 568
  - Density: 141/km^{2} (366/sq mi)
- Time zone: UTC+01:00 (CET)
  - Summer (DST): UTC+02:00 (CEST)
- INSEE/Postal code: 62162 /62190
- ^{1} French Land Register data, which excludes lakes, ponds, glaciers > 1 km^{2} (0.386 sq mi or 247 acres) and river estuaries.

Bourecq (French pronunciation: [buʁɛk]) is a commune in the Pas-de-Calais department in the Hauts-de-France region in northern France.

== Geography ==
A farming village some 10 miles (16 km) northwest of Béthune and 31 miles (50 km) west of Lille, at the junction of the D94E3 and N43 roads, with the A26 autoroute passing by less than a mile away.

== Population ==
Historical population
| Year | Pop. | ±% p.a. |
|---|---|---|
| 1968 | 565 | — |
| 1975 | 607 | +1.03% |
| 1982 | 556 | −1.25% |
| 1990 | 560 | +0.09% |
| 1999 | 517 | −0.88% |
| 2007 | 530 | +0.31% |
| 2012 | 597 | +2.41% |
| 2017 | 639 | +1.37% |
| 2023 | 568 | −1.94% |
Source: INSEE

== Sights ==
- The church of St. Riquier, dating from the twentieth century.
- The remains of the chateau of Malannoy.
- An ancient 16th century manorhouse.

== See also ==
- Communes of the Pas-de-Calais department
