= Calonne-sur-la-Lys =

- Commune
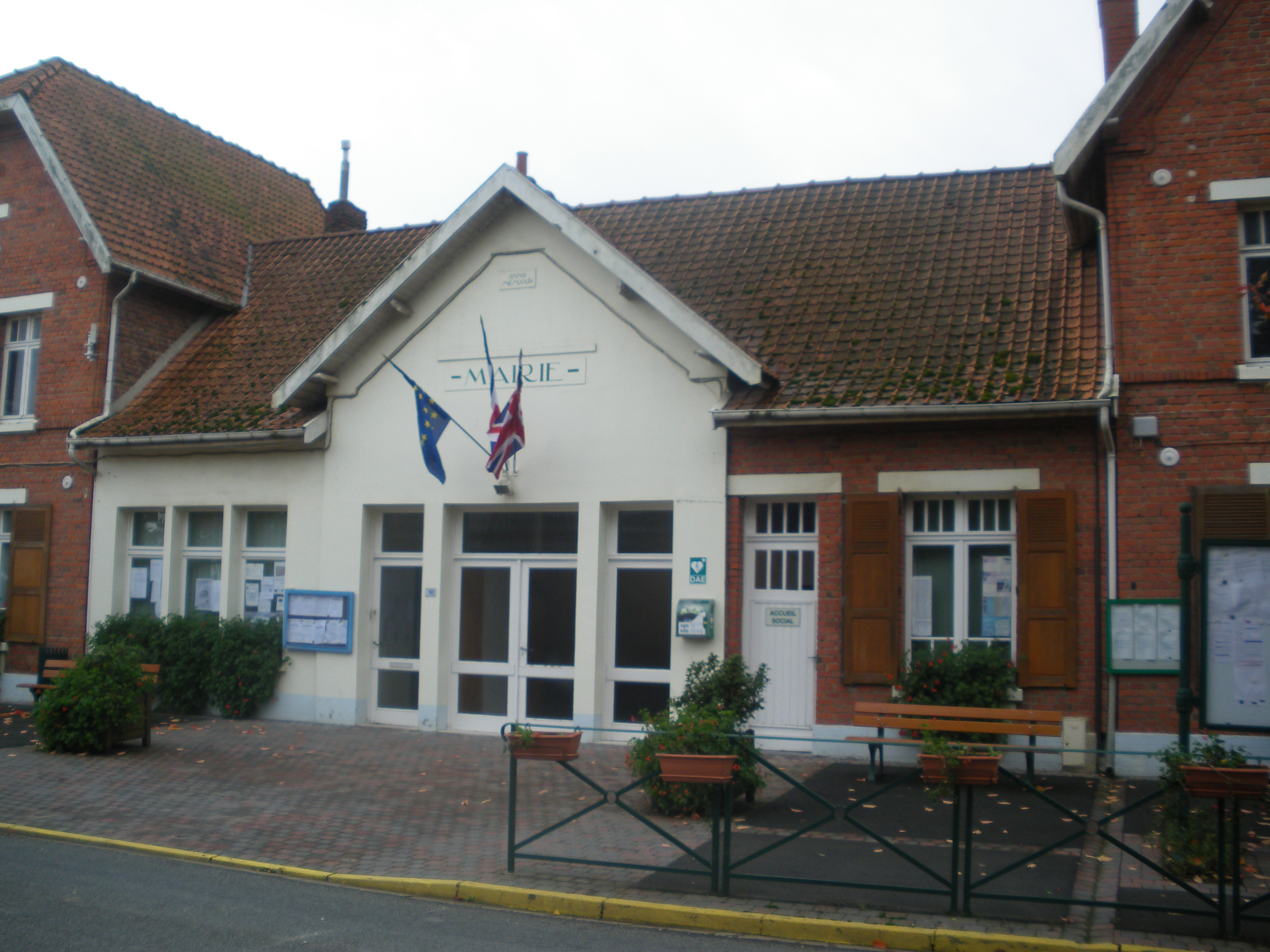
- The town hall of Calonne-sur-la-Lys

- Coat of arms
- Location of Calonne-sur-la-Lys
- Location within France Location within Hauts-de-France
- Coordinates: 50°37′24″N 2°37′03″E
- Country: France
- Region: Hauts-de-France
- Department: Pas-de-Calais
- Arrondissement: Béthune
- Canton: Lillers
- Intercommunality: CA Béthune-Bruay, Artois-Lys Romane

Government
  - Mayor (2020–2026): Dominique Queste
- Area^{1}: 11 km^{2} (4.2 sq mi)
- Elevation: 18 m (59 ft)
- Highest elevation: 19 m (62 ft)
- Lowest elevation: 13 m (43 ft)
- Population (2023): 1,595
  - Density: 140/km^{2} (380/sq mi)
- Time zone: UTC+01:00 (CET)
  - Summer (DST): UTC+02:00 (CEST)
- INSEE/Postal code: 62195 /62350
- ^{1} French Land Register data, which excludes lakes, ponds, glaciers > 1 km^{2} (0.386 sq mi or 247 acres) and river estuaries.

Calonne-sur-la-Lys (French pronunciation: [kalɔn syʁ la lis], literally Calonne on the Lys) is a commune in the Pas-de-Calais department in the Hauts-de-France region of France. about 7 miles (11 km) north of Béthune and 22 miles (35 km) west of Lille, by the banks of the river Lys, the border with the department of Nord.

== Population ==
Historical population
Year	Pop.	±% p.a.
1968	1,193	—
1975	1,134	−0.72%
1982	1,366	+2.69%
1990	1,493	+1.12%
1999	1,508	+0.11%
2007	1,594	+0.70%
2012	1,622	+0.35%
2017	1,545	−0.97%
2023	1,595	+0.53%
Source: INSEE

== Notable people ==
- Robert Gaguin, humanist, was born there in 1433.

== See also ==
- Communes of the Pas-de-Calais department
