= Gonnehem =

- Commune
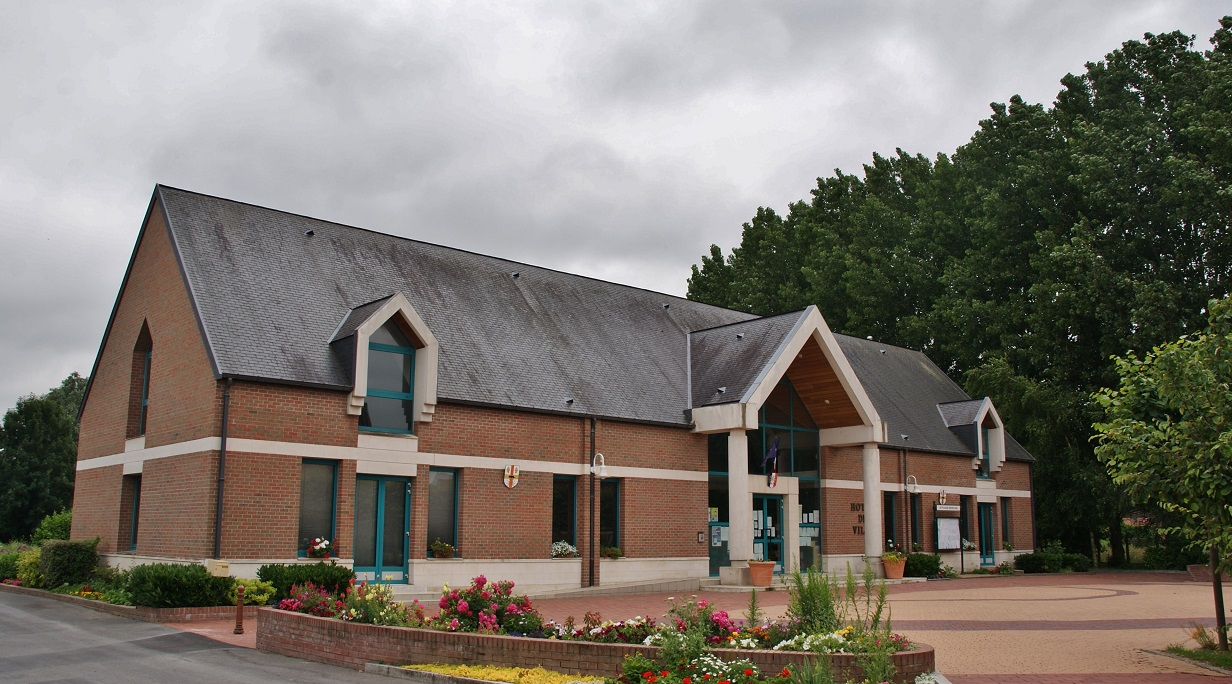
- The town hall of Gonnehem

- Coat of arms
- Location of Gonnehem
- Location within France Location within Hauts-de-France
- Coordinates: 50°33′44″N 2°34′29″E
- Country: France
- Region: Hauts-de-France
- Department: Pas-de-Calais
- Arrondissement: Béthune
- Canton: Lillers
- Intercommunality: CA Béthune-Bruay, Artois-Lys Romane

Government
  - Mayor (2020–2026): Bernard Delelis
- Area^{1}: 15.31 km^{2} (5.91 sq mi)
- Elevation: 20 m (66 ft)
- Highest elevation: 44 m (144 ft)
- Lowest elevation: 17 m (56 ft)
- Population (2023): 2,525
  - Density: 164.9/km^{2} (427.2/sq mi)
- Time zone: UTC+01:00 (CET)
  - Summer (DST): UTC+02:00 (CEST)
- INSEE/Postal code: 62376 /62920
- ^{1} French Land Register data, which excludes lakes, ponds, glaciers > 1 km^{2} (0.386 sq mi or 247 acres) and river estuaries.

Gonnehem (French pronunciation: [ɡɔn(ə)ɛm]; Picard: Gonhin) is a commune in the Pas-de-Calais department in the Hauts-de-France region of France.

The trumpeter Marc Geujon was born in Gonneheim on 8 October 1974.

== Geography ==
A large farming village situated some 5 miles (8.0 km) northwest of Béthune and 22 miles (35 km) west of Lille, at the junction of the D181, D182 and the D70 roads.

== Population ==
Historical population
Year	Pop.	±% p.a.
1968	1,755	—
1975	1,740	−0.12%
1982	1,805	+0.53%
1990	2,172	+2.34%
1999	2,139	−0.17%
2007	2,289	+0.85%
2012	2,519	+1.93%
2017	2,536	+0.13%
2023	2,525	−0.07%
Source: INSEE

== Places of interest ==
- The fifteenth-century chateau de Werppe.
- The manorhouse de Bron, dating from the fifteenth century.
- The church of St.Pierre, dating from the sixteenth century.
- The church at the hamlet of Busnettes.

== See also ==
- Communes of the Pas-de-Calais department
