= Nave (river) =

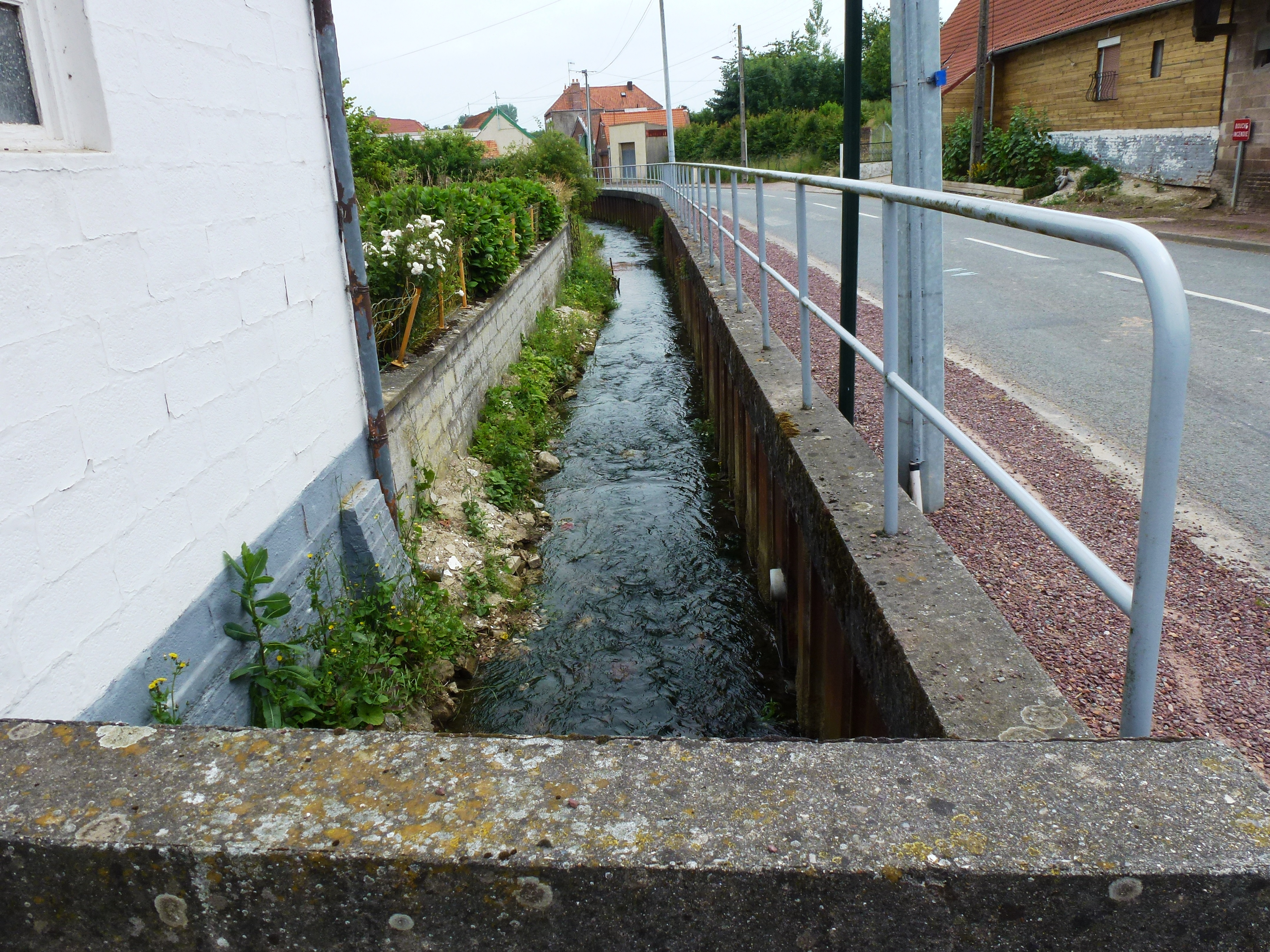

- Location within France Location within Hauts-de-France

Location
- Country: France

Physical characteristics
- Source
  - location: Nédonchel
- Mouth
  - location: Clarence
  - coordinates: 50°34′45″N 2°33′39″E
- Length: 22 km (14 mi)

Basin features
- Progression: Clarence→ Lys→ Scheldt→ North Sea

The Nave (French pronunciation: [nav]) is a river in France, in the department of Pas-de-Calais. It has its source in Fontaine-les-Hermans, and then flows into the Clarence up to Gonnehem after a short course of 22 kilometres (14 mi).
