= Canton of Norrent-Fontes =

Coordinates: 50°35′20″N 2°22′58″E

The Canton of Norrent-Fontes was one of the 14 cantons of the arrondissement of Béthune, in the Pas-de-Calais department, in northern France. It was disbanded following the French canton reorganisation which came into effect in March 2015. Its chief town was Norrent-Fontes. It had 19,753 inhabitants in 2012. It was disbanded following the French canton reorganisation which came into effect in March 2015.

The canton comprised 18 communes:

- Auchy-au-Bois
- Blessy
- Bourecq
- Estrée-Blanche
- Ham-en-Artois
- Isbergues
- Lambres
- Liettres
- Ligny-lès-Aire
- Linghem
- Mazinghem
- Norrent-Fontes
- Quernes
- Rely
- Rombly
- Saint-Hilaire-Cottes
- Westrehem
- Witternesse
