= List of châteaux in Nord-Pas-de-Calais =

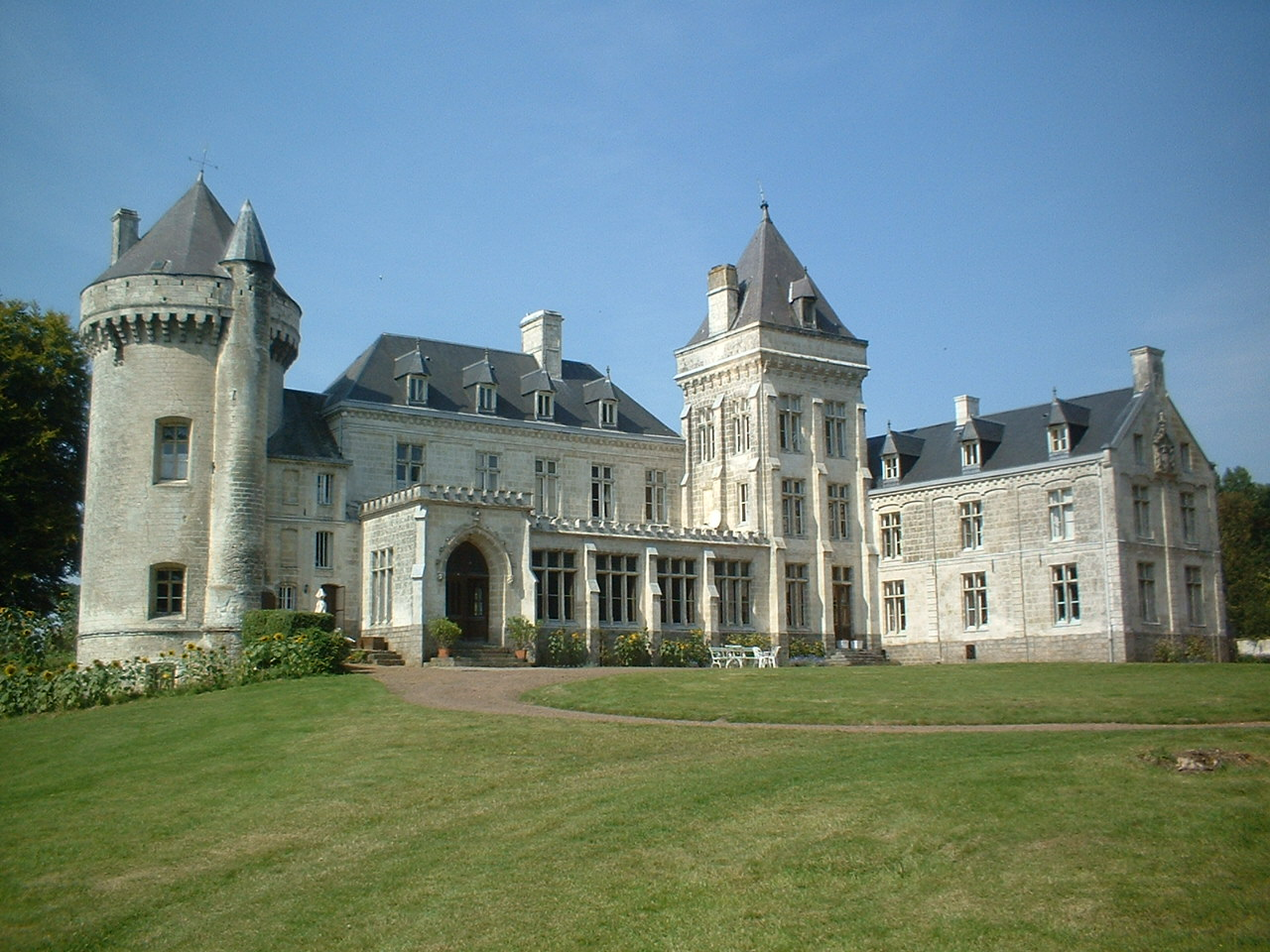
Château de Villers-Châtel

This article is a list of châteaux in the former region of Nord-Pas-de-Calais, France.

== Nord ==
=== Arrondissement of Avesnes-sur-Helpe ===
Château de Potelle in Potelle
Château de Rametz in Saint-Waast-la-Vallée
Château de Trélon in Trélon
Château d'Audignies in Audignies

=== Arrondissement of Cambrai ===
Château d'Esnes in Esnes
Château de la Motte Fénelon in Cambrai
Château de Rieux in Rieux-en-Cambrésis

=== Arrondissement of Douai ===
Château des Frenelles in Bouvignies
Château de Bernicourt in Roost-Warendin
Château de Gœulzin in Gœulzin
Château de Montmonrency in Montigny-en-Ostrevent
Château de Roucourt in Roucourt

=== Arrondissement of Dunkerque ===
Château d'Esquelbecq in Esquelbecq
Château de Gravelines in Gravelines
Château de Steene in Steene
Manoir du Withof in Bourbourg
Château de la Motte-aux-Bois in Morbecque

=== Arrondissement of Lille ===
Name	Type of castle	Commune	Ownership	Classed as historic monument
Château de Courcelette	17th century	Lannoy	?	
Château de Flers	Vineyard	Villeneuve d'Ascq	Commune	Yes
Château de l'Abbaye	First Empire	Cysoing	Commune	Yes
Château de la Phalecque	18th century	Lompret	?	No
Château de la Vigne	17th century	Bondues	Private	?
Château de Prémesques	17th century	Prémesques	Private	?
Château de Robersart	18th century	Wambrechies	Commune	No
Château de Verlinghem	Second Empire	Verlinghem	Private	No
Château des Ormes	19th century	Lambersart	Private	?
Château du Vert Bois	17th century	Bondues	Private	?
Citadelle de Lille	17th century	Lille	Ministry of Defence	No
Ferme des Templiers	Vineyard	Verlinghem	Private	Yes
Hospice Notre-Dame de Seclin	Renaissance and 17th century	Seclin	Hospital	Yes
Palais Rihour	Renaissance; Ruined	Lille	Commune	No

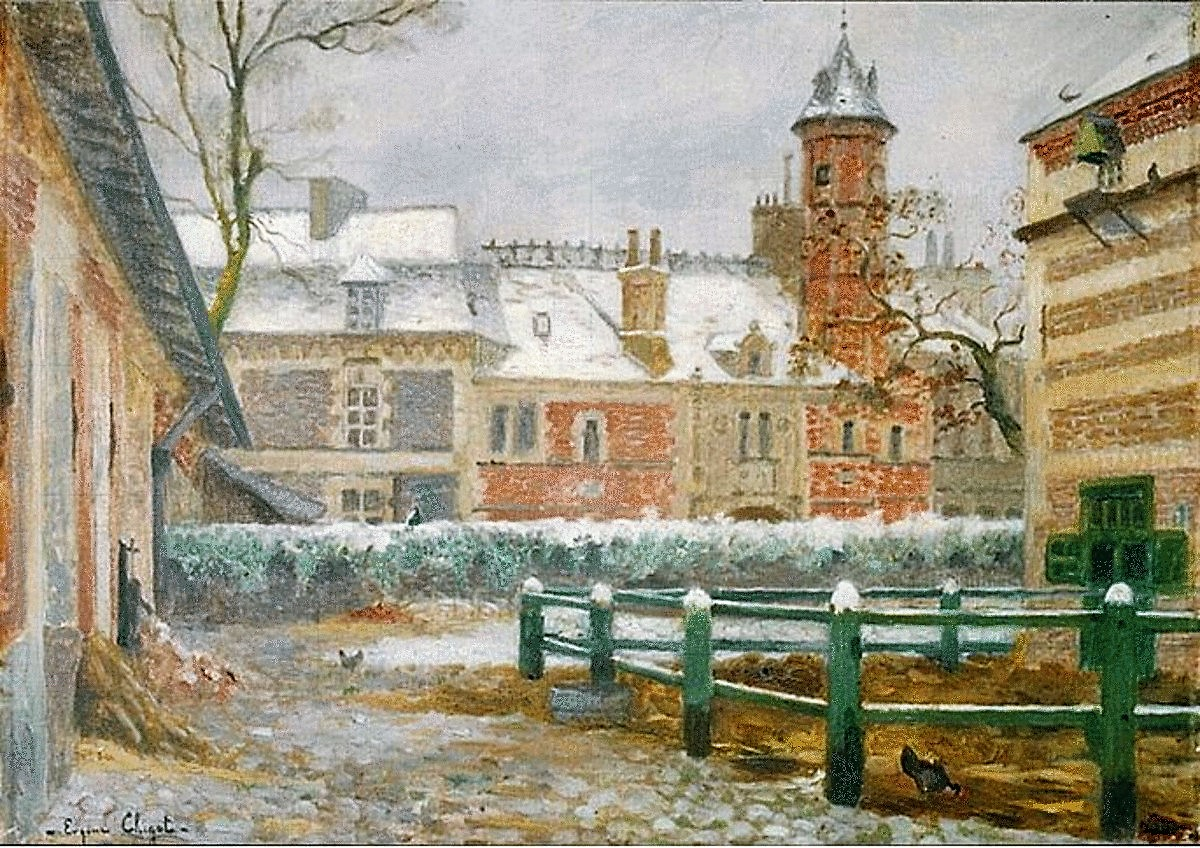
Château d'Aubry du Hainaut by Eugène Chigot, painted c.1905. Musée d'Orsay

=== Arrondissement of Valenciennes ===
Château d'Aubry du Hainaut in Aubry-du-Hainaut
Château de Bouchain in Bouchain
Château de l'Hermitage in Condé-sur-l'Escaut
Château de Bailleul in Condé-sur-l'Escaut
Château du Loir in Sars-et-Rosières
Château Desandrouin in Valenciennes

== Pas-de-Calais ==
=== Arrondissement of Arras ===
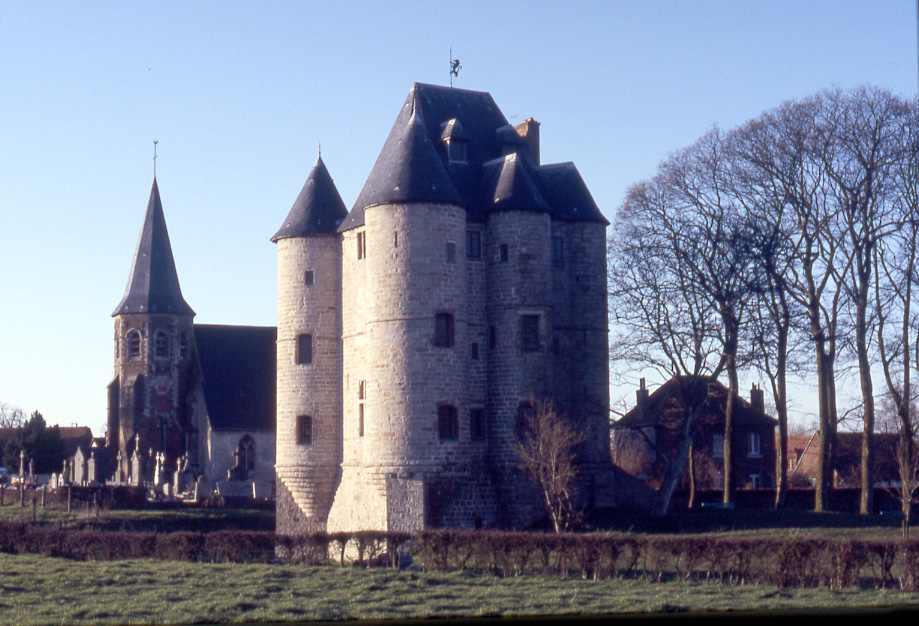
Donjon de Bours

Château de Barly in Barly
Donjon de Bours in Bours
Château de Couin in Couin
Château de Duisans in Duisans
Château de Grand-Rullecourt in Grand-Rullecourt
Château de Pas-en-Artois in Pas-en-Artois
Château de Tramecourt in Tramecourt
Château de Villers-Châtel in Villers-Châtel
Château de Saulty in Saulty
Château de Hendecourt in Hendecourt-les-Cagnicourt

=== Arrondissement of Béthune ===
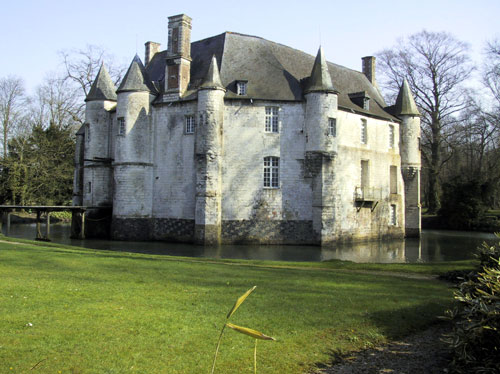
Château de Créminil

Château de Beaulieu in Busnes
Château de Quesnoy in Busnes
Château de La Buissière in Bruay-la-Buissière
Château de Créminil in Estrée-Blanche
Château de Liettres in Liettres
Château d'Olhain in Fresnicourt-le-Dolmen
Manoir de la Besvre in Witternesse

=== Arrondissement of Boulogne-sur-Mer ===
Fort Mahon in Ambleteuse
Château de Boulogne-sur-Mer in Boulogne-sur-Mer
Château d'Hardelot in Neufchâtel-Hardelot
Château de Pont-de-Briques in Saint-Léonard
Château d'Hesdin-l'Abbé or Hôtel Cléry in Hesdin-l'Abbé
Château de Recq in Recques-sur-Course by the architect Giraud Sannier

=== Arrondissement of Calais ===
Citadelle de Calais in Calais
Fort Risban in Calais
Château de la Bien-Assise in Guînes

=== Arrondissement of Montreuil ===
Château royal-citadelle in Montreuil
Château de Rosamel in Frencq
Château du Valivon in Campagne les Hesdin

=== Arrondissement of Saint-Omer ===
Château de Clarques in Clarques
Château de Cocove in Recques-sur-Hem
Château de Laprée in Quiestède
Château de Draëck in Zutkerque

== See also ==
- List of castles in France
