= Barlin =

Barlin or Bärlin may refer to:

== People ==
- Jorge Barlin (1850–1909), Filipino bishop
- Stefan Bärlin (born 1976), Swedish footballer

== Places ==
- Barlin, Pas-de-Calais, France
- Barlin Acres, Massachusetts, United States
- Canton of Barlin, Pas-de-Calais, France

== See also ==
- Berlin (disambiguation)
