= List of castles in Nord-Pas-de-Calais =

This list of castles in Nord-Pas-de-Calais is a list of medieval castles or château forts in the region in northern France.

Links in italics are links to articles in the French Wikipedia.

== Nord ==
Name	Date	Condition	Image	Ownership / Access	Notes
Château d'Esnes	15th century	Reconstructed			Reconstructed 18th century.
Château de Montmonrency		Fragment			Farm.
Château de Nicolas d'Avesnes	12th century	Ruins			

== Pas-de-Calais ==
Name	Date	Condition	Image	Ownership / Access	Notes
Château de Boulogne-sur-Mer	13-15th century	Intact		Ville de Boulogne	Houses the Boulogne museum.
Donjon de Bours		Reconstructed			
Château de La Buissière	1310	Ruins			
Château de Créminil	15th century	Intact			Surviving drawbridge.
Fort Risban (Calais)	14th century	Ruins			
Château d'Hardelot	19th century	Intact			Completed at the beginning of the twentieth century on the foundations of a 13th-century castle.
Château de Liettres	15th century	Rebuilt			Remains incorporated into later building.
Château d'Olhain	15th century	Intact			Private

== See also ==
- List of castles in France
- List of châteaux in France
