= Blessy (disambiguation) =

Blessy is the mononym of Indian film director and screenwriter Blessy Ipe Thomas.

Blessy may also refer to:

- Blessy, Pas-de-Calais, France, a commune
- Blessy Kurien (born 1991), Indian actress known for her roles in Malayalam-language television serials
- Monisha Blessy (born 1999), Indian actress in Tamil films and television
