= Canton of Béthune-Nord =

Former administrative unit in northern France

Coordinates: 50°32′21″N 2°36′26″E

The Canton of Béthune-Nord was one of the 14 cantons of the arrondissement of Béthune, in the Pas-de-Calais department, in northern France. It had 22,048 inhabitants in 2012. It was disbanded following the French canton reorganisation which came into effect in March 2015.
