= Canton of Houdain =

Canton in Pas-de-Calais, France

Coordinates: 50°26′02″N 2°33′03″E

The Canton of Houdain was one of the 14 cantons of the arrondissement of Béthune, in the Pas-de-Calais department, in northern France. It had 20,382 inhabitants in 2012. It was disbanded following the French canton reorganisation which came into effect in March 2015.
