= Canton of Aire-sur-la-Lys =

Coordinates: 50°39′53″N 2°18′41″E

Aire-sur-la-Lys
- Canton
- Location of Aire-sur-la-Lys within the department
- Country: France
- Region: Hauts-de-France
- Department: Pas-de-Calais
- No. of communes: {{{nbcomm}}}
- Area: 124.29 km^{2} (47.99 sq mi)
- Population (2023): 29,484
  - Density: 237.22/km^{2} (614.40/sq mi)
- INSEE code: 62 01

The canton of Aire-sur-la-Lys is a canton situated in the department of the Pas-de-Calais and in the Hauts-de-France region of northern France.

== Composition ==
At the French canton reorganisation which came into effect in March 2015, the canton was expanded from 14 to 17 communes:

- Aire-sur-la-Lys (Ariën)
- Blessy
- Estrée-Blanche (Strate)
- Guarbecque (Gaverbeke)
- Isbergues (Iberge)
- Lambres-lez-Aire
- Liettres (Liste)
- Ligny-lès-Aire
- Linghem
- Mazinghem
- Quernes (Kernes)
- Rely
- Rombly
- Roquetoire (Rokesdorn)
- Saint-Hilaire-Cottes
- Witternesse (Witernes)
- Wittes (Witteke)

== Population ==
Historical population
Year	Pop.	±% p.a.
2013	30,083	—
2018	29,653	−0.29%
Source: INSEE

== See also ==
- Cantons of Pas-de-Calais
- Communes of Pas-de-Calais
- Arrondissements of the Pas-de-Calais department
