= Canton of Cambrin =

Coordinates: 50°31′02″N 2°44′45″E

The Canton of Cambrin was one of the 14 cantons of the arrondissement of Béthune, in the Pas-de-Calais department, in northern France. It had 20,403 inhabitants in 2012. It was disbanded following the French canton reorganisation which came into effect in March 2015.
