= Canton of Divion =

Coordinates: 50°29′15″N 2°29′57″E

The Canton of Divion was one of the 14 cantons of the arrondissement of Béthune in the Pas-de-Calais department in northern France. It had 18,117 inhabitants in 2012. It was disbanded following the French canton reorganisation which came into effect in March 2015.
