= Febvin-Palfart =

- Commune
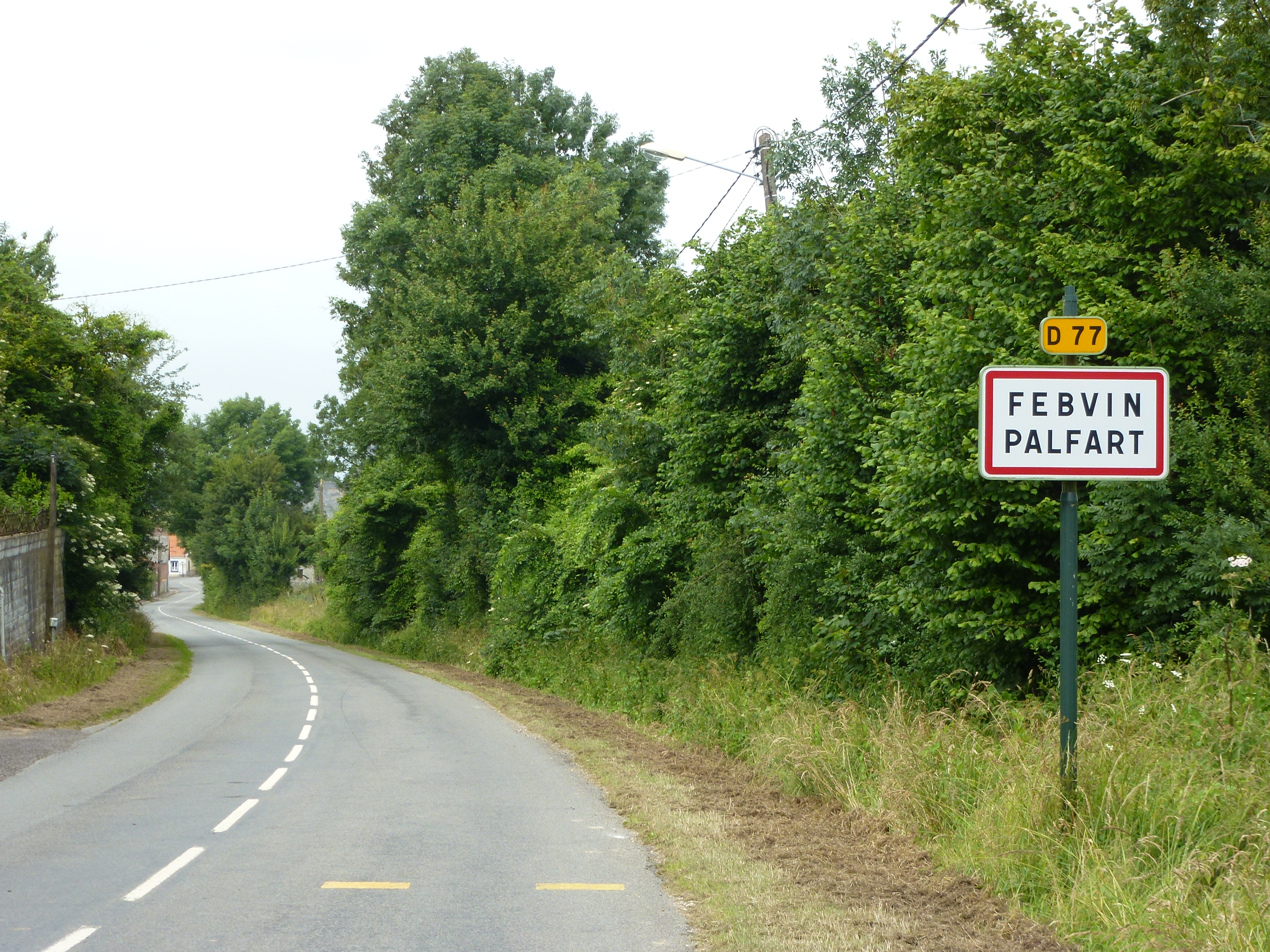
- The road into Febvin-Palfart

- Coat of arms
- Location of Febvin-Palfart
- Location within France Location within Hauts-de-France
- Coordinates: 50°32′20″N 2°18′58″E
- Country: France
- Region: Hauts-de-France
- Department: Pas-de-Calais
- Arrondissement: Saint-Omer
- Canton: Fruges
- Intercommunality: Pays de Saint-Omer

Government
  - Mayor (2020–2026): Jean-Luc Evrard
- Area^{1}: 14.51 km^{2} (5.60 sq mi)
- Elevation: 125 m (410 ft)
- Highest elevation: 196 m (643 ft)
- Lowest elevation: 87 m (285 ft)
- Population (2023): 604
  - Density: 41.6/km^{2} (108/sq mi)
- Time zone: UTC+01:00 (CET)
  - Summer (DST): UTC+02:00 (CEST)
- INSEE/Postal code: 62327 /62960
- ^{1} French Land Register data, which excludes lakes, ponds, glaciers > 1 km^{2} (0.386 sq mi or 247 acres) and river estuaries.

Febvin-Palfart is a commune in the Pas-de-Calais department in the Hauts-de-France region of France 14 miles (22 km) south of Saint-Omer.

It is surrounded by the communes Westrehem, Fontaine-lès-Hermans and Fléchin. It is 18 km northwest of Bruay-la-Buissière, the largest nearby city.

== Population ==
Historical population
Year	Pop.	±% p.a.
1968	653	—
1975	612	−0.92%
1982	552	−1.46%
1990	512	−0.94%
1999	497	−0.33%
2007	501	+0.10%
2012	560	+2.25%
2017	600	+1.39%
2023	604	+0.11%
Source: INSEE

== See also ==
- Communes of the Pas-de-Calais department
