= Guarbecque =

Guarbecque Gaverbeke
- Commune
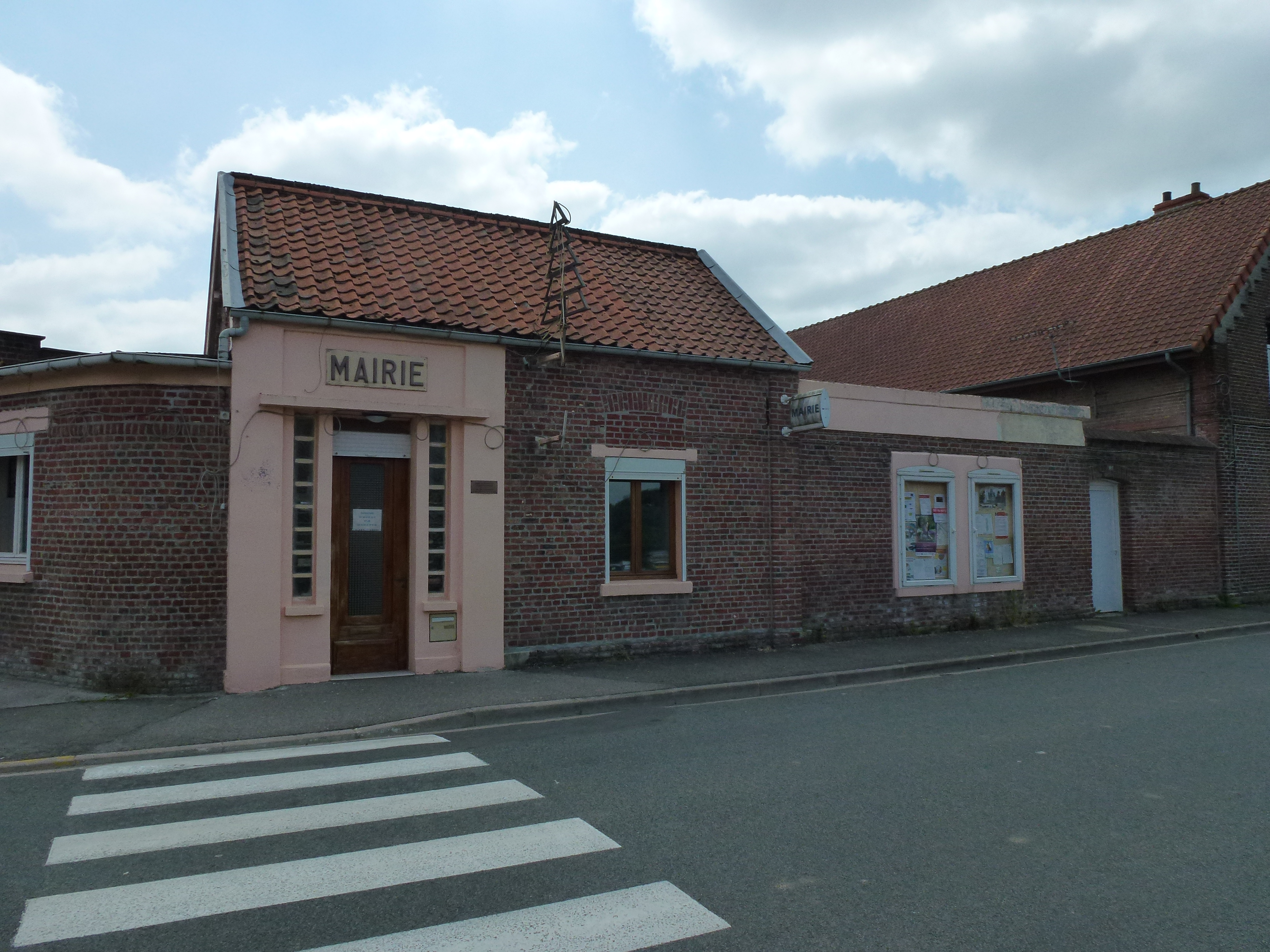
- The town hall of Guarbecque

- Coat of arms
- Location of Guarbecque
- Location within France Location within Hauts-de-France
- Coordinates: 50°36′41″N 2°29′25″E
- Country: France
- Region: Hauts-de-France
- Department: Pas-de-Calais
- Arrondissement: Béthune
- Canton: Aire-sur-la-Lys
- Intercommunality: CA Béthune-Bruay, Artois-Lys Romane

Government
  - Mayor (2020–2026): Didier Depaeuw
- Area^{1}: 5.46 km^{2} (2.11 sq mi)
- Elevation: 19 m (62 ft)
- Highest elevation: 22 m (72 ft)
- Lowest elevation: 16 m (52 ft)
- Population (2023): 1,381
  - Density: 253/km^{2} (655/sq mi)
- Time zone: UTC+01:00 (CET)
  - Summer (DST): UTC+02:00 (CEST)
- INSEE/Postal code: 62391 /62330
- ^{1} French Land Register data, which excludes lakes, ponds, glaciers > 1 km^{2} (0.386 sq mi or 247 acres) and river estuaries.

Guarbecque (French pronunciation: [ɡaʁbɛk]; Picard: Guérbécque; West Flemish: Gaverbeke) is a commune in the Pas-de-Calais department in the Hauts-de-France region of France about 9 miles (14 km) north of Béthune and 28 miles (45 km) west of Lille. The Canal d'Aire and the Guarbecque stream flow through the commune.

== Population ==
Historical population
Year	Pop.	±% p.a.
1968	1,171	—
1975	1,270	+1.17%
1982	1,373	+1.12%
1990	1,299	−0.69%
1999	1,268	−0.27%
2007	1,394	+1.19%
2012	1,420	+0.37%
2017	1,425	+0.07%
2023	1,381	−0.52%
Source: INSEE

== See also ==
- Communes of the Pas-de-Calais department
