= Arboretum d'Olhain =

Botanical garden in France

Coordinates: 50.44°N 2.574°E

The Arboretum d'Olhain is a 2 hectare arboretum located in the Forêt Domaniale d'Olhain near Olhain, Fresnicourt-le-Dolmen, Pas-de-Calais, Nord-Pas-de-Calais, France. It is open daily without charge.

== See also ==
- List of botanical gardens in France
- National Forest (France)
