= Wittes =

Wittes Witteke
- Commune
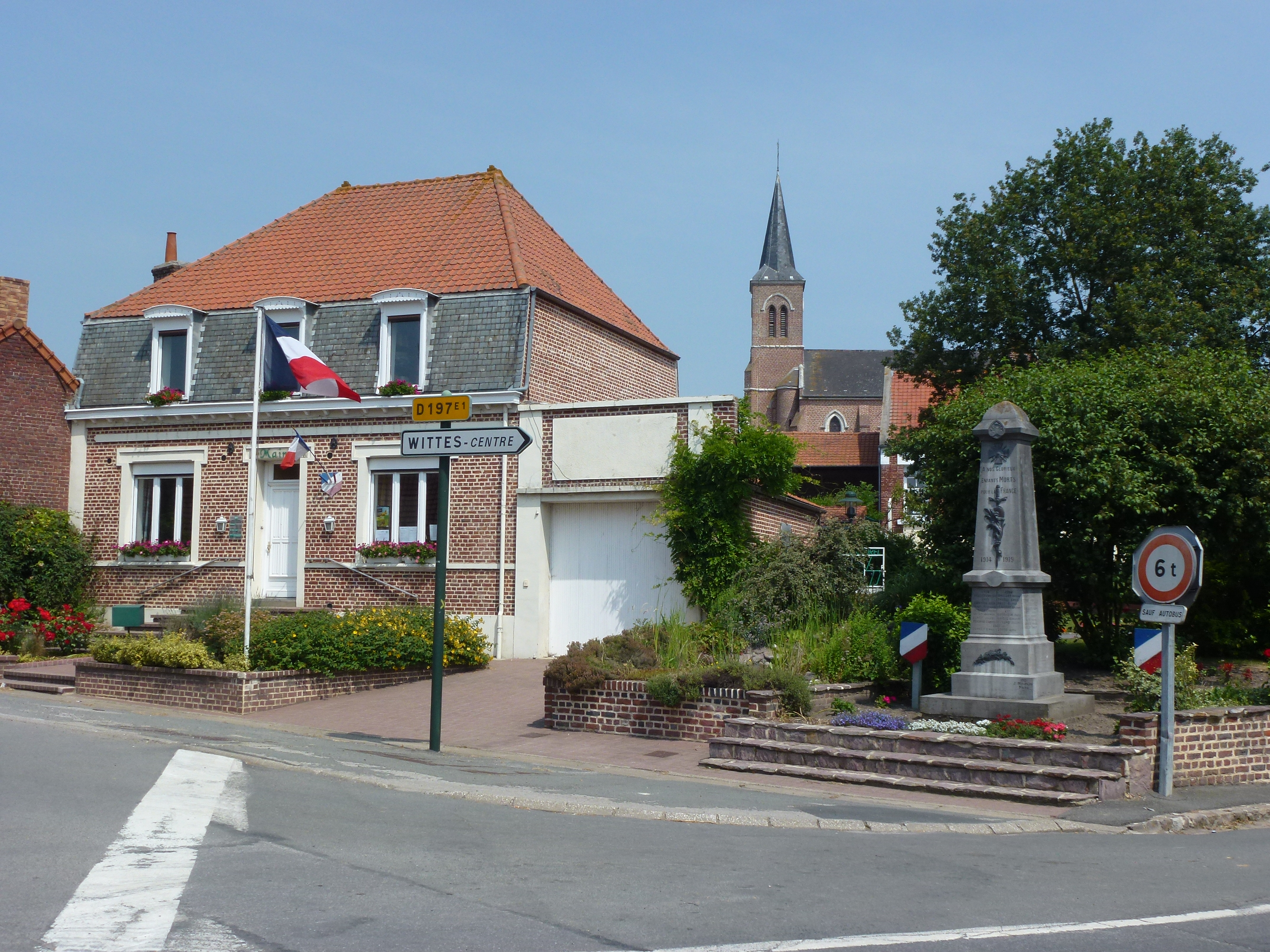
- The town hall and monument to the dead of Wittes

- Coat of arms
- Location of Wittes
- Location within France Location within Hauts-de-France
- Coordinates: 50°40′13″N 2°23′33″E
- Country: France
- Region: Hauts-de-France
- Department: Pas-de-Calais
- Arrondissement: Saint-Omer
- Canton: Aire-sur-la-Lys
- Intercommunality: Pays de Saint-Omer

Government
  - Mayor (2020–2026): Pascal Danvin
- Area^{1}: 3.92 km^{2} (1.51 sq mi)
- Elevation: 21 m (69 ft)
- Highest elevation: 41 m (135 ft)
- Lowest elevation: 17 m (56 ft)
- Population (2023): 973
  - Density: 248/km^{2} (643/sq mi)
- Time zone: UTC+01:00 (CET)
  - Summer (DST): UTC+02:00 (CEST)
- INSEE/Postal code: 62901 /62120
- ^{1} French Land Register data, which excludes lakes, ponds, glaciers > 1 km^{2} (0.386 sq mi or 247 acres) and river estuaries.

Wittes (French pronunciation: [wit]; West Flemish: Witteke) is a commune in the Pas-de-Calais department in the Hauts-de-France region of France 9 miles (14 km) southeast of Saint-Omer, on the banks of the small river Melde, a tributary of the Lys.

== Population ==
Historical population
Year	Pop.	±% p.a.
1968	382	—
1975	389	+0.26%
1982	434	+1.58%
1990	572	+3.51%
1999	687	+2.06%
2007	813	+2.13%
2012	870	+1.36%
2017	961	+2.01%
2023	973	+0.21%
Source: INSEE

== See also ==
- Communes of the Pas-de-Calais department
