= Canton of Béthune-Est =

Coordinates: 50°33′21″N 2°40′09″E

The Canton of Béthune-Est was one of the 14 cantons of the arrondissement of Béthune, in the Pas-de-Calais department, in northern France. It had 21,720 inhabitants in 2012. It was disbanded following the French canton reorganisation which came into effect in March 2015.
