= Ligny-lès-Aire =

- Commune
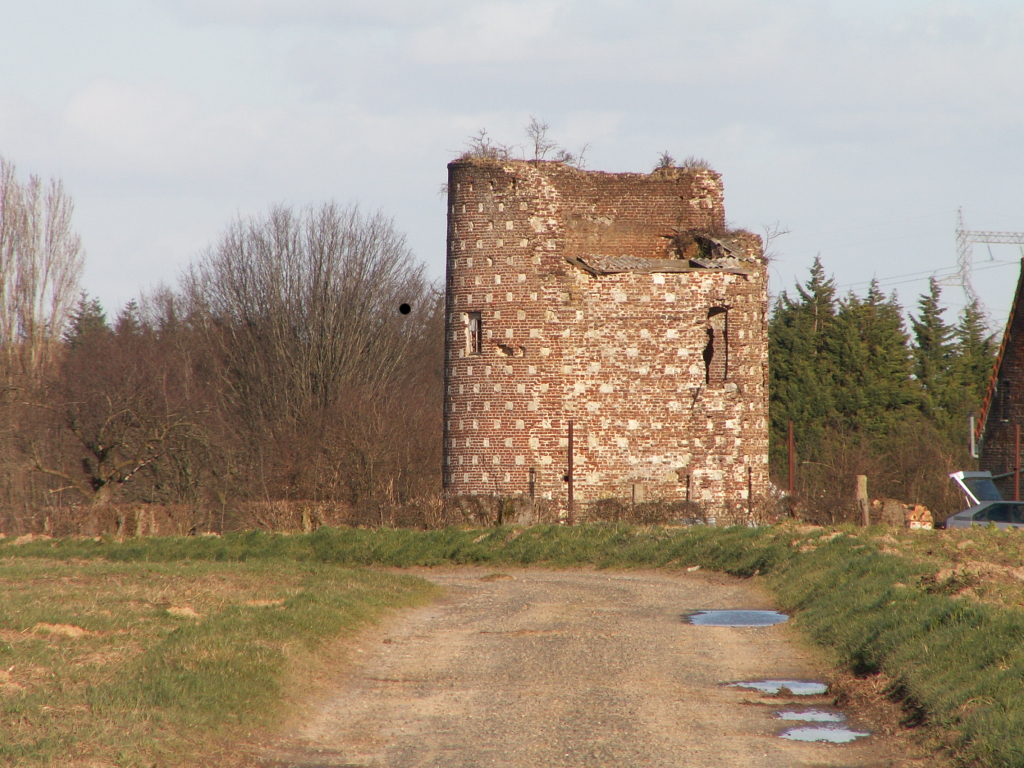
- Ruins of the windmill

- Coat of arms
- Location of Ligny-lès-Aire
- Location within France Location within Hauts-de-France
- Coordinates: 50°33′26″N 2°20′48″E
- Country: France
- Region: Hauts-de-France
- Department: Pas-de-Calais
- Arrondissement: Béthune
- Canton: Aire-sur-la-Lys
- Intercommunality: Béthune-Bruay, Artois-Lys Romane

Government
  - Mayor (2020–2026): Alain Sgard
- Area^{1}: 8.04 km^{2} (3.10 sq mi)
- Elevation: 180 m (590 ft)
- Highest elevation: 132 m (433 ft)
- Lowest elevation: 52 m (171 ft)
- Population (2023): 565
  - Density: 70.3/km^{2} (182/sq mi)
- Time zone: UTC+01:00 (CET)
  - Summer (DST): UTC+02:00 (CEST)
- INSEE/Postal code: 62512 /62960
- ^{1} French Land Register data, which excludes lakes, ponds, glaciers > 1 km^{2} (0.386 sq mi or 247 acres) and river estuaries.

Ligny-lès-Aire is a commune in the Pas-de-Calais department in the Hauts-de-France region of France.

== Geography ==
Ligny-lès-Aire is situated some 13 miles (21 km) northwest of Béthune and 36 miles (58 km) west of Lille, on the D341, D90e and D90 roads.

It is surrounded by the communes Westrehem, Rely and Auchy-au-Bois. Ligny-lès-Aire is located 20 km northwest of Bruay-la-Buissière, the largest city nearby.

== Population ==
Historical population
Year	Pop.	±% p.a.
1968	536	—
1975	505	−0.85%
1982	505	+0.00%
1990	486	−0.48%
1999	505	+0.43%
2007	572	+1.57%
2012	619	+1.59%
2017	598	−0.69%
2023	565	−0.94%
Source: INSEE

== Places of interest ==
- The church of St. Pierre, dating from the sixteenth century.
- An ancient windmill.

== See also ==
- Communes of the Pas-de-Calais department
