= Canton of Laventie =

Coordinates: 50°37′42″N 2°46′19″E

The Canton of Laventie was one of the 14 cantons of the arrondissement of Béthune, in the Pas-de-Calais department, in northern France. It had 18,792 inhabitants in 2012. It was disbanded following the French canton reorganisation which came into effect in March 2015.
