= Canton of Béthune-Sud =

Coordinates: 50°31′07″N 2°35′12″E

The Canton of Béthune-Sud was one of the 14 cantons of the arrondissement of Béthune, in the Pas-de-Calais department, in northern France. It had 18,859 inhabitants in 2012. It was disbanded following the French canton reorganisation which came into effect in March 2015.
