= Rombly =

- Commune
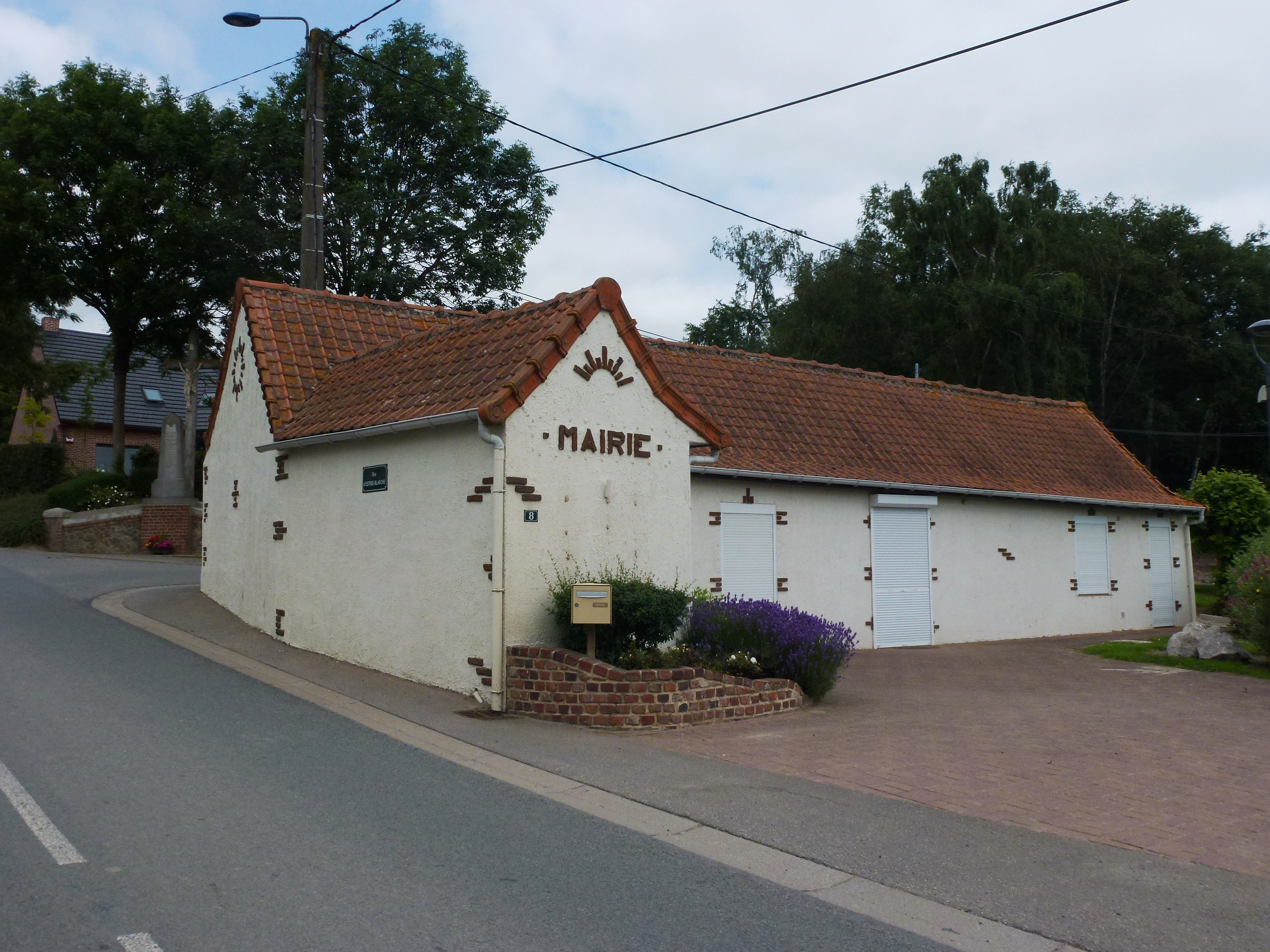
- The town hall of Rombly

- Coat of arms
- Location of Rombly
- Location within France Location within Hauts-de-France
- Coordinates: 50°35′59″N 2°23′24″E
- Country: France
- Region: Hauts-de-France
- Department: Pas-de-Calais
- Arrondissement: Béthune
- Canton: Aire-sur-la-Lys
- Intercommunality: CA Béthune-Bruay, Artois-Lys Romane

Government
  - Mayor (2020–2026): Jasmine Loison
- Area^{1}: 1.15 km^{2} (0.44 sq mi)
- Elevation: 38 m (125 ft)
- Highest elevation: 56 m (184 ft)
- Lowest elevation: 26 m (85 ft)
- Population (2023): 53
  - Density: 46/km^{2} (120/sq mi)
- Time zone: UTC+01:00 (CET)
  - Summer (DST): UTC+02:00 (CEST)
- INSEE/Postal code: 62720 /62120
- ^{1} French Land Register data, which excludes lakes, ponds, glaciers > 1 km^{2} (0.386 sq mi or 247 acres) and river estuaries.

Rombly (French pronunciation: [ʁɔ̃bli]) is a commune in the Pas-de-Calais département in the Hauts-de-France region of France about 11 miles (18 km) northwest of Béthune and 31 miles (50 km) west of Lille.

== Population ==
Historical population
Year	Pop.	±% p.a.
1968	51	—
1975	46	−1.46%
1982	56	+2.85%
1990	49	−1.66%
1999	42	−1.70%
2007	32	−3.34%
2012	48	+8.45%
2017	46	−0.85%
2023	53	+2.39%
Source: INSEE

== See also ==
- Communes of the Pas-de-Calais department
