= Barlin Acres =

Historic house in Massachusetts, United States

- U.S. National Register of Historic Places
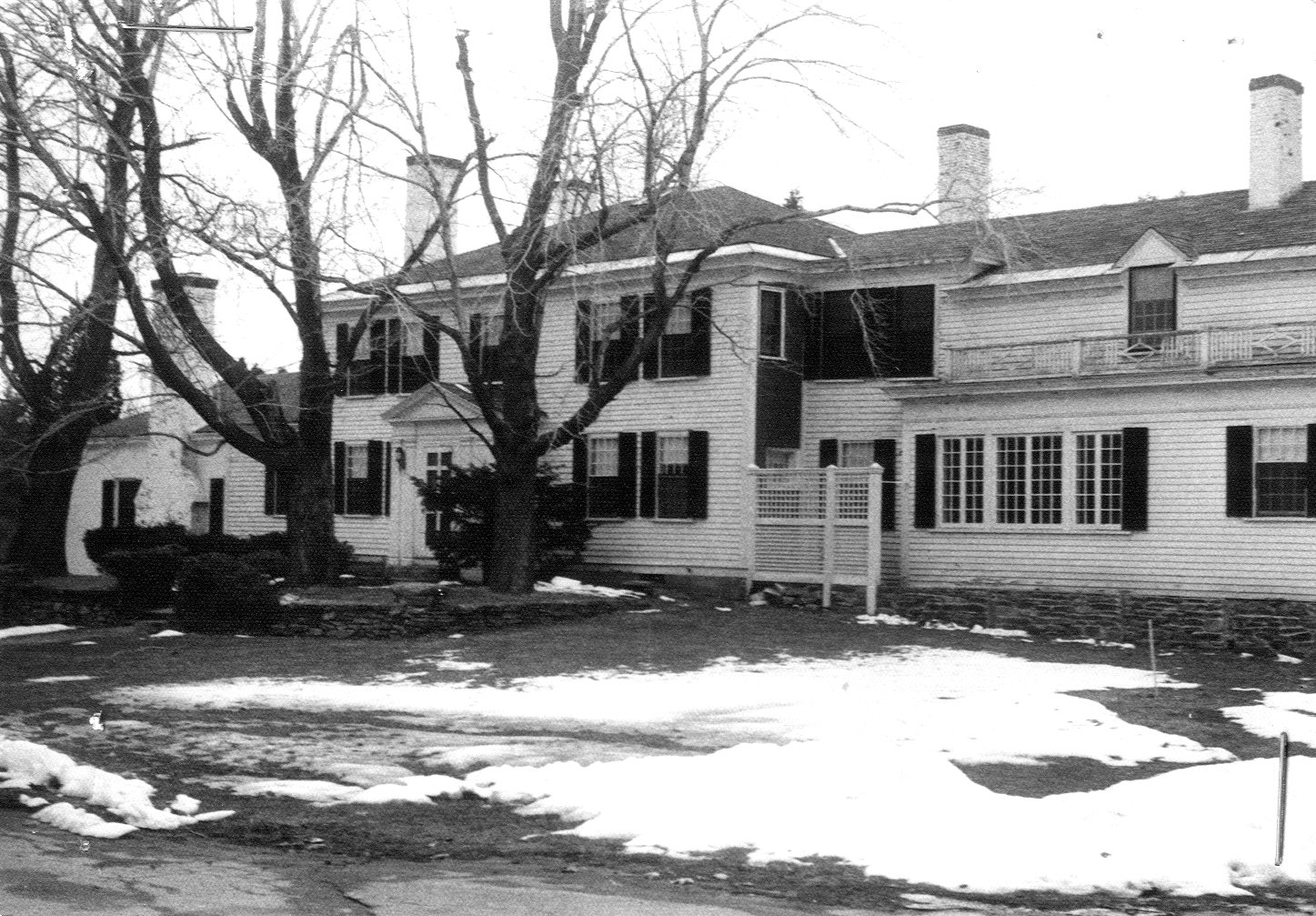
- c. 1973 photo

- Location within Massachusetts Location within the United States
- Location: 284 E. Templeton St., Boylston, Massachusetts
- Coordinates: 42°20′4″N 71°43′22″W
- Built: 1790
- Architectural style: Federal
- NRHP reference No.: 82000487
- Added to NRHP: November 26, 1982

Barlin Acres (or the Keyes-Dakin House) was an historic house located on what is now East Temple Street in Boylston, Massachusetts. Built in 1734 and eventually transformed into a summer estate house, it was home to a founder of Boylston, and a good example of colonial and Federal period architecture. The house was listed on the National Register of Historic Places on November 26, 1982. It was subsequently demolished to make way for the clubhouse of the Cyprian Keyes Golf Club, which now stands on its site. The clubhouse contains architectural elements recovered from the house, including some flooring and the 19th century Music Room.

== Description and history ==
Barlin Acres was located in central southern Boylston, on the north side of East Temple Street. It was a 2 1/2-story wood-frame structure, covered by a truncated hip roof with a balustraded center, and sheathed in wooden clapboards, except for its original side walls, which are brick. The main facade was five bays wide, with sash windows arranged symmetrically around a projecting center entrance. The entrance was framed by a Federal style surround, with pilasters rising to an entablature and fully pedimented gable. The rear of this block was sheltered by a two-story columned portico. Ells, most added in the 20th century, extended to both sides.

The area was first settled in 1718, while it was part of Shrewsbury, by Thomas Keyes, whose son Cyprian built a house on the property in 1734. Cyprian Keyes was a deacon the Shrewsbury North Precinct (later Boylston) Congregational Church, and a town selectman when Boylston was incorporated in 1743. Keyes' property was eventually acquired by George Sumner Barton and his wife, Elizabeth Trumbull Lincoln. They named the property "Barlin Acres" by combining parts of their last names, and expanded the house. One of their notable additions was a room that was disassembled in England, brought to the estate, and reassembled as part of the house, and used by them as a music room. The property was acquired in 1973 by the Roman Catholic Diocese of Worcester, which established a retreat on the grounds. The property was later sold for conversion to the golf course. As part of that conversion, the house was largely demolished, with some portions retained for use in the clubhouse.

== See also ==
- National Register of Historic Places listings in Worcester County, Massachusetts
