= Westrehem =

- Commune
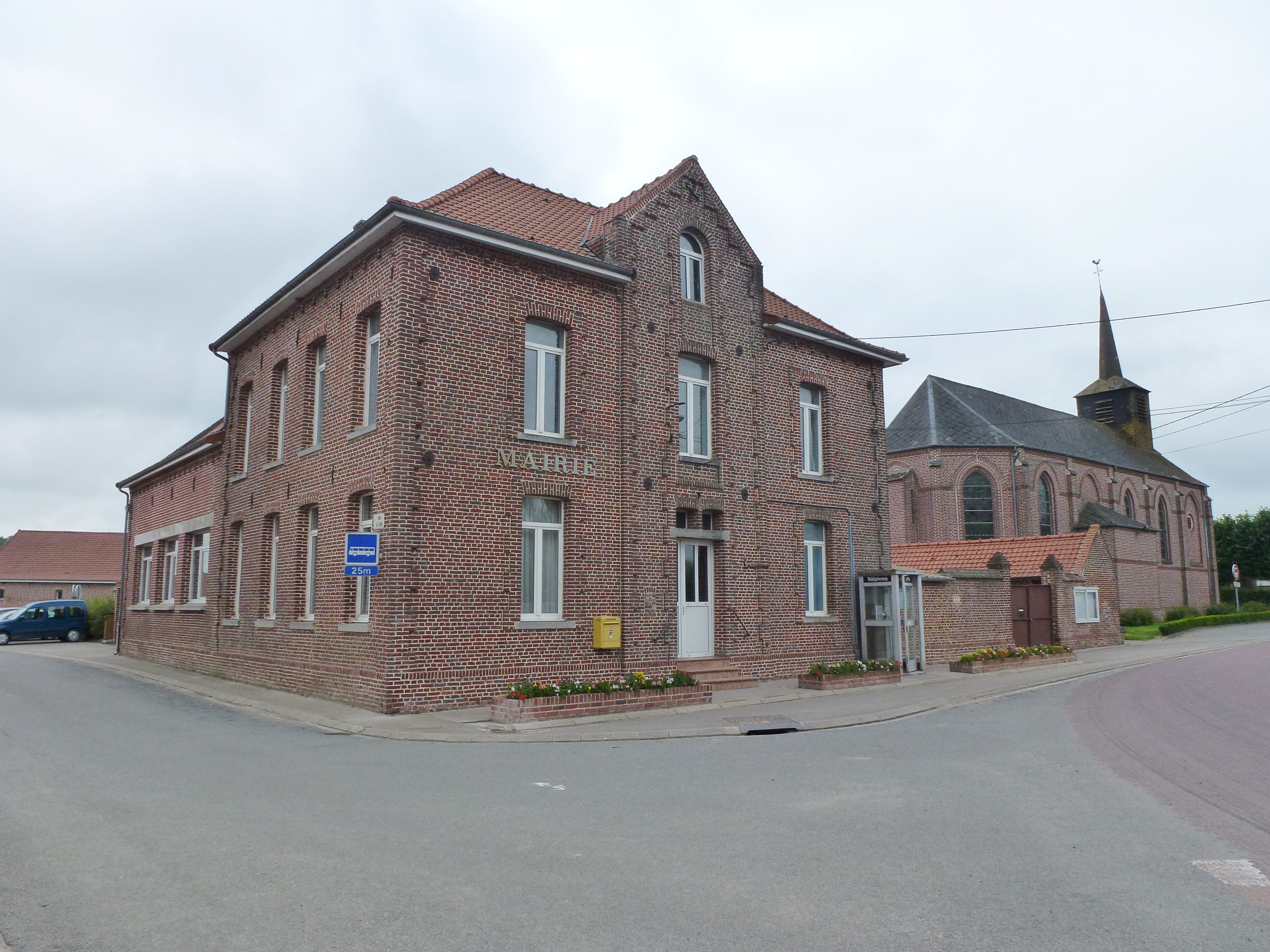
- The town hall and church of Westrehem

- Coat of arms
- Location of Westrehem
- Location within France Location within Hauts-de-France
- Coordinates: 50°32′45″N 2°20′46″E
- Country: France
- Region: Hauts-de-France
- Department: Pas-de-Calais
- Arrondissement: Béthune
- Canton: Lillers
- Intercommunality: Béthune-Bruay, Artois-Lys Romane

Government
  - Mayor (2020–2026): Gilles Tailly
- Area^{1}: 2.97 km^{2} (1.15 sq mi)
- Elevation: 100 m (330 ft)
- Highest elevation: 132 m (433 ft)
- Lowest elevation: 90 m (300 ft)
- Population (2023): 246
  - Density: 82.8/km^{2} (215/sq mi)
- Time zone: UTC+01:00 (CET)
  - Summer (DST): UTC+02:00 (CEST)
- INSEE/Postal code: 62885 /62960
- ^{1} French Land Register data, which excludes lakes, ponds, glaciers > 1 km^{2} (0.386 sq mi or 247 acres) and river estuaries.

Westrehem (French pronunciation: [wɛstʁ(ə)ɛm]) is a commune in the Pas-de-Calais department in the Hauts-de-France region of France about 12 miles (19 km) west of Béthune and 34 miles (55 km) southwest of Lille.

It is surrounded by the communes of Ligny-lès-Aire, Fontaine-lès-Hermans and Febvin-Palfart. Westrehem is located 16 km northwest of Bruay-la-Buissière, the largest nearby city.

== Heraldry ==
Arms of Westrehem	The arms of Westrehem are blazoned : Barry Or and azure, in chief in fess 3 annulets gules. (Wulverdinghe and Westrehem use the same arms.)

== Population ==
Historical population
Year	Pop.	±% p.a.
1968	217	—
1975	183	−2.41%
1982	189	+0.46%
1990	230	+2.48%
1999	230	+0.00%
2007	227	−0.16%
2012	212	−1.36%
2017	244	+2.85%
2023	246	+0.14%
Source: INSEE

== See also ==
- Communes of the Pas-de-Calais department
