= Quernes =

Quernes Kernes
- Commune
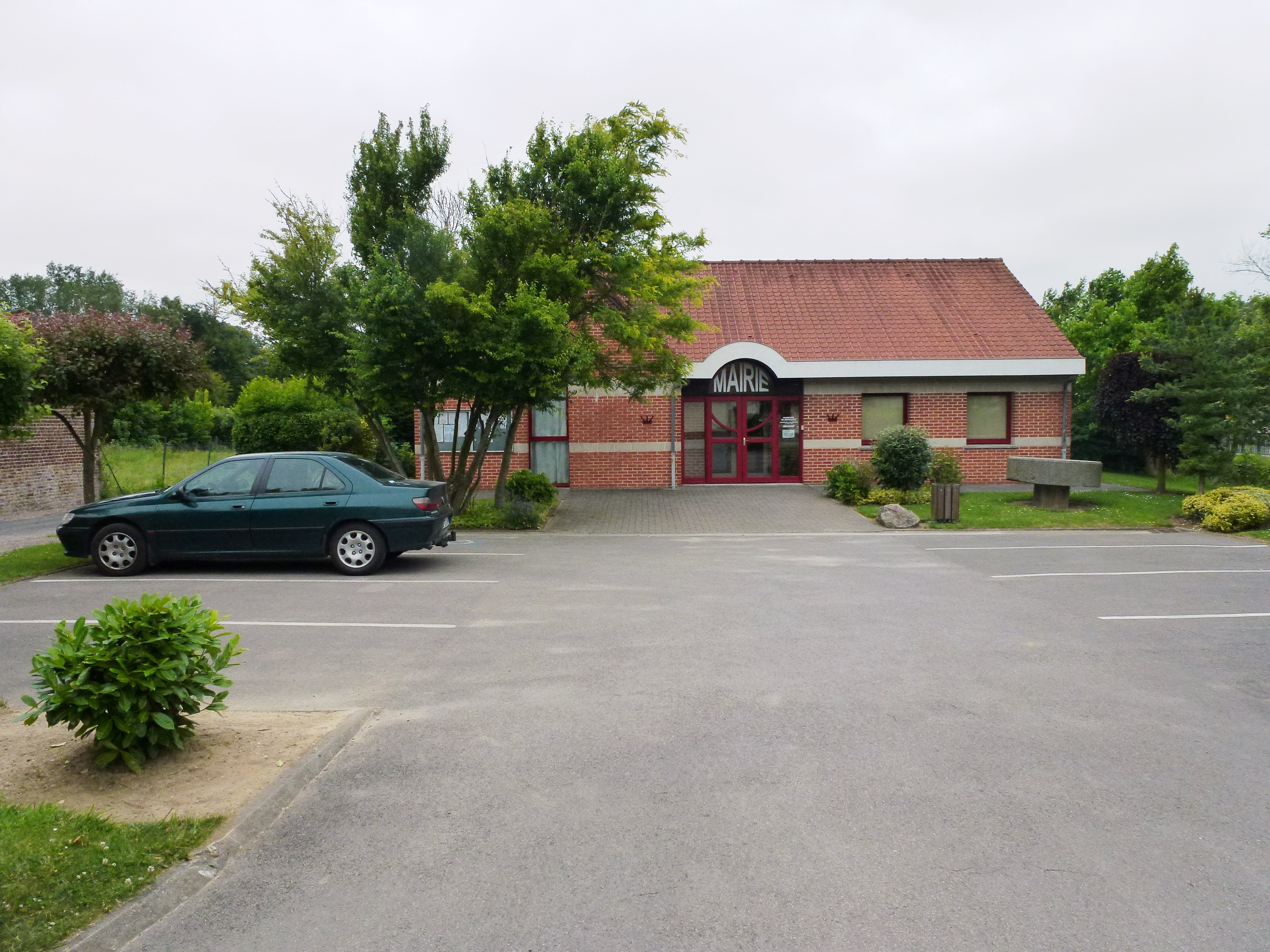
- The town hall of Quernes

- Coat of arms
- Location of Quernes
- Location within France Location within Hauts-de-France
- Coordinates: 50°36′21″N 2°22′02″E
- Country: France
- Region: Hauts-de-France
- Department: Pas-de-Calais
- Arrondissement: Béthune
- Canton: Aire-sur-la-Lys
- Intercommunality: CA Béthune-Bruay, Artois-Lys Romane

Government
  - Mayor (2020–2026): Patrick Verwaerde
- Area^{1}: 2.75 km^{2} (1.06 sq mi)
- Elevation: 28 m (92 ft)
- Highest elevation: 71 m (233 ft)
- Lowest elevation: 25 m (82 ft)
- Population (2023): 420
  - Density: 150/km^{2} (400/sq mi)
- Time zone: UTC+01:00 (CET)
  - Summer (DST): UTC+02:00 (CEST)
- INSEE/Postal code: 62676 /62120
- ^{1} French Land Register data, which excludes lakes, ponds, glaciers > 1 km^{2} (0.386 sq mi or 247 acres) and river estuaries.

Quernes (French pronunciation: [kɛʁn]; West Flemish: Kernes) is a commune in the Pas-de-Calais department in the Hauts-de-France region of France 12 miles (19 km) northwest of Béthune and 32 miles (51 km) west of Lille. The inhabitants are called the Quernois in French. The commune is part of the Communauté d'agglomération de Béthune-Bruay, Artois-Lys Romane.

== Population ==
Historical population
Year	Pop.	±% p.a.
1968	324	—
1975	332	+0.35%
1982	360	+1.16%
1990	466	+3.28%
1999	469	+0.07%
2007	453	−0.43%
2012	479	+1.12%
2017	458	−0.89%
2023	420	−1.43%
Source: INSEE

== See also ==
- Communes of the Pas-de-Calais department
