= Lambres-lez-Aire =

- Commune
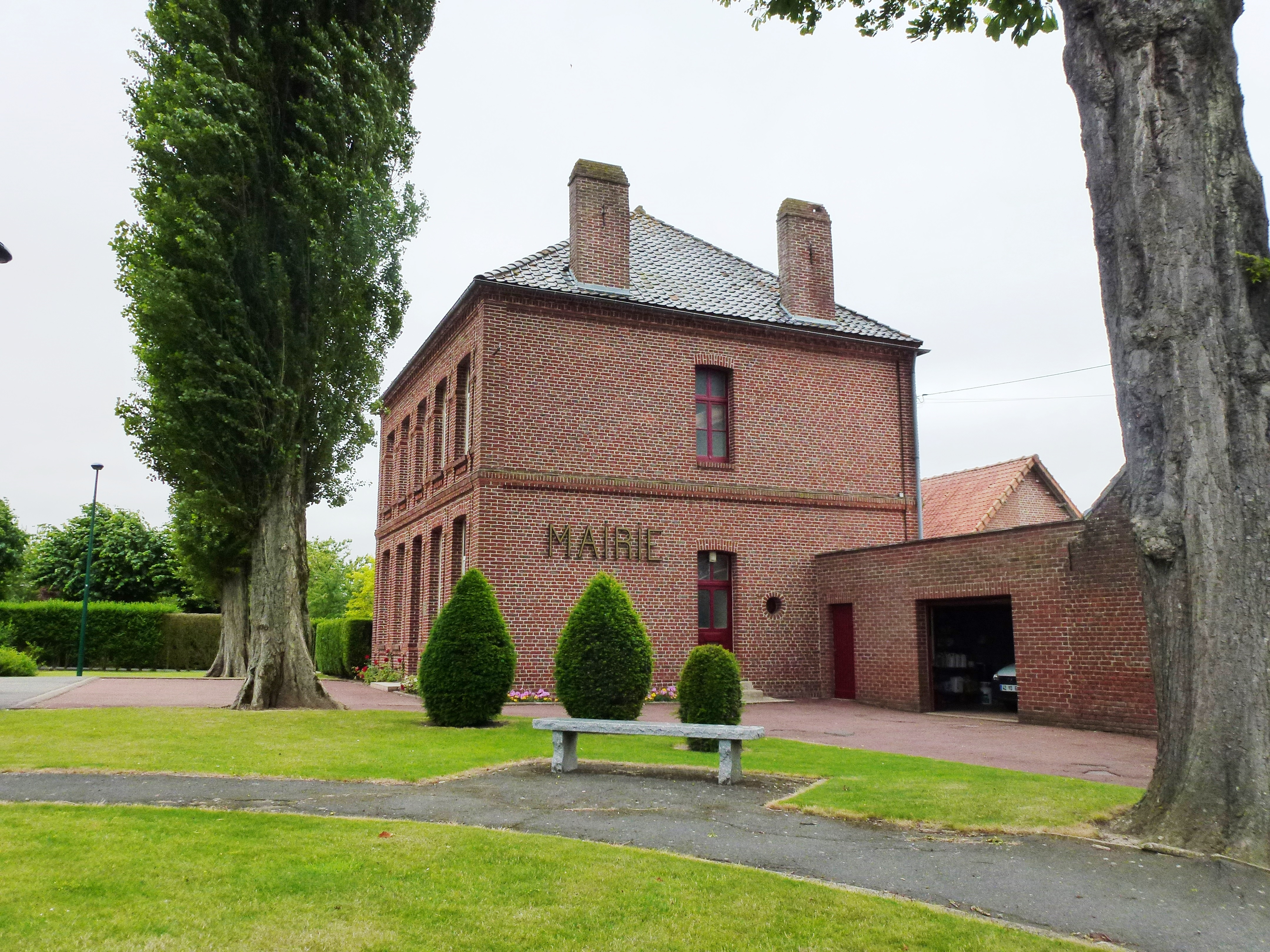
- The town hall of Lambres-lez-Aire

- Coat of arms
- Location of Lambres-lez-Aire
- Location within France Location within Hauts-de-France
- Coordinates: 50°37′03″N 2°23′51″E
- Country: France
- Region: Hauts-de-France
- Department: Pas-de-Calais
- Arrondissement: Béthune
- Canton: Aire-sur-la-Lys
- Intercommunality: CA Béthune-Bruay, Artois-Lys Romane

Government
  - Mayor (2020–2026): Denis Prevost
- Area^{1}: 4.37 km^{2} (1.69 sq mi)
- Elevation: 25 m (82 ft)
- Highest elevation: 49 m (161 ft)
- Lowest elevation: 18 m (59 ft)
- Population (2023): 1,070
  - Density: 245/km^{2} (634/sq mi)
- Time zone: UTC+01:00 (CET)
  - Summer (DST): UTC+02:00 (CEST)
- INSEE/Postal code: 62486 /62120
- ^{1} French Land Register data, which excludes lakes, ponds, glaciers > 1 km^{2} (0.386 sq mi or 247 acres) and river estuaries.

Lambres-lez-Aire (before 2026: Lambres, French pronunciation: [lɑ̃bʁ]; Picard: Lambes) is a commune in the Pas-de-Calais department in the Hauts-de-France region of France about 10 miles (16 km) northwest of Béthune and 30 miles (48 km) west of Lille.

== Population ==
Historical population
Year	Pop.	±% p.a.
1968	884	—
1975	892	+0.13%
1982	1,013	+1.83%
1990	1,042	+0.35%
1999	937	−1.17%
2007	1,041	+1.32%
2012	1,056	+0.29%
2017	1,061	+0.09%
2023	1,070	+0.14%
Source: INSEE

== See also ==
- Communes of the Pas-de-Calais department
