= Arrondissement of Béthune =

Coordinates: 50.53°N 2.63°E

Béthune
- Arrondissement
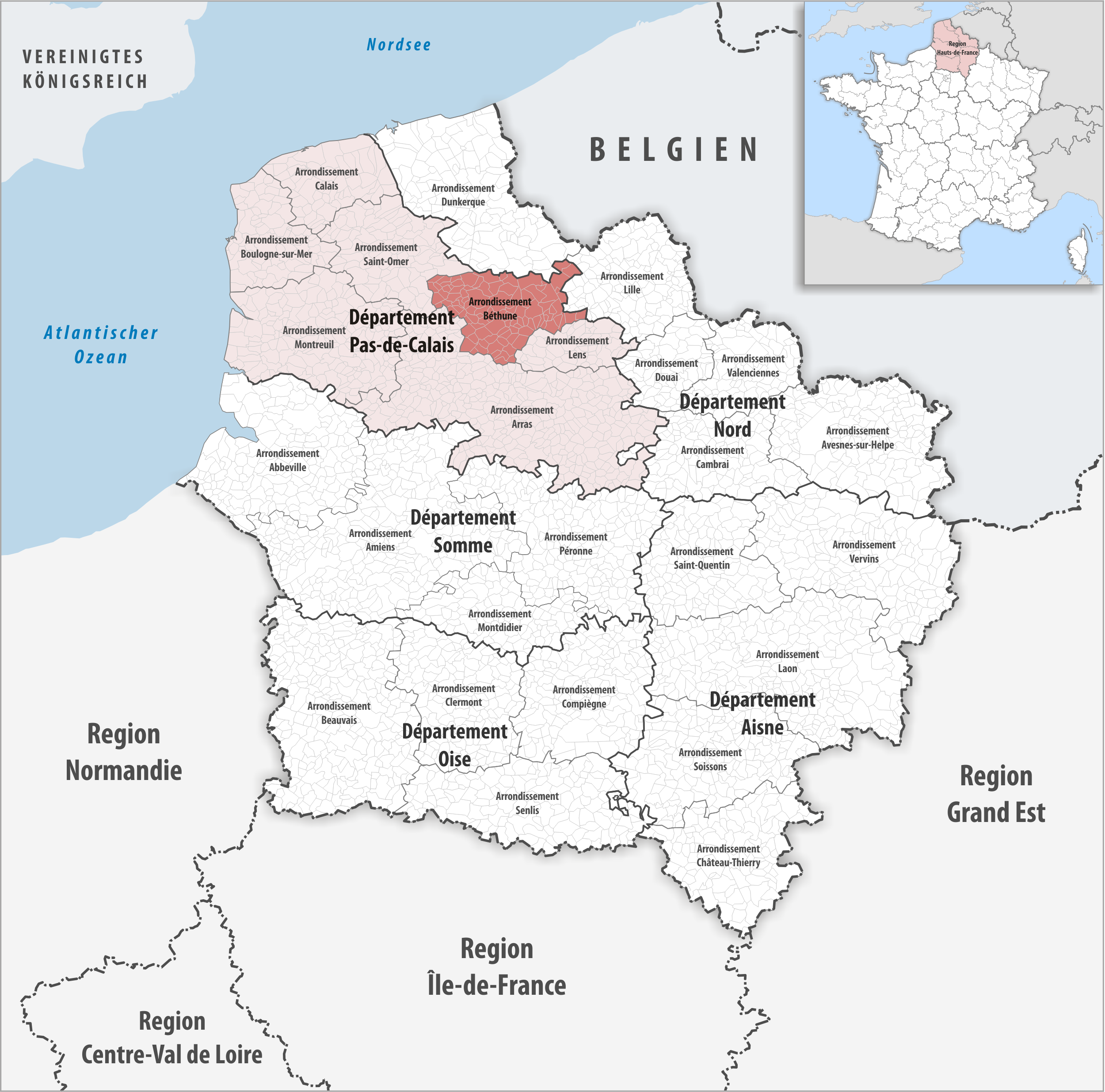
- Location within the region Hauts-de-France
- Country: France
- Region: Hauts-de-France
- Department: Pas-de-Calais
- No. of communes: {{{nbcomm}}}
- Area: 707.4 km^{2} (273.1 sq mi)
- Population (2023): 292,009
  - Density: 412.8/km^{2} (1,069/sq mi)
- INSEE code: 622

The arrondissement of Béthune is an arrondissement of France in the Pas-de-Calais department in the Hauts-de-France region. It has 104 communes. Its population is 292,114 (2021), and its area is 707.4 km^{2} (273.1 sq mi).

== Composition ==
The communes of the arrondissement of Béthune, and their INSEE codes, are:

1. Allouagne (62023)
2. Ames (62028)
3. Amettes (62029)
4. Annequin (62034)
5. Annezin (62035)
6. Auchel (62048)
7. Auchy-au-Bois (62049)
8. Auchy-les-Mines (62051)
9. Bajus (62077)
10. Barlin (62083)
11. Béthune (62119)
12. Beugin (62120)
13. Beuvry (62126)
14. Billy-Berclau (62132)
15. Blessy (62141)
16. Bourecq (62162)
17. Bruay-la-Buissière (62178)
18. Burbure (62188)
19. Busnes (62190)
20. Calonne-Ricouart (62194)
21. Calonne-sur-la-Lys (62195)
22. Camblain-Châtelain (62197)
23. Cambrin (62200)
24. Cauchy-à-la-Tour (62217)
25. Caucourt (62218)
26. Chocques (62224)
27. La Comté (62232)
28. La Couture (62252)
29. Cuinchy (62262)
30. Diéval (62269)
31. Divion (62270)
32. Douvrin (62276)
33. Drouvin-le-Marais (62278)
34. Ecquedecques (62286)
35. Essars (62310)
36. Estrée-Blanche (62313)
37. Estrée-Cauchy (62314)
38. Ferfay (62328)
39. Festubert (62330)
40. Fleurbaix (62338)
41. Fouquereuil (62349)
42. Fouquières-lès-Béthune (62350)
43. Fresnicourt-le-Dolmen (62356)
44. Gauchin-Légal (62366)
45. Givenchy-lès-la-Bassée (62373)
46. Gonnehem (62376)
47. Gosnay (62377)
48. Guarbecque (62391)
49. Haillicourt (62400)
50. Haisnes (62401)
51. Ham-en-Artois (62407)
52. Hermin (62441)
53. Hersin-Coupigny (62443)
54. Hesdigneul-lès-Béthune (62445)
55. Hinges (62454)
56. Houchin (62456)
57. Houdain (62457)
58. Isbergues (62473)
59. Labeuvrière (62479)
60. Labourse (62480)
61. Lambres-lez-Aire (62486)
62. Lapugnoy (62489)
63. Laventie (62491)
64. Lespesses (62500)
65. Lestrem (62502)
66. Lières (62508)
67. Liettres (62509)
68. Ligny-lès-Aire (62512)
69. Lillers (62516)
70. Linghem (62517)
71. Locon (62520)
72. Lorgies (62529)
73. Lozinghem (62532)
74. Maisnil-lès-Ruitz (62540)
75. Marles-les-Mines (62555)
76. Mazinghem (62564)
77. Mont-Bernanchon (62584)
78. Nœux-les-Mines (62617)
79. Neuve-Chapelle (62606)
80. Norrent-Fontes (62620)
81. Noyelles-lès-Vermelles (62626)
82. Oblinghem (62632)
83. Ourton (62642)
84. Quernes (62676)
85. Rebreuve-Ranchicourt (62693)
86. Rely (62701)
87. Richebourg (62706)
88. Robecq (62713)
89. Rombly (62720)
90. Ruitz (62727)
91. Sailly-Labourse (62735)
92. Sailly-sur-la-Lys (62736)
93. Saint-Floris (62747)
94. Saint-Hilaire-Cottes (62750)
95. Saint-Venant (62770)
96. Vaudricourt (62836)
97. Vendin-lès-Béthune (62841)
98. Vermelles (62846)
99. Verquigneul (62847)
100. Verquin (62848)
101. Vieille-Chapelle (62851)
102. Violaines (62863)
103. Westrehem (62885)
104. Witternesse (62900)

== History ==
The arrondissement of Béthune was created in 1800. The arrondissement of Lens was created in 1962 from part of the arrondissement of Béthune. At the January 2017 reorganisation of the arrondissements of Pas-de-Calais, it gained three communes from the arrondissement of Arras and one commune from the arrondissement of Lens.

As a result of the reorganisation of the cantons of France which came into effect in 2015, the borders of the cantons are no longer related to the borders of the arrondissements. The cantons of the arrondissement of Béthune were, as of January 2015:

1. Auchel
2. Barlin
3. Béthune-Est
4. Béthune-Nord
5. Béthune-Sud
6. Bruay-la-Buissière
7. Cambrin
8. Divion
9. Douvrin
10. Houdain
11. Laventie
12. Lillers
13. Nœux-les-Mines
14. Norrent-Fontes
