= Saint-Hilaire-Cottes =

- Commune
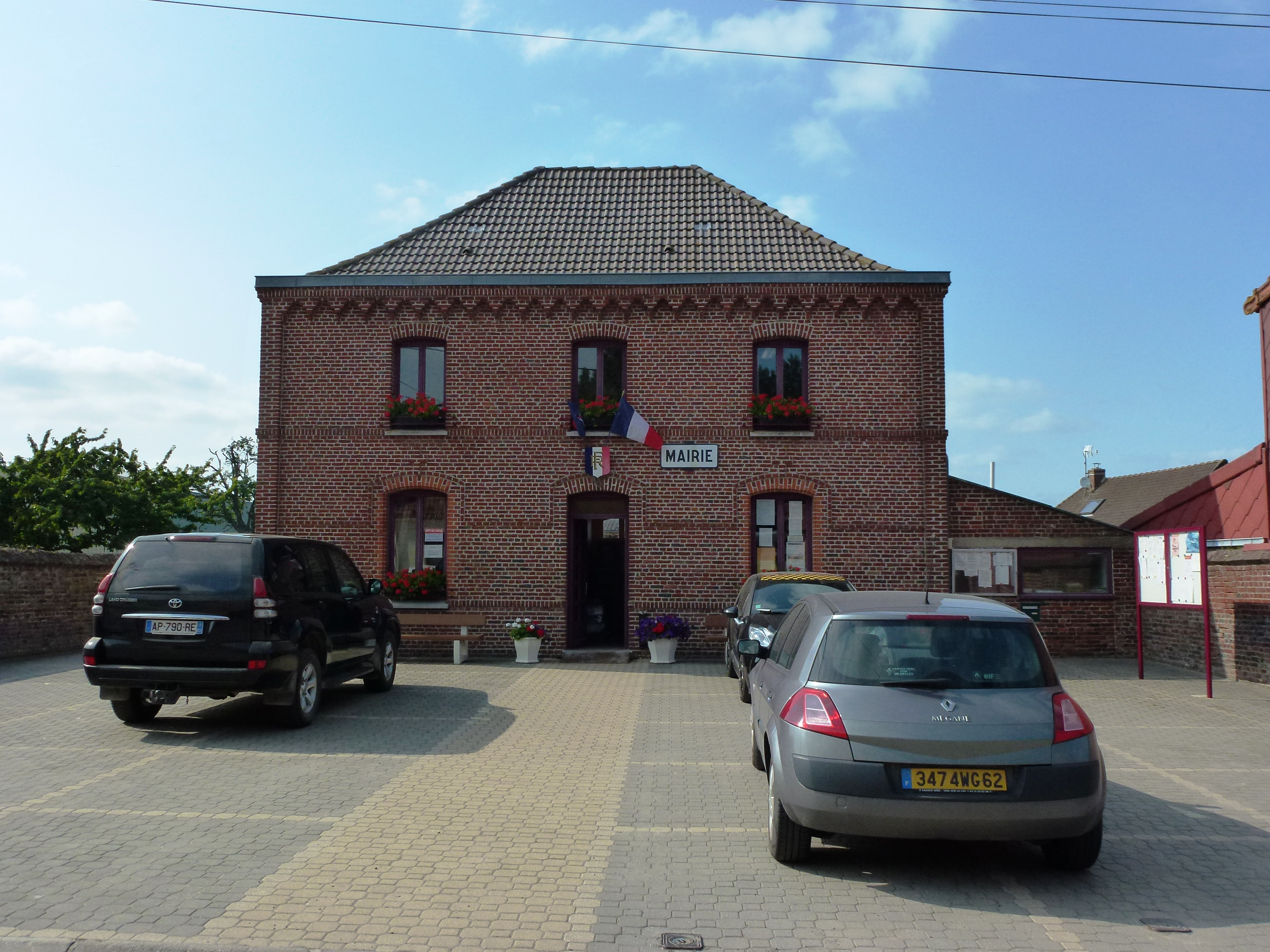
- The town hall of Saint-Hilaire-Cottes

- Coat of arms
- Location of Saint-Hilaire-Cottes
- Location within France Location within Hauts-de-France
- Coordinates: 50°34′20″N 2°24′54″E
- Country: France
- Region: Hauts-de-France
- Department: Pas-de-Calais
- Arrondissement: Béthune
- Canton: Aire-sur-la-Lys
- Intercommunality: CA Béthune-Bruay, Artois-Lys Romane

Government
  - Mayor (2020–2026): Freddy Defebvin
- Area^{1}: 7.24 km^{2} (2.80 sq mi)
- Elevation: 65 m (213 ft)
- Highest elevation: 102 m (335 ft)
- Lowest elevation: 24 m (79 ft)
- Population (2023): 830
  - Density: 110/km^{2} (300/sq mi)
- Time zone: UTC+01:00 (CET)
  - Summer (DST): UTC+02:00 (CEST)
- INSEE/Postal code: 62750 /62120
- ^{1} French Land Register data, which excludes lakes, ponds, glaciers > 1 km^{2} (0.386 sq mi or 247 acres) and river estuaries.

Saint-Hilaire-Cottes (French pronunciation: [sɛ̃.t‿ilɛʁ kɔt]) is a commune in the Pas-de-Calais department in the Hauts-de-France region of France.

== Geography ==
Saint-Hilaire-Cottes is situated some 10 miles (16 km) northwest of Béthune and 37 miles (60 km) west of Lille, at the junction of the D943 and D91 roads.

== Population ==
Historical population
Year	Pop.	±% p.a.
1968	753	—
1975	725	−0.54%
1982	752	+0.52%
1990	750	−0.03%
1999	734	−0.24%
2007	807	+1.19%
2012	822	+0.37%
2017	807	−0.37%
2023	830	+0.47%
Source: INSEE

== Places of interest ==
- The church of St. Hilaire, dating from the sixteenth century
- The church of St. Omer, at Cottes, dating from the fifteenth century
- The Commonwealth War Graves Commission graves

== See also ==
- Communes of the Pas-de-Calais department
