= Mazinghem =

- Commune
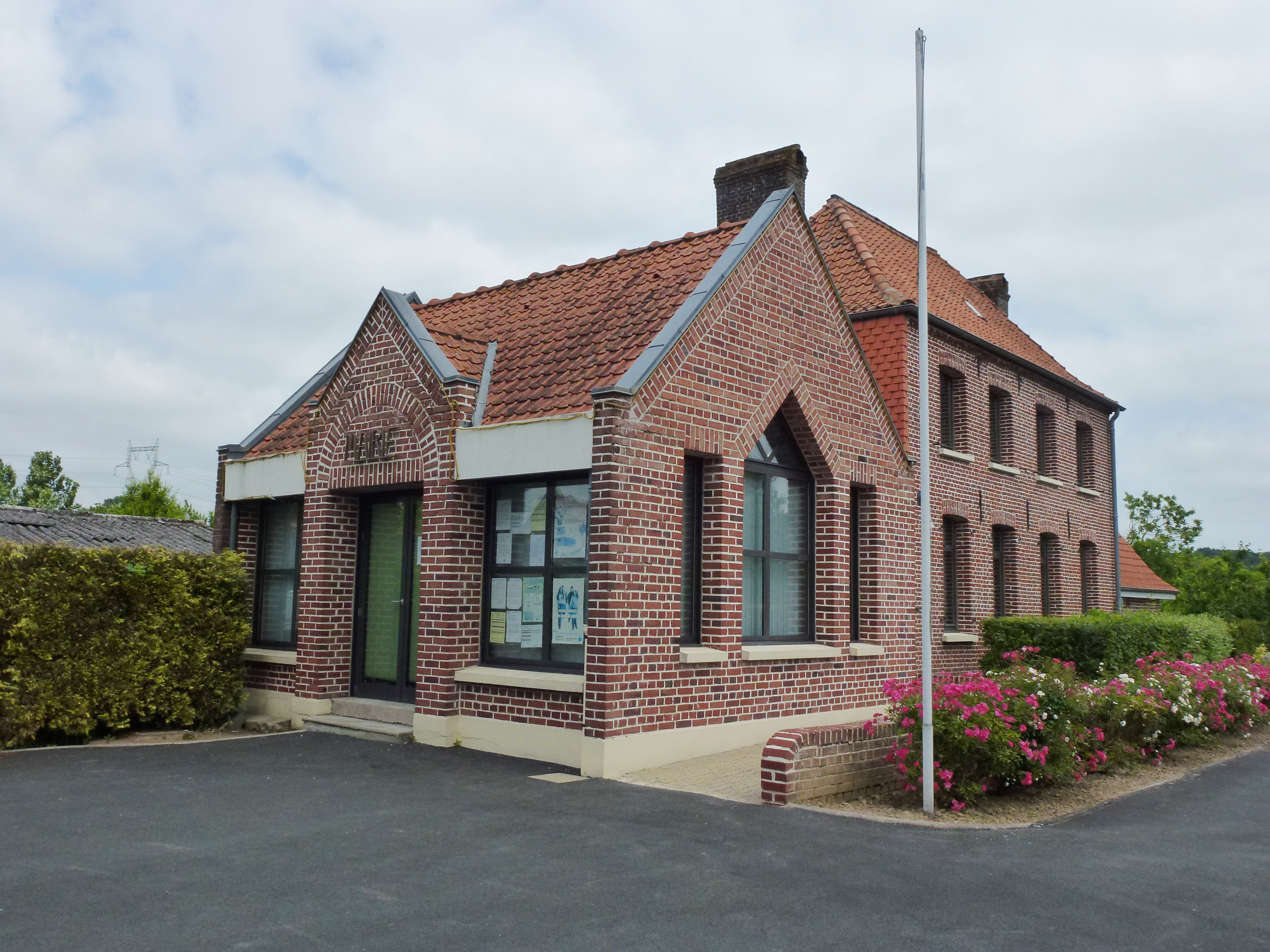
- The town hall of Mazinghem

- Coat of arms
- Location of Mazinghem
- Location within France Location within Hauts-de-France
- Coordinates: 50°36′14″N 2°24′20″E
- Country: France
- Region: Hauts-de-France
- Department: Pas-de-Calais
- Arrondissement: Béthune
- Canton: Aire-sur-la-Lys
- Intercommunality: CA Béthune-Bruay, Artois-Lys Romane

Government
  - Mayor (2020–2026): Claudette Matton
- Area^{1}: 5.19 km^{2} (2.00 sq mi)
- Elevation: 29 m (95 ft)
- Highest elevation: 57 m (187 ft)
- Lowest elevation: 19 m (62 ft)
- Population (2023): 457
  - Density: 88.1/km^{2} (228/sq mi)
- Time zone: UTC+01:00 (CET)
  - Summer (DST): UTC+02:00 (CEST)
- INSEE/Postal code: 62564 /62120
- ^{1} French Land Register data, which excludes lakes, ponds, glaciers > 1 km^{2} (0.386 sq mi or 247 acres) and river estuaries.

Mazinghem (French pronunciation: [mazɛ̃ɡɛm]) is a commune in the Pas-de-Calais department in the Hauts-de-France region of France about 12 miles (19 km) northwest of Béthune and 33 miles (53 km) west of Lille.

== Population ==
Historical population
Year	Pop.	±% p.a.
1968	286	—
1975	298	+0.59%
1982	325	+1.25%
1990	321	−0.15%
1999	337	+0.54%
2007	410	+2.48%
2012	486	+3.46%
2017	474	−0.50%
2023	457	−0.61%
Source: INSEE

== See also ==
- Communes of the Pas-de-Calais department
