= Canton of Barlin =

Coordinates: 50°29′06″N 2°36′23″E

The Canton of Barlin was one of the 14 cantons of the arrondissement of Béthune, in the Pas-de-Calais department, in northern France. It had 18,003 inhabitants in 2012. It was disbanded following the French canton reorganisation which came into effect in March 2015.
