= Isbergues =

Isbergues Iberge
- Commune
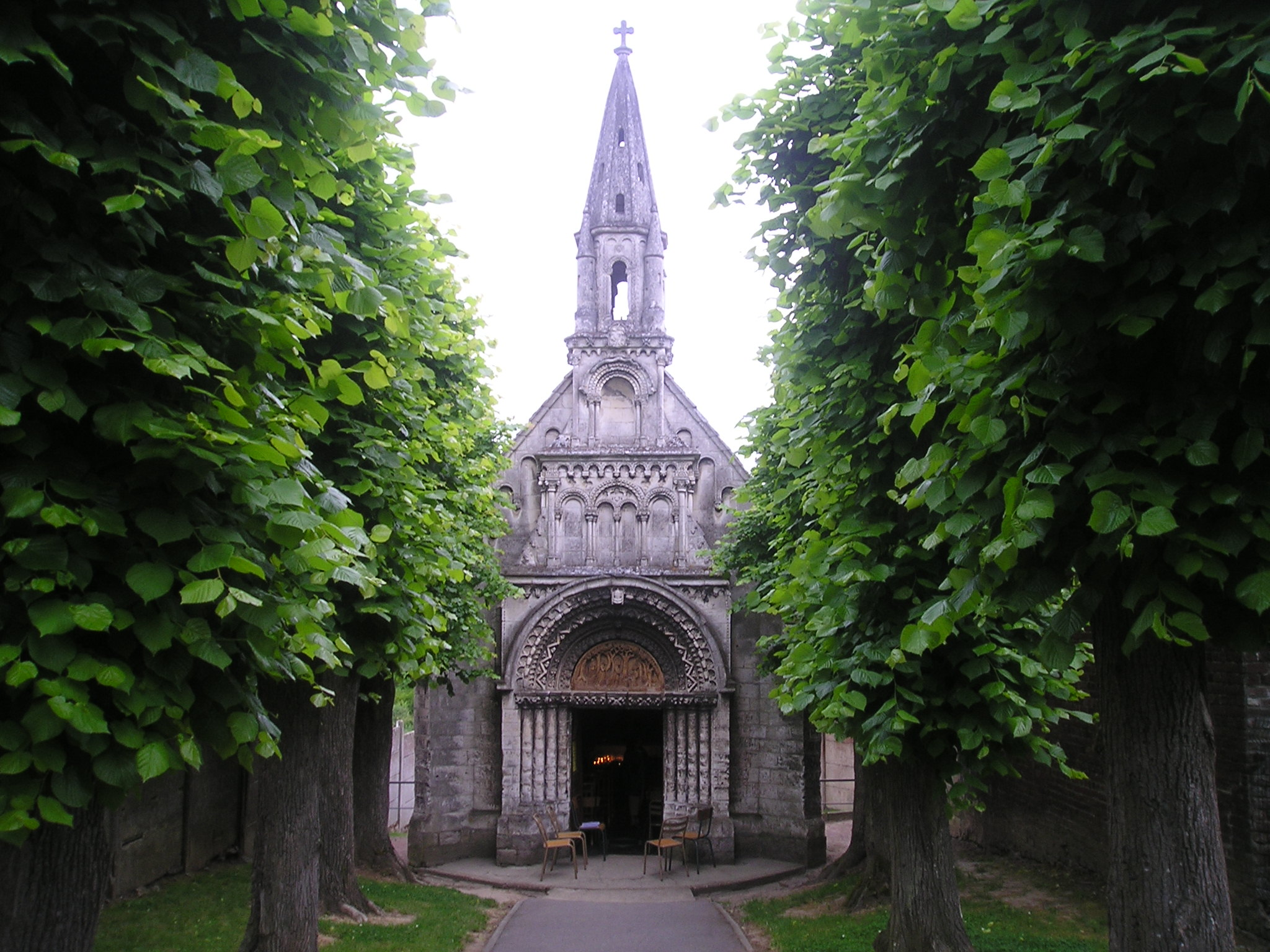
- Chapel of Saint Isbergues

- Coat of arms
- Location of Isbergues
- Location within France Location within Hauts-de-France
- Coordinates: 50°37′27″N 2°27′27″E
- Country: France
- Region: Hauts-de-France
- Department: Pas-de-Calais
- Arrondissement: Béthune
- Canton: Aire-sur-la-Lys
- Intercommunality: CA Béthune-Bruay, Artois-Lys Romane

Government
  - Mayor (2020–2026): David Thellier
- Area^{1}: 14.37 km^{2} (5.55 sq mi)
- Elevation: 19 m (62 ft)
- Highest elevation: 44 m (144 ft)
- Lowest elevation: 16 m (52 ft)
- Population (2023): 8,650
  - Density: 602/km^{2} (1,560/sq mi)
- Time zone: UTC+01:00 (CET)
  - Summer (DST): UTC+02:00 (CEST)
- INSEE/Postal code: 62473 /62330
- ^{1} French Land Register data, which excludes lakes, ponds, glaciers > 1 km^{2} (0.386 sq mi or 247 acres) and river estuaries.

Isbergues (French pronunciation: [isbɛʁɡ]; West Flemish: Iberge; Picard: Iberque) is a commune in the Pas-de-Calais department in the Hauts-de-France region of France about 10 miles (16 km) northwest of Béthune and 29 miles (47 km) west of Lille by the banks of the Canal d’Aire.

On 1 January 1996, the former communes of Molinghem, Berguette and Isbergues were consolidated into a single commune and took the name of Isbergues.

== Population ==
Population data refer to the area corresponding with the commune as of January 2025.

Historical population
Year	Pop.	±% p.a.
1968	11,798	—
1975	11,807	+0.01%
1982	10,962	−1.06%
1990	10,395	−0.66%
1999	9,836	−0.61%
2007	9,449	−0.50%
2012	9,119	−0.71%
2017	8,845	−0.61%
2023	8,650	−0.37%
Source: INSEE

== See also ==
- Communes of the Pas-de-Calais department
