= Linghem =

- Commune
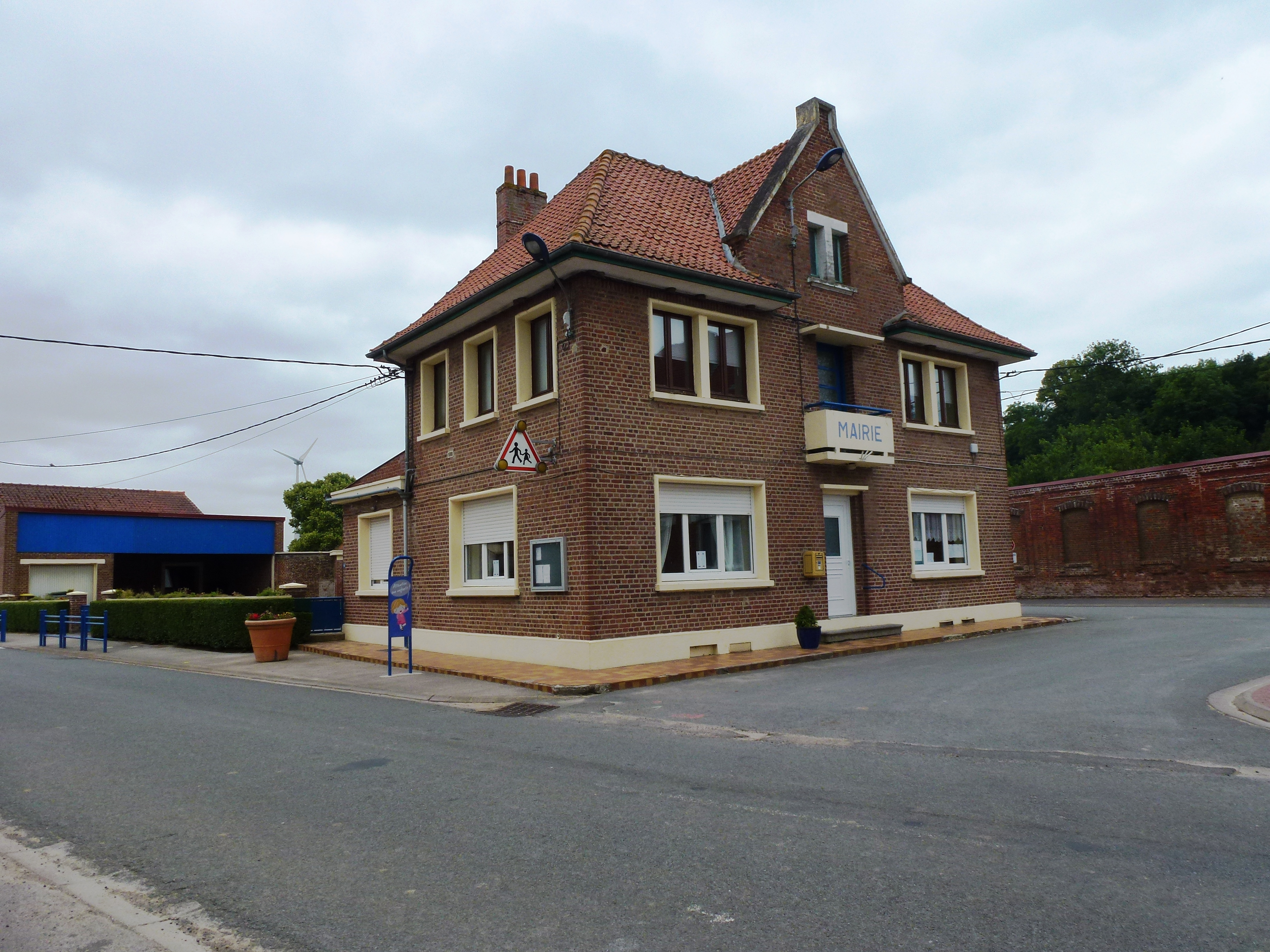
- The town hall of Linghem

- Coat of arms
- Location of Linghem
- Location within France Location within Hauts-de-France
- Coordinates: 50°35′41″N 2°22′18″E
- Country: France
- Region: Hauts-de-France
- Department: Pas-de-Calais
- Arrondissement: Béthune
- Canton: Aire-sur-la-Lys
- Intercommunality: CA Béthune-Bruay, Artois-Lys Romane

Government
  - Mayor (2020–2026): Marcel Blondel
- Area^{1}: 3.63 km^{2} (1.40 sq mi)
- Elevation: 48 m (157 ft)
- Highest elevation: 80 m (260 ft)
- Lowest elevation: 36 m (118 ft)
- Population (2023): 219
  - Density: 60.3/km^{2} (156/sq mi)
- Time zone: UTC+01:00 (CET)
  - Summer (DST): UTC+02:00 (CEST)
- INSEE/Postal code: 62517 /62120
- ^{1} French Land Register data, which excludes lakes, ponds, glaciers > 1 km^{2} (0.386 sq mi or 247 acres) and river estuaries.

Linghem is a commune in the Pas-de-Calais department in the Hauts-de-France region of France about 12 miles (19 km) northwest of Béthune and 34 miles (55 km) west of Lille.

== Population ==
Historical population
Year	Pop.	±% p.a.
1968	263	—
1975	257	−0.33%
1982	224	−1.94%
1990	229	+0.28%
1999	230	+0.05%
2007	214	−0.90%
2012	214	+0.00%
2017	205	−0.86%
2023	219	+1.11%
Source: INSEE

== See also ==
- Communes of the Pas-de-Calais department
