= Fresnicourt-le-Dolmen =

- Commune
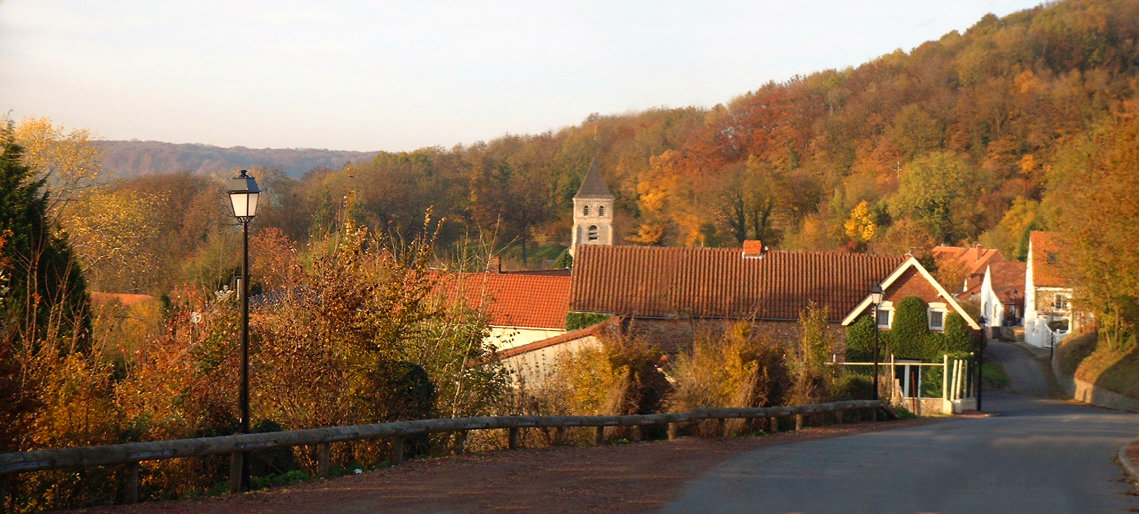
- A general view of Fresnicourt-le-Dolmen

- Coat of arms
- Location of Fresnicourt-le-Dolmen
- Location within France Location within Hauts-de-France
- Coordinates: 50°25′08″N 2°36′02″E
- Country: France
- Region: Hauts-de-France
- Department: Pas-de-Calais
- Arrondissement: Béthune
- Canton: Bruay-la-Buissière
- Intercommunality: CA Béthune-Bruay, Artois-Lys Romane

Government
  - Mayor (2020–2026): Dany Clairet
- Area^{1}: 7.95 km^{2} (3.07 sq mi)
- Elevation: 188 m (617 ft)
- Highest elevation: 186 m (610 ft)
- Lowest elevation: 77 m (253 ft)
- Population (2023): 791
  - Density: 99.5/km^{2} (258/sq mi)
- Time zone: UTC+01:00 (CET)
  - Summer (DST): UTC+02:00 (CEST)
- INSEE/Postal code: 62356 /62150
- ^{1} French Land Register data, which excludes lakes, ponds, glaciers > 1 km^{2} (0.386 sq mi or 247 acres) and river estuaries.

Fresnicourt-le-Dolmen (French pronunciation: [fʁɛnikuʁ lə dɔlmɛn]) is a commune in the Pas-de-Calais department in the Hauts-de-France region of France about 10 miles (16 km) south of Béthune and 20 miles (32 km) southwest of Lille.

== Population ==
Historical population
Year	Pop.	±% p.a.
1968	1,078	—
1975	1,014	−0.87%
1982	974	−0.57%
1990	907	−0.89%
1999	880	−0.34%
2007	847	−0.48%
2012	812	−0.84%
2017	772	−1.01%
2023	791	+0.41%
Source: INSEE

== Places of interest ==
- The fifteenth century Château d'Olhain
- The Arboretum d'Olhain
- The neolithic dolmen "La Table des Fées"
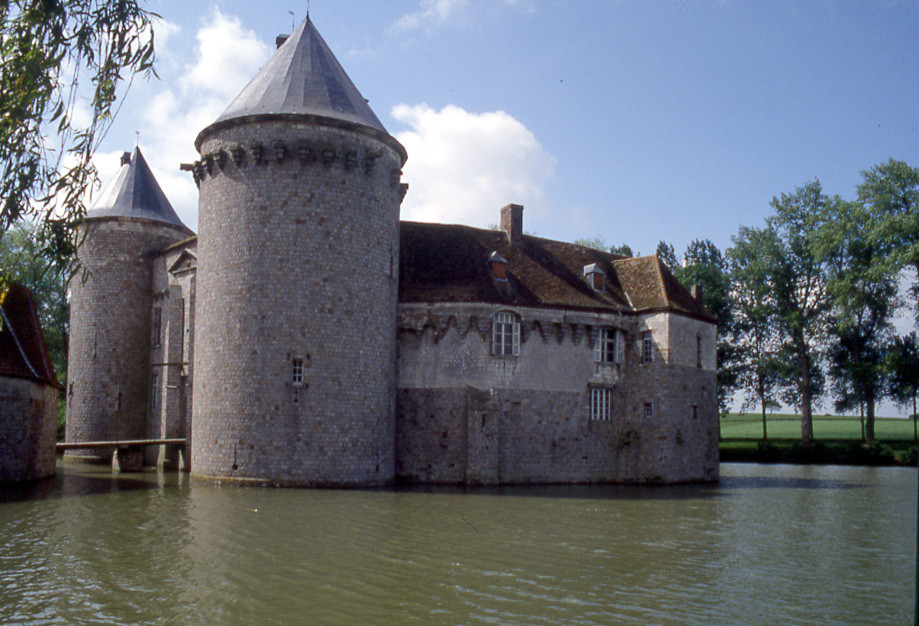
The Château d'Olhain

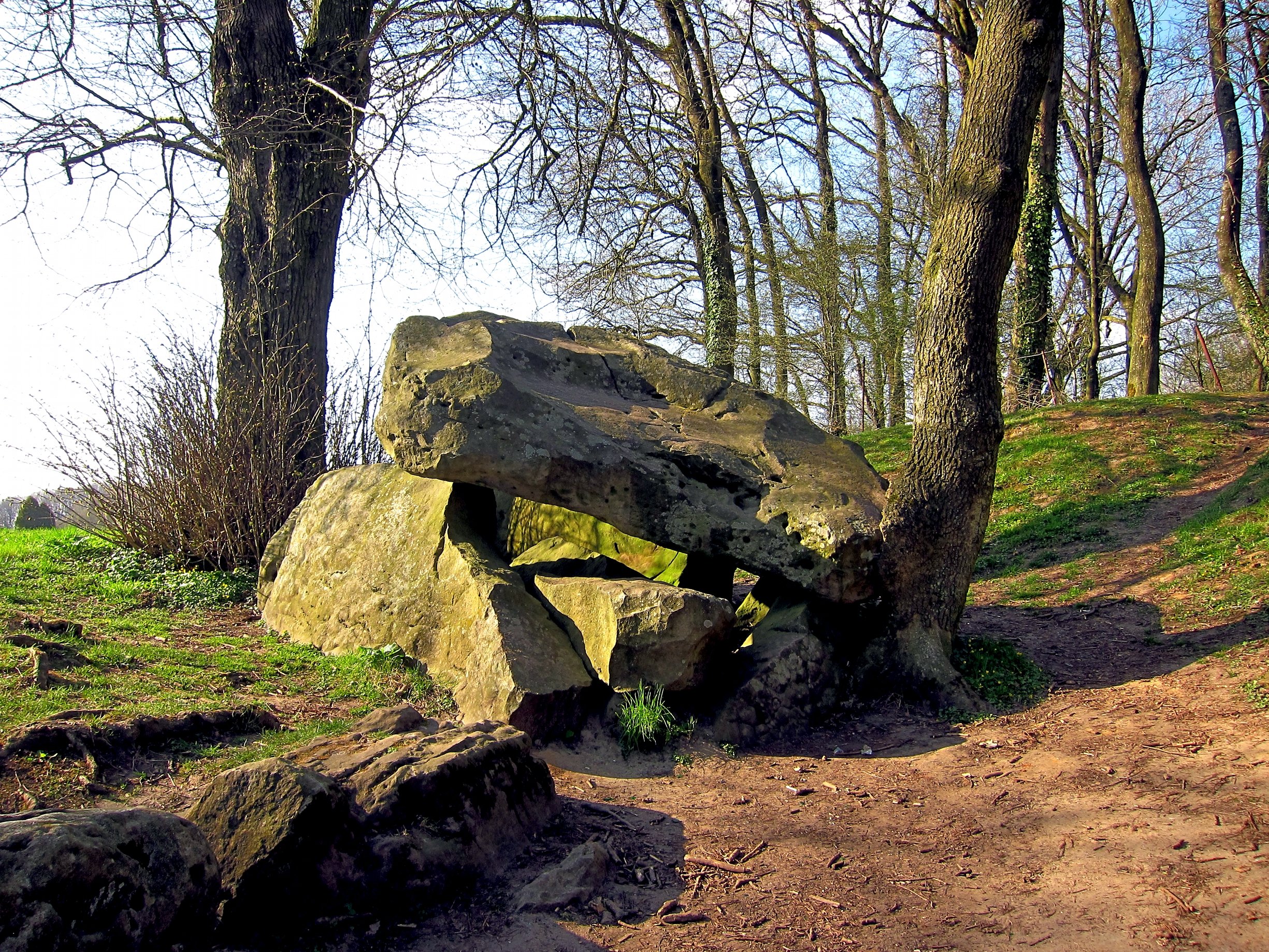
The dolmen "La Table des Fées"

== See also ==
- Communes of the Pas-de-Calais department
