= Rely, Pas-de-Calais =

Rely
- Commune
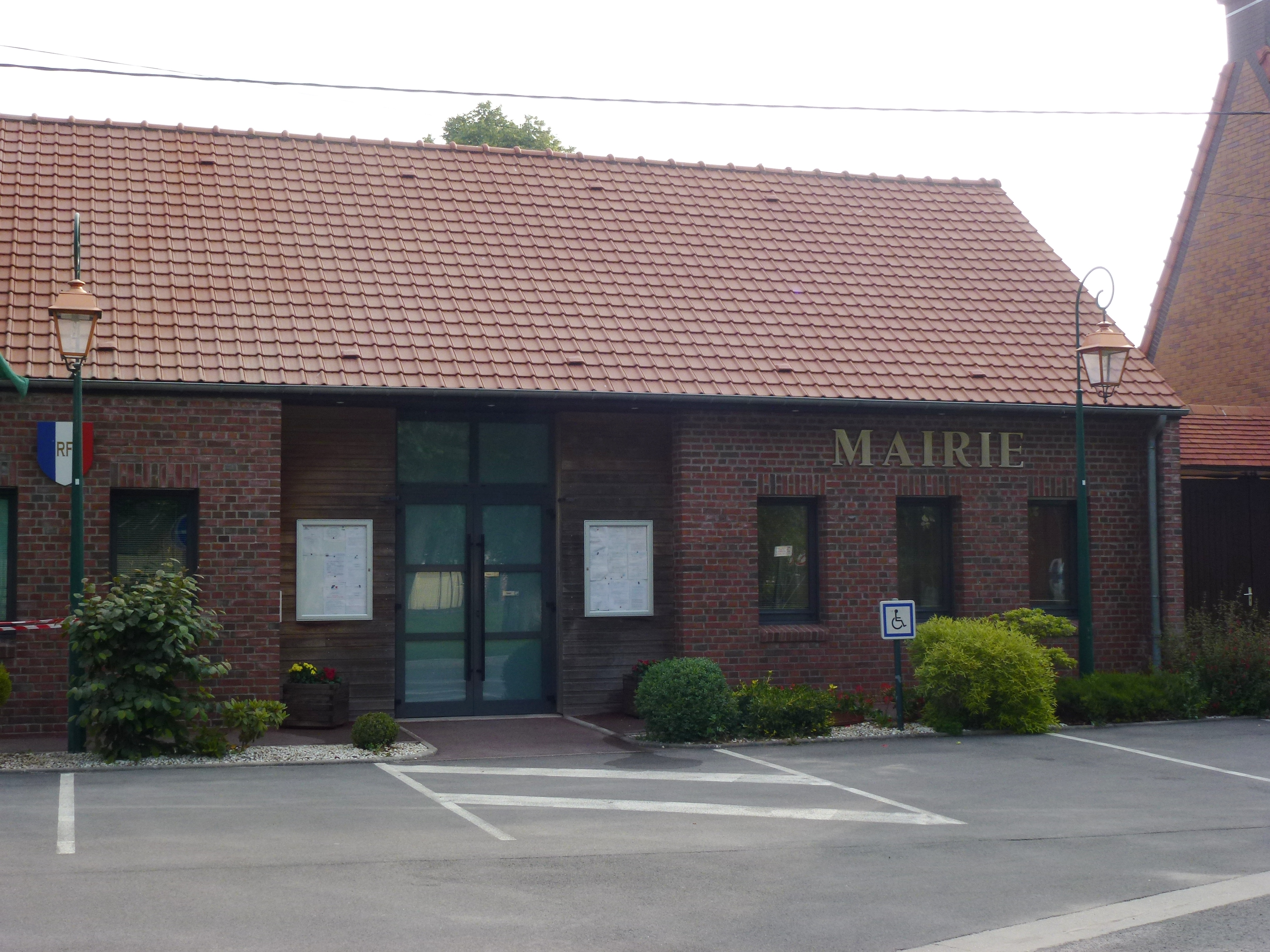
- The town hall of Rely

- Coat of arms
- Location of Rely
- Location within France Location within Hauts-de-France
- Coordinates: 50°34′22″N 2°21′48″E
- Country: France
- Region: Hauts-de-France
- Department: Pas-de-Calais
- Arrondissement: Béthune
- Canton: Aire-sur-la-Lys
- Intercommunality: CA Béthune-Bruay, Artois-Lys Romane

Government
  - Mayor (2020–2026): Jean-Marie Macke
- Area^{1}: 4.83 km^{2} (1.86 sq mi)
- Elevation: 98 m (322 ft)
- Highest elevation: 103 m (338 ft)
- Lowest elevation: 55 m (180 ft)
- Population (2023): 464
  - Density: 96.1/km^{2} (249/sq mi)
- Time zone: UTC+01:00 (CET)
  - Summer (DST): UTC+02:00 (CEST)
- INSEE/Postal code: 62701 /62120
- ^{1} French Land Register data, which excludes lakes, ponds, glaciers > 1 km^{2} (0.386 sq mi or 247 acres) and river estuaries.

Rely (Picard: Arly) is a commune in the Pas-de-Calais department in the Hauts-de-France region of France.

== Geography ==
Rely is situated some 12 miles (19 km) west of Béthune and 34 miles (55 km) southwest of Lille, at the junction of the D341 (an old Roman road, the Chaussée Brunehaut) and the D90 road. The A26 autoroute passes by the commune.

== Population ==
Historical population
Year	Pop.	±% p.a.
1968	378	—
1975	360	−0.69%
1982	351	−0.36%
1990	348	−0.11%
1999	371	+0.71%
2007	421	+1.59%
2012	472	+2.31%
2017	454	−0.77%
2023	464	+0.36%
Source: INSEE

== Places of interest ==
- The church of St.Martin, dating from the sixteenth century.
- The motte and moat of a feudal castle.

== See also ==
- Communes of the Pas-de-Calais department
