= Liettres =

Liettres Liste
- Commune
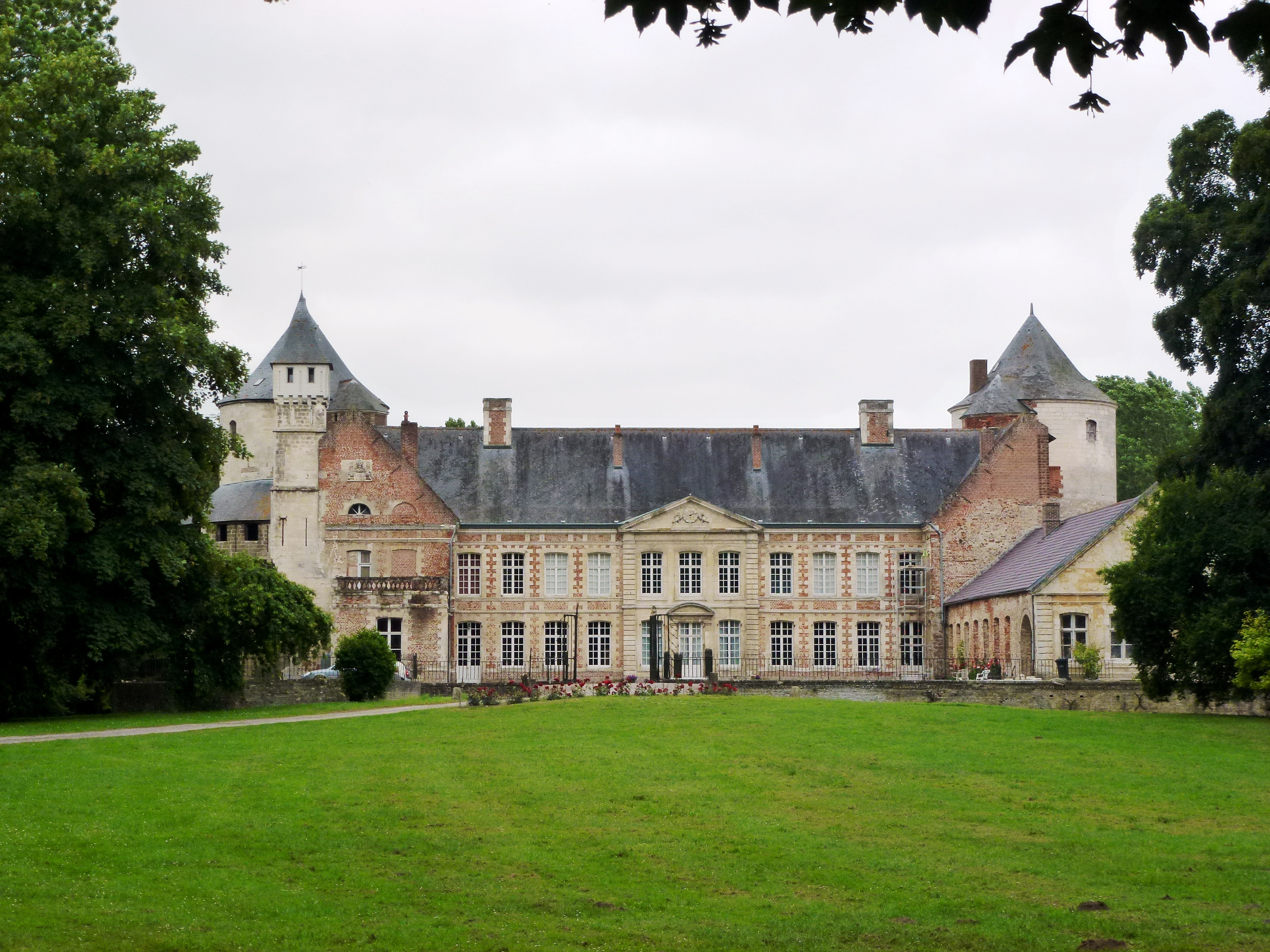
- Château de Liettres

- Coat of arms
- Location of Liettres
- Location within France Location within Hauts-de-France
- Coordinates: 50°35′47″N 2°20′35″E
- Country: France
- Region: Hauts-de-France
- Department: Pas-de-Calais
- Arrondissement: Béthune
- Canton: Aire-sur-la-Lys
- Intercommunality: CA Béthune-Bruay, Artois-Lys Romane

Government
  - Mayor (2021–2026): Pierre Becuwe
- Area^{1}: 3.07 km^{2} (1.19 sq mi)
- Elevation: 50 m (160 ft)
- Highest elevation: 91 m (299 ft)
- Lowest elevation: 32 m (105 ft)
- Population (2023): 378
  - Density: 123/km^{2} (319/sq mi)
- Time zone: UTC+01:00 (CET)
  - Summer (DST): UTC+02:00 (CEST)
- INSEE/Postal code: 62509 /62145
- ^{1} French Land Register data, which excludes lakes, ponds, glaciers > 1 km^{2} (0.386 sq mi or 247 acres) and river estuaries.

Liettres (French pronunciation: [ljɛtʁ]; West Flemish: Liste) is a commune in the Pas-de-Calais department in the Hauts-de-France region of France about 12 miles (19 km) northwest of Béthune and 32 miles (51 km) west of Lille.

== Population ==
Historical population
Year	Pop.	±% p.a.
1968	226	—
1975	229	+0.19%
1982	241	+0.73%
1990	224	−0.91%
1999	239	+0.72%
2007	291	+2.49%
2012	296	+0.34%
2017	327	+2.01%
2023	378	+2.44%
Source: INSEE

== See also ==
- Communes of the Pas-de-Calais department
