= Estrée-Blanche =

Estrée-Blanche Strate
- Commune
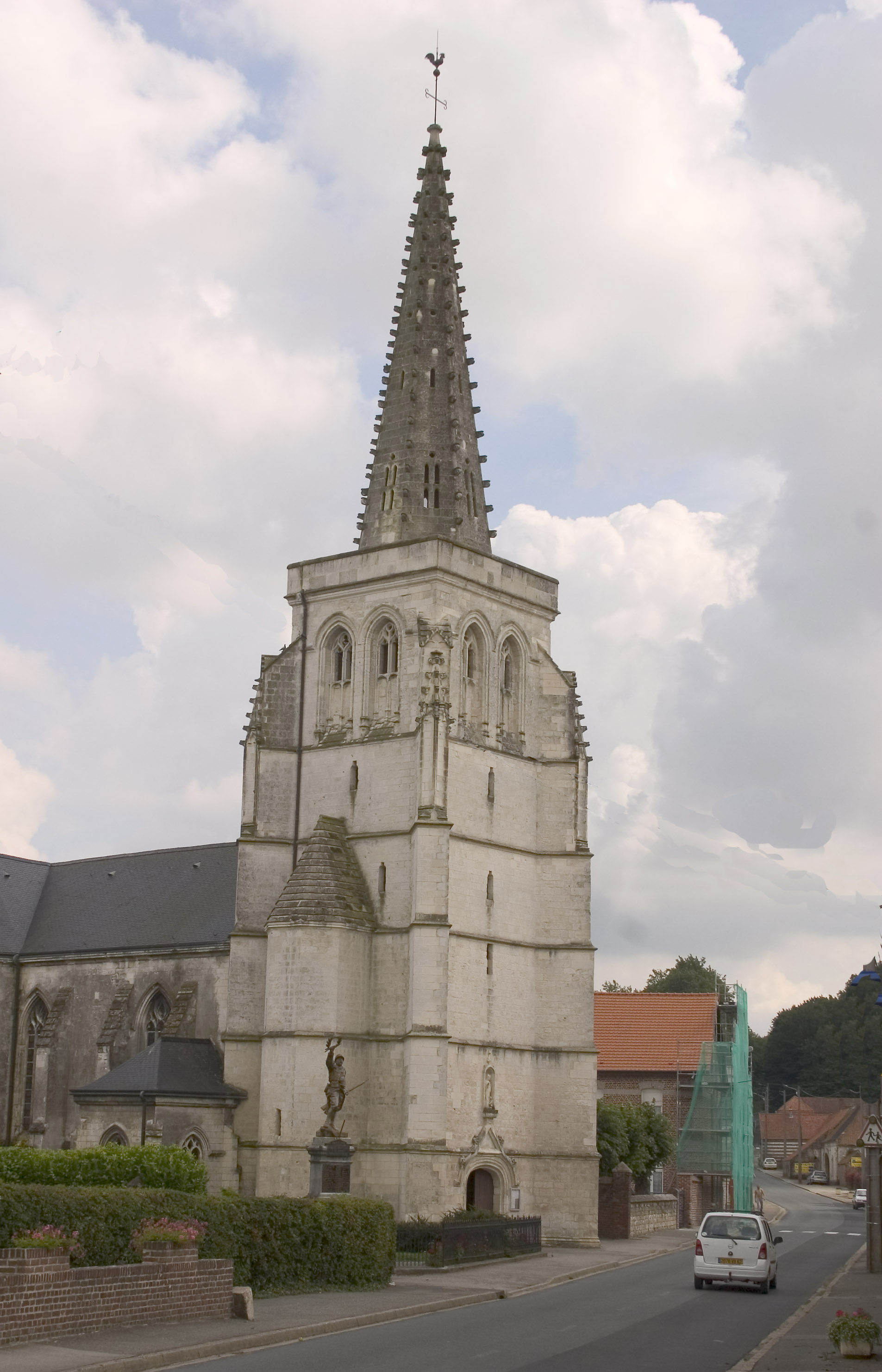
- The church of Estrée-Blanche
- Location of Estrée-Blanche
- Location within France Location within Hauts-de-France
- Coordinates: 50°35′38″N 2°19′19″E
- Country: France
- Region: Hauts-de-France
- Department: Pas-de-Calais
- Arrondissement: Béthune
- Canton: Aire-sur-la-Lys
- Intercommunality: CA Béthune-Bruay, Artois-Lys Romane

Government
  - Mayor (2020–2026): Bernard Delétré
- Area^{1}: 5.32 km^{2} (2.05 sq mi)
- Elevation: 43 m (141 ft)
- Highest elevation: 99 m (325 ft)
- Lowest elevation: 37 m (121 ft)
- Population (2023): 913
  - Density: 172/km^{2} (444/sq mi)
- Time zone: UTC+01:00 (CET)
  - Summer (DST): UTC+02:00 (CEST)
- INSEE/Postal code: 62313 /62145
- ^{1} French Land Register data, which excludes lakes, ponds, glaciers > 1 km^{2} (0.386 sq mi or 247 acres) and river estuaries.

Estrée-Blanche (French pronunciation: [etʁe blɑ̃ʃ]; West Flemish: Strate) is a commune in the Pas-de-Calais department in the Hauts-de-France region of France 12 miles (19 km) northwest of Béthune and 30 miles (48 km) west of Lille. The small rivers Surgeon and Laquette converge at the commune.

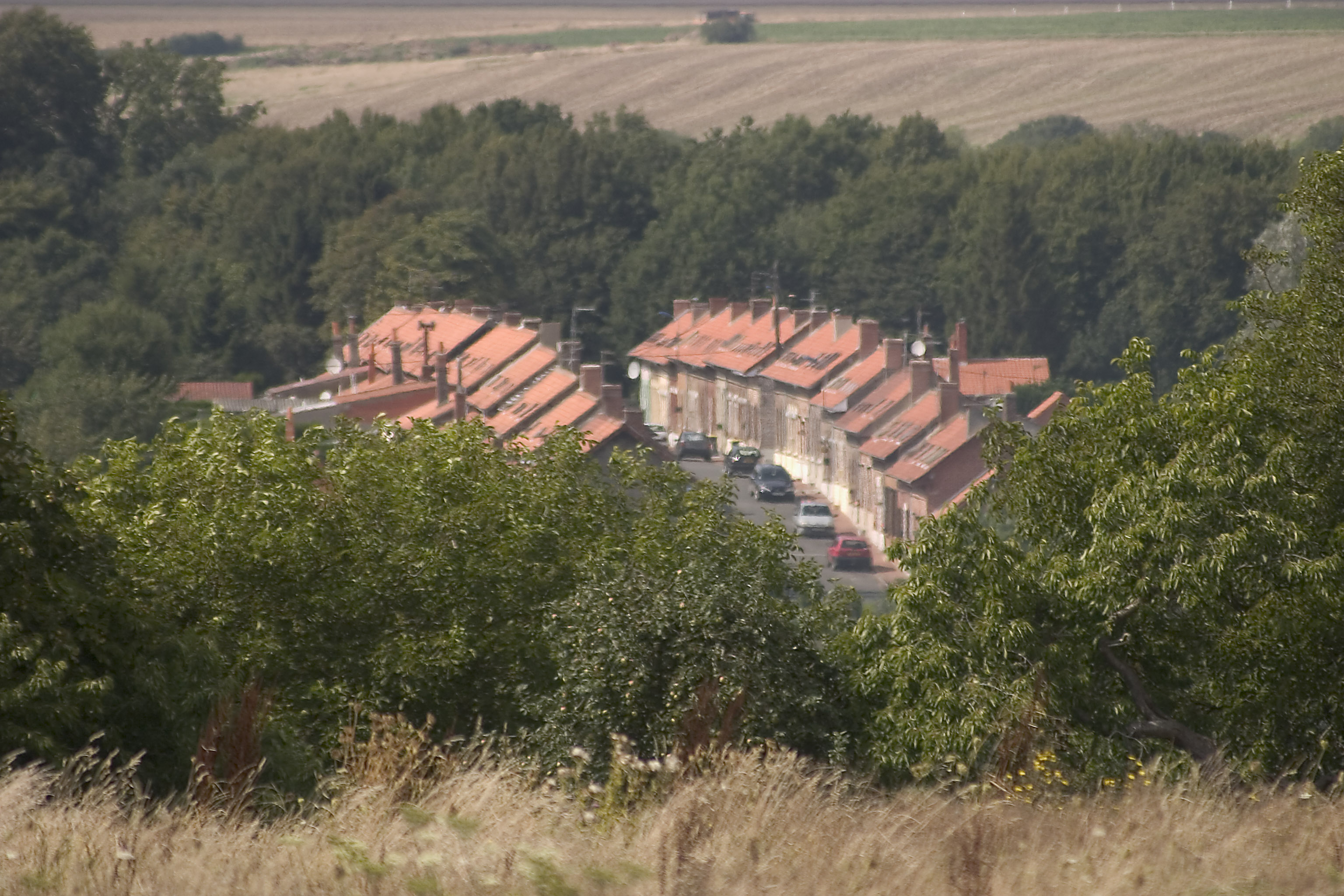
Miners' houses in the village

== Population ==
Historical population
Year	Pop.	±% p.a.
1968	1,093	—
1975	1,068	−0.33%
1982	1,005	−0.86%
1990	988	−0.21%
1999	928	−0.69%
2007	919	−0.12%
2012	948	+0.62%
2017	951	+0.06%
2023	913	−0.68%
Source: INSEE

== See also ==
- Communes of the Pas-de-Calais department
