= Witternesse =

Witternesse Witernes
- Commune
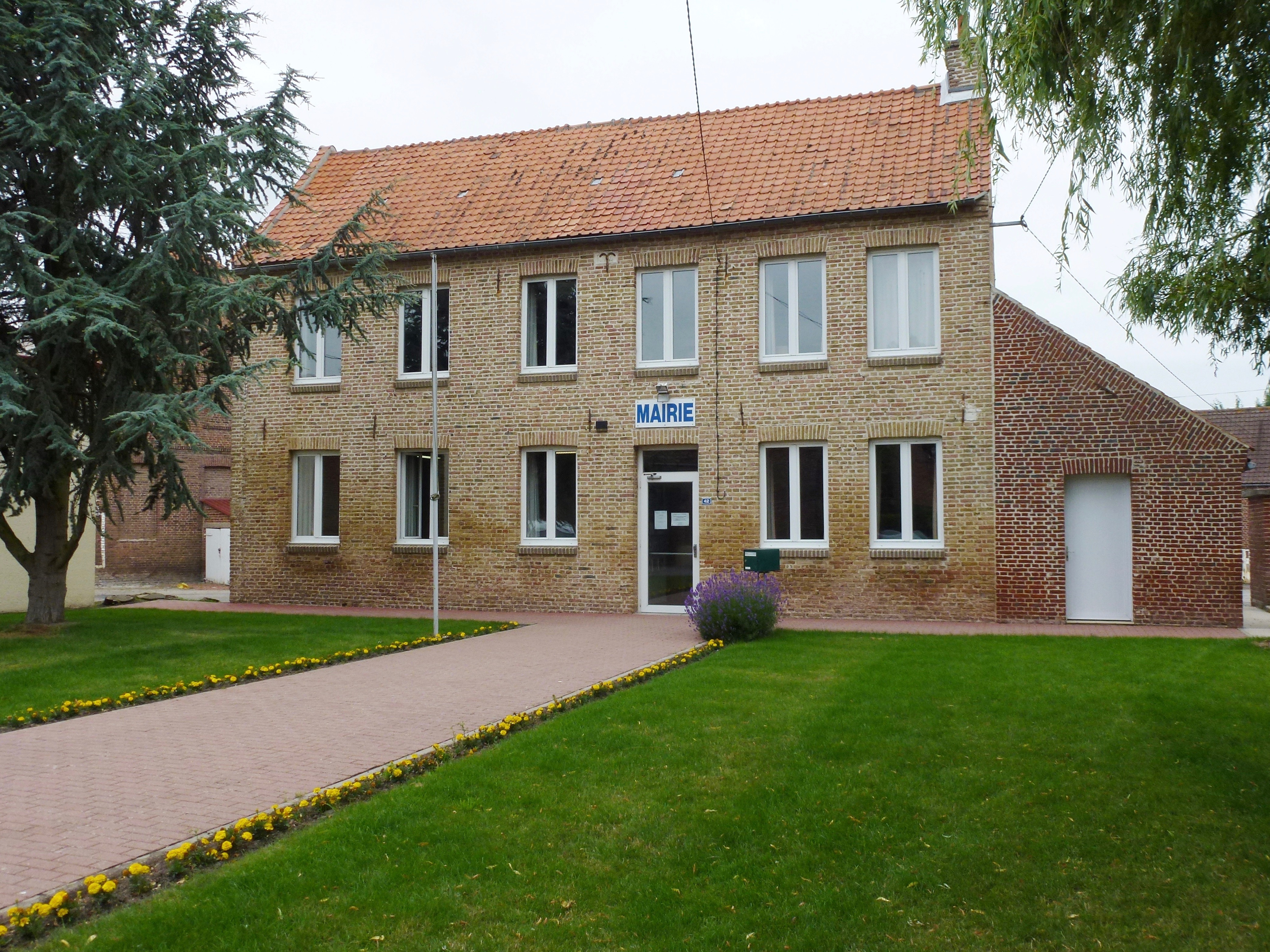
- The town hall of Witternesse

- Coat of arms
- Location of Witternesse
- Location within France Location within Hauts-de-France
- Coordinates: 50°36′45″N 2°21′40″E
- Country: France
- Region: Hauts-de-France
- Department: Pas-de-Calais
- Arrondissement: Béthune
- Canton: Aire-sur-la-Lys
- Intercommunality: Béthune-Bruay, Artois-Lys Romane

Government
  - Mayor (2020–2026): Alain Ducrocq
- Area^{1}: 5.47 km^{2} (2.11 sq mi)
- Elevation: 15 m (49 ft)
- Highest elevation: 62 m (203 ft)
- Lowest elevation: 18 m (59 ft)
- Population (2023): 636
  - Density: 116/km^{2} (301/sq mi)
- Time zone: UTC+01:00 (CET)
  - Summer (DST): UTC+02:00 (CEST)
- INSEE/Postal code: 62900 /62120
- ^{1} French Land Register data, which excludes lakes, ponds, glaciers > 1 km^{2} (0.386 sq mi or 247 acres) and river estuaries.

Witternesse (West Flemish: Witernes) is a commune in the Pas-de-Calais department in the Hauts-de-France region of France.

== Geography ==
Witternesse is situated some 15 miles (24 km) west of Béthune and 36 miles (58 km) southwest of Lille, at the junction of the D186e and D186 roads. The A26 autoroute passes by the commune.

== Population ==
Historical population
Year	Pop.	±% p.a.
1968	587	—
1975	573	−0.34%
1982	523	−1.30%
1990	552	+0.68%
1999	534	−0.37%
2007	567	+0.75%
2012	581	+0.49%
2017	587	+0.21%
2023	636	+1.35%
Source: INSEE

== Places of interest ==
- The church of St.Martin, dating from the seventeenth century.
- The watermill.
- The seventeenth century priory, now a peoples home.
- The manor and museum of La Besvre.

== See also ==
- Communes of the Pas-de-Calais department
