= Blessy, Pas-de-Calais =

Blessy
- Commune
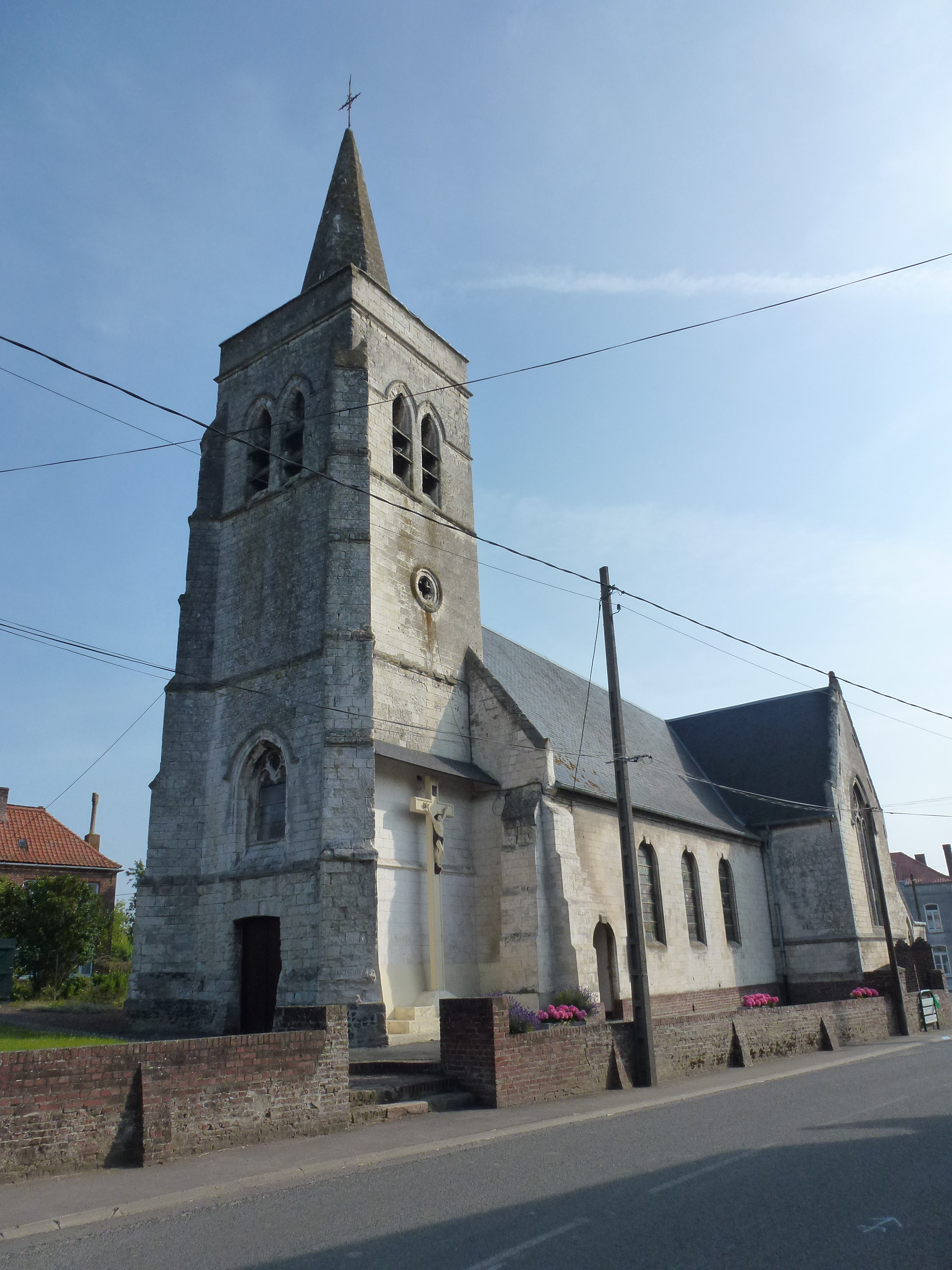
- The church of Blessy

- Coat of arms
- Location of Blessy
- Location within France Location within Hauts-de-France
- Coordinates: 50°36′56″N 2°19′59″E
- Country: France
- Region: Hauts-de-France
- Department: Pas-de-Calais
- Arrondissement: Béthune
- Canton: Aire-sur-la-Lys
- Intercommunality: CA Béthune-Bruay, Artois-Lys Romane

Government
  - Mayor (2020–2026): Jean Marc Furgerot
- Area^{1}: 5.39 km^{2} (2.08 sq mi)
- Elevation: 29 m (95 ft)
- Highest elevation: 98 m (322 ft)
- Lowest elevation: 21 m (69 ft)
- Population (2023): 907
  - Density: 168/km^{2} (436/sq mi)
- Time zone: UTC+01:00 (CET)
  - Summer (DST): UTC+02:00 (CEST)
- INSEE/Postal code: 62141 /62120
- ^{1} French Land Register data, which excludes lakes, ponds, glaciers > 1 km^{2} (0.386 sq mi or 247 acres) and river estuaries.

Blessy (French pronunciation: [blɛsi]) is a commune in the Pas-de-Calais department in the northern Hauts-de-France region of France about 14 miles (23 km) northwest of Béthune and 32 miles (51 km) west of Lille.

== Population ==
Historical population
Year	Pop.	±% p.a.
1968	600	—
1975	583	−0.41%
1982	586	+0.07%
1990	661	+1.52%
1999	631	−0.51%
2007	801	+3.03%
2012	859	+1.41%
2017	870	+0.25%
2023	907	+0.70%
Source: INSEE

== See also ==
- Communes of the Pas-de-Calais department
