= Château d'Olhain =

15th-century castle located in France

Coordinates: 50°25′27″N 2°35′0″E

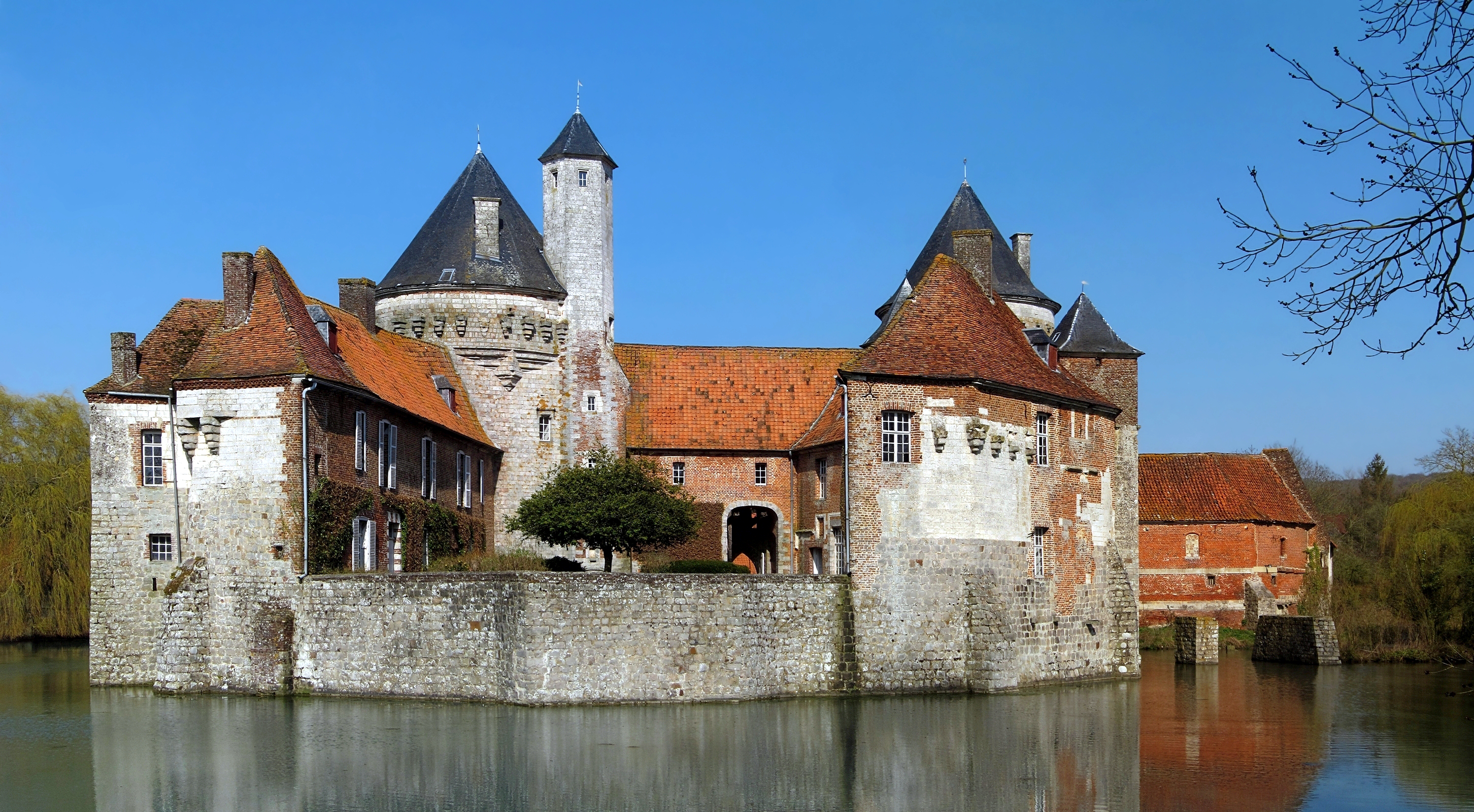
The Château d'Olhain

The Château d'Olhain is a 15th-century castle located in Olhain, Fresnicourt-le-Dolmen, Pas-de-Calais, Nord-Pas-de-Calais, France. It is a listed monument since 1989.

The castle is located in the middle of a lake which reflects its towers and curtain walls. It was also a major stronghold for the Artois in medieval times and testimony to the power of the Olhain family, first mentioned from the 12th century.

The castle existed in at least the early 13th century, but the present structure is largely the work of Jean de Nielles, who married Marie d’Olhain at the end of the 15th century.

The marriage of Alix Nielles to Jean de Berghes, Grand Veneur de France (master of hounds) to the King, meant the castle passed to this family, who kept it for more than 450 years. Once confiscated by Charles V, Holy Roman Emperor, it suffered during the wars that ravaged the Artois. Besieged in 1641 by the French, it was partly demolished by the Spaniards in 1654, and finally blown-up and taken by the Dutch in 1710. Restored in 1830, it was abandoned after 1870, and sold by the last Prince of Berghes in 1900. There is also evidence that one of the castles occupants was related to Charles de Batz-Castelmore d'Artagnan, the person on which Alexandre Dumas based his Three Musketeers character d'Artagnan.

During World War I and World War II, the castle was requisitioned first by French troops, then Canadian and British soldiers. The current owner has undertaken a programme of restoration.

== See also ==
- List of castles in France
