= Agglomeration community of Artois =

Coordinates: 50°30′N 2°35′E

Artois
- Former communauté d'agglomération
- Interactive map of Artois
- Country: France
- Region: Hauts-de-France
- Department: Pas-de-Calais
- No. of communes: {{{nbcomm}}}
- Established: 2002
- Disbanded: 2014
- Area: 389 km^{2} (150 sq mi)
- Population (2013): 209,528
  - Density: 539/km^{2} (1,400/sq mi)

The Communauté d'agglomération de l'Artois (Artois Comm.) is a former administrative entity in the Pas-de-Calais département, in northern France. Administrative center: Béthune.

It covered 59 communes, and had a population of approximately 210,000. It was the largest such communauté in Pas-de-Calais (but the most populated was the Communaupole of Lens-Liévin).

It is named after Artois, a former province of France. It was established in January 2002. It merged with the Communauté de communes de Nœux et environs in 2014, and was renamed Communauté d'agglomération de Béthune Bruay Nœux et environs. This was merged into the new Communauté d'agglomération de Béthune-Bruay, Artois-Lys Romane in 2017.

== Communes ==
The 59 communes as of 2013:

- Annequin
- Annezin
- Auchel
- Auchy-les-Mines
- Bajus
- Barlin
- Béthune
- Beugin
- Beuvry
- Billy-Berclau
- Bruay-la-Buissière
- Calonne-Ricouart
- Camblain-Châtelain
- Cambrin
- Cauchy-à-la-Tour
- Caucourt
- Chocques
- La Comté
- La Couture
- Cuinchy
- Diéval
- Divion
- Douvrin
- Essars
- Estrée-Cauchy
- Festubert
- Fresnicourt-le-Dolmen
- Gauchin-Légal
- Givenchy-lès-la-Bassée
- Gosnay
- Haillicourt
- Haisnes
- Hermin
- Hersin-Coupigny
- Hesdigneul-lès-Béthune
- Hinges
- Houchin
- Houdain
- Labeuvrière
- Lapugnoy
- Locon
- Lorgies
- Lozinghem
- Maisnil-lès-Ruitz
- Marles-les-Mines
- Neuve-Chapelle
- Noyelles-lès-Vermelles
- Oblinghem
- Ourton
- Rebreuve-Ranchicourt
- Richebourg
- Ruitz
- Sailly-Labourse
- Vendin-lès-Béthune
- Vermelles
- Verquigneul
- Verquin
- Vieille-Chapelle
- Violaines
