= Bajus =

Baius may refer to:

- Michael Baius, Belgian theologian
- Bajus, Pas-de-Calais, France
