= Vis-à-Marles station =

French railway station

Coordinates: 50°30′18″N 2°31′01″E

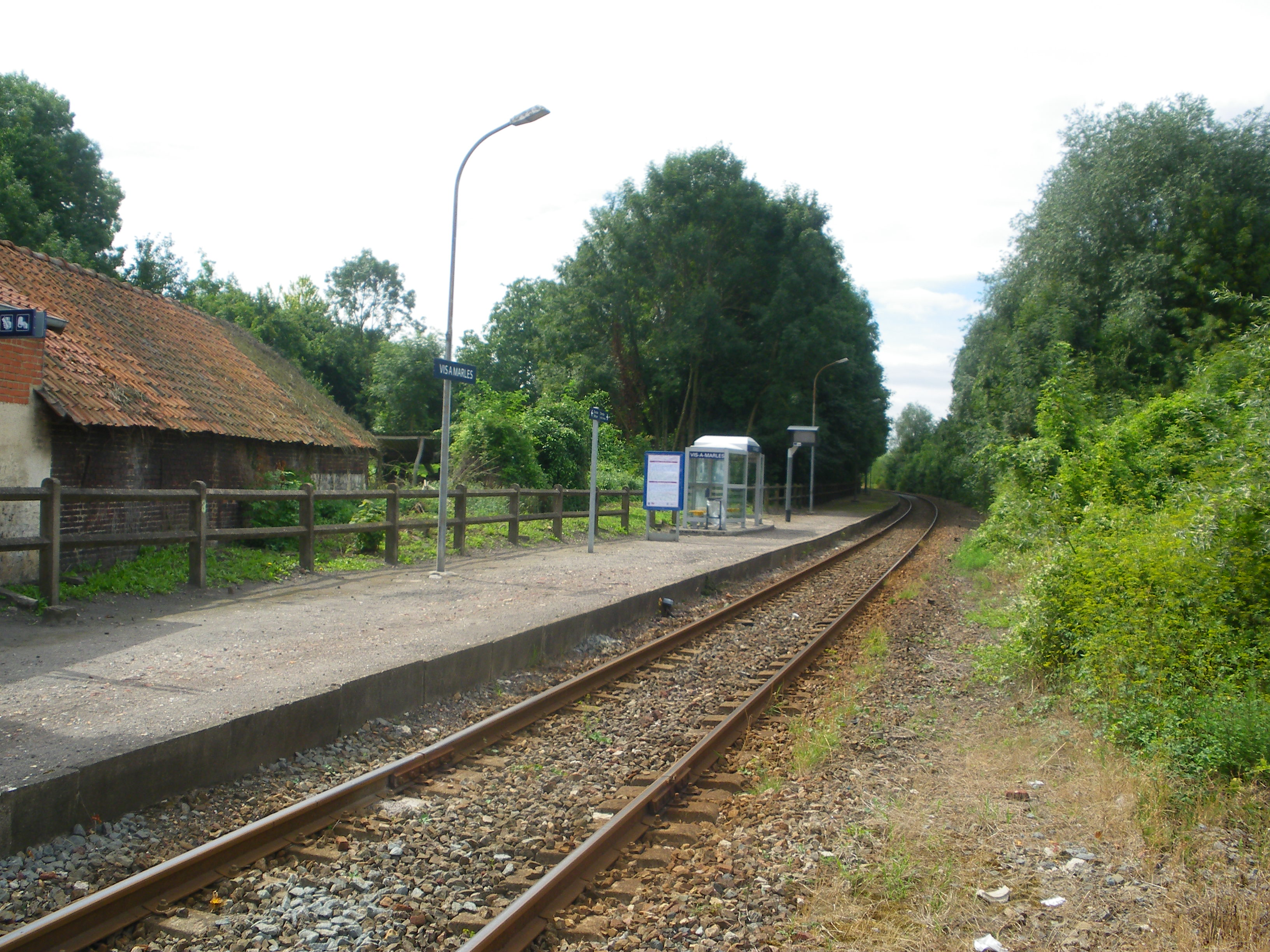
Vis-à-Marles station

Vis-à-Marles is a railway station located in the French commune of Marles-les-Mines (Pas-de-Calais).

The station is served by TER on the line from Saint-Pol-sur-Ternoise to Béthune and Lille-Flandres.

Preceding station	TER Hauts-de-France	Following station
Calonne-Ricouart towards Saint-Pol-sur-Ternoise	Krono K50	Béthune towards Lille-Flandres
Terminus	Proxi P51	Béthune Terminus
