= Caucourt =

- Commune
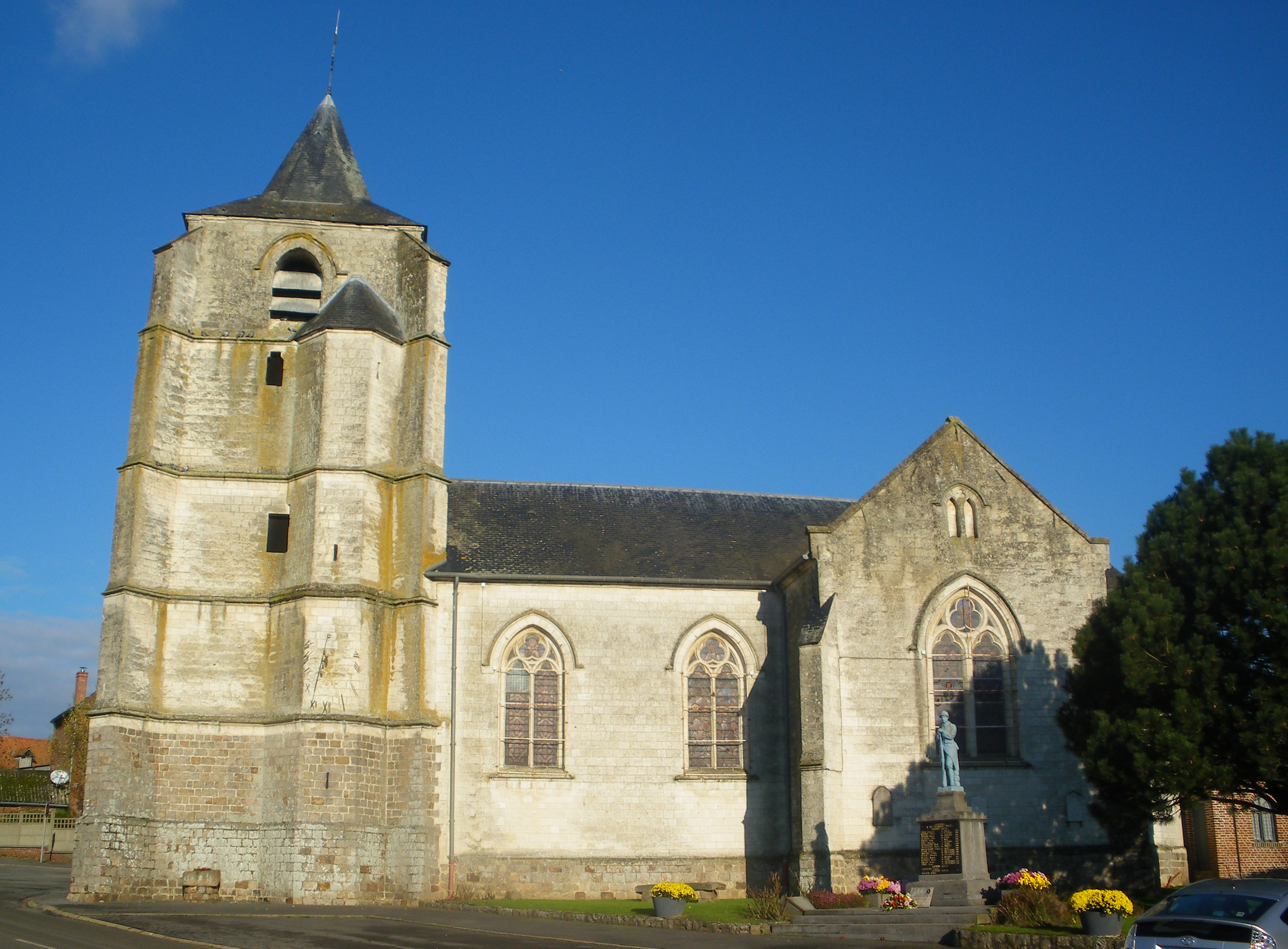
- The church of Caucourt

- Coat of arms
- Location of Caucourt
- Location within France Location within Hauts-de-France
- Coordinates: 50°23′58″N 2°34′20″E
- Country: France
- Region: Hauts-de-France
- Department: Pas-de-Calais
- Arrondissement: Béthune
- Canton: Bruay-la-Buissière
- Intercommunality: CA Béthune-Bruay, Artois-Lys Romane

Government
  - Mayor (2020–2026): Danièle Philippe
- Area^{1}: 5.51 km^{2} (2.13 sq mi)
- Elevation: 112 m (367 ft)
- Highest elevation: 157 m (515 ft)
- Lowest elevation: 94 m (308 ft)
- Population (2023): 331
  - Density: 60.1/km^{2} (156/sq mi)
- Time zone: UTC+01:00 (CET)
  - Summer (DST): UTC+02:00 (CEST)
- INSEE/Postal code: 62218 /62150
- ^{1} French Land Register data, which excludes lakes, ponds, glaciers > 1 km^{2} (0.386 sq mi or 247 acres) and river estuaries.

Caucourt (French pronunciation: [kokuʁ]) is a commune in the Pas-de-Calais department in the Hauts-de-France region of France about 10 miles (16 km) northwest of Arras. The Blanch stream rises there, forming the source of the Lawe river.

== Population ==
Historical population
Year	Pop.	±% p.a.
1968	283	—
1975	268	−0.77%
1982	275	+0.37%
1990	270	−0.23%
1999	277	+0.28%
2007	315	+1.62%
2012	337	+1.36%
2017	346	+0.53%
2023	331	−0.74%
Source: INSEE

== See also ==
- Communes of the Pas-de-Calais department
