= Gauchin-Légal =

- Commune
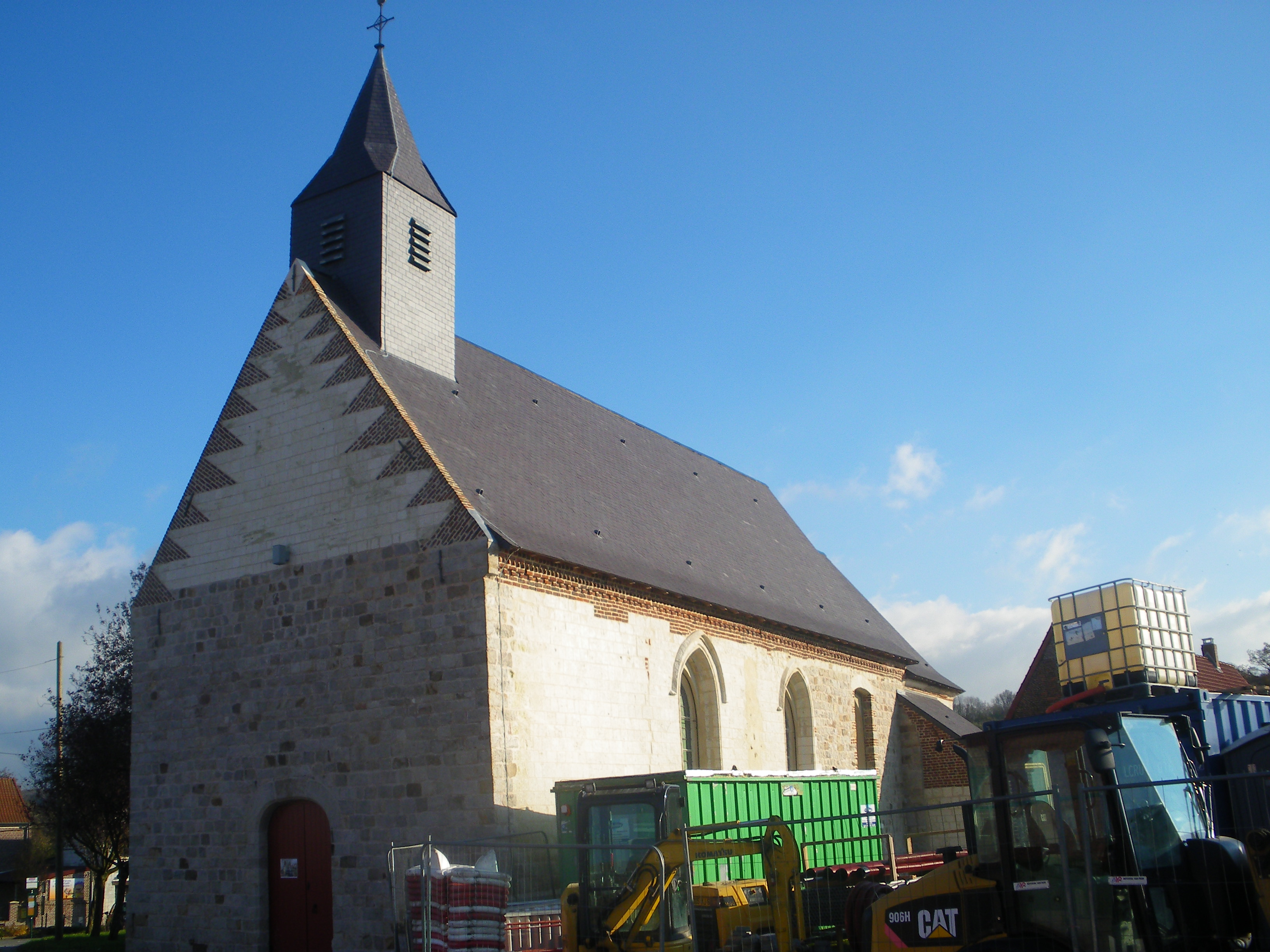
- The church of Gauchin-Légal

- Coat of arms
- Location of Gauchin-Légal
- Location within France Location within Hauts-de-France
- Coordinates: 50°24′56″N 2°34′58″E
- Country: France
- Region: Hauts-de-France
- Department: Pas-de-Calais
- Arrondissement: Béthune
- Canton: Bruay-la-Buissière
- Intercommunality: CA Béthune-Bruay, Artois-Lys Romane

Government
  - Mayor (2020–2026): Dominique Voiseux
- Area^{1}: 6.03 km^{2} (2.33 sq mi)
- Elevation: 93 m (305 ft)
- Highest elevation: 167 m (548 ft)
- Lowest elevation: 85 m (279 ft)
- Population (2023): 296
  - Density: 49.1/km^{2} (127/sq mi)
- Time zone: UTC+01:00 (CET)
  - Summer (DST): UTC+02:00 (CEST)
- INSEE/Postal code: 62366 /62150
- ^{1} French Land Register data, which excludes lakes, ponds, glaciers > 1 km^{2} (0.386 sq mi or 247 acres) and river estuaries.

Gauchin-Légal (French pronunciation: [ɡoʃɛ̃ leɡal]; or Gauchin-le-Gal) is a commune in the Pas-de-Calais department in the Hauts-de-France region of France about 10 miles (16 km) south of Béthune and 29 miles (47 km) southwest of Lille. A small stream, the ‘ruisseau Caucourt’, a tributary of the river Lawe, flows through the village.

== Population ==
Historical population
Year	Pop.	±% p.a.
1968	272	—
1975	245	−1.48%
1982	227	−1.08%
1990	296	+3.37%
1999	331	+1.25%
2007	354	+0.84%
2012	337	−0.98%
2017	321	−0.97%
2023	296	−1.34%
Source: INSEE

== See also ==
- Communes of the Pas-de-Calais department
