= Canton of Auchel =

Coordinates: 50°32′01″N 2°26′33″E

The Canton of Auchel is one of the cantons of the Pas-de-Calais department, in northern France. At the French canton reorganisation which came into effect in March 2015, the canton was reduced from 10 to 9 communes.

It consists of the following communes:

1. Auchel
2. Calonne-Ricouart
3. Camblain-Châtelain
4. Cauchy-à-la-Tour
5. Diéval
6. Divion
7. Lozinghem
8. Marles-les-Mines
9. Ourton
