= Locon =

Locon Lockon
- Commune
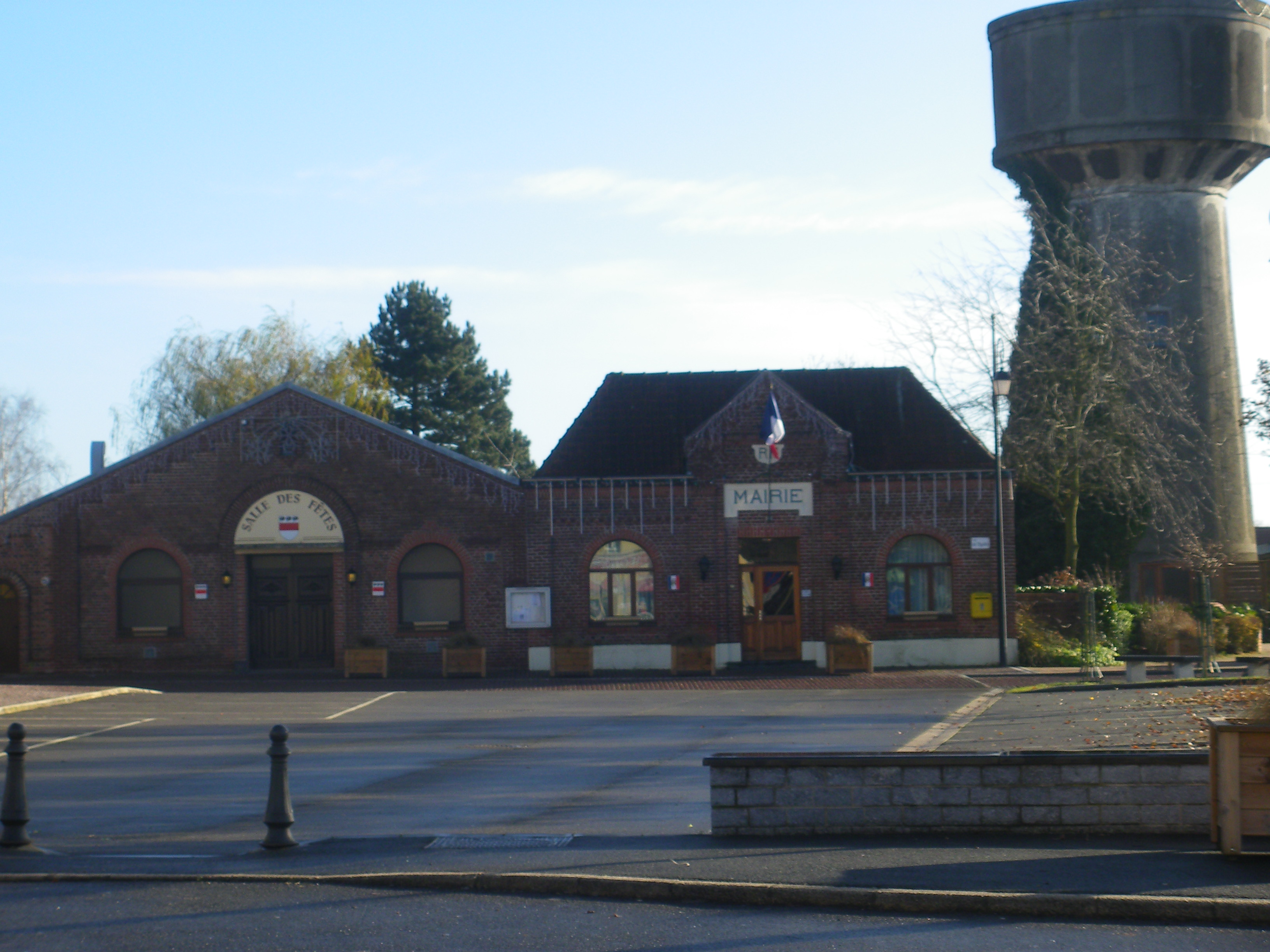
- The town hall of Locon

- Coat of arms
- Location of Locon
- Location within France Location within Hauts-de-France
- Coordinates: 50°34′15″N 2°40′03″E
- Country: France
- Region: Hauts-de-France
- Department: Pas-de-Calais
- Arrondissement: Béthune
- Canton: Beuvry
- Intercommunality: CA Béthune-Bruay, Artois-Lys Romane

Government
  - Mayor (2020–2026): Sylvie Rose-Bariselle
- Area^{1}: 9.52 km^{2} (3.68 sq mi)
- Elevation: 19 m (62 ft)
- Highest elevation: 20 m (66 ft)
- Lowest elevation: 17 m (56 ft)
- Population (2023): 2,324
  - Density: 244/km^{2} (632/sq mi)
- Time zone: UTC+01:00 (CET)
  - Summer (DST): UTC+02:00 (CEST)
- INSEE/Postal code: 62520 /62400
- ^{1} French Land Register data, which excludes lakes, ponds, glaciers > 1 km^{2} (0.386 sq mi or 247 acres) and river estuaries.

Locon (French pronunciation: [lɔkɔ̃]; West Flemish: Lockon) is a commune in the Pas-de-Calais department in the Hauts-de-France region of France about 5 miles (8.0 km) north of Béthune and 24 miles (39 km) west of Lille. The river Lawe flows through the eastern part of the commune.

== Population ==
Historical population
Year	Pop.	±% p.a.
1968	1,205	—
1975	1,393	+2.09%
1982	1,802	+3.75%
1990	2,156	+2.27%
1999	2,233	+0.39%
2007	2,427	+1.05%
2012	2,288	−1.17%
2017	2,465	+1.50%
2023	2,324	−0.98%
Source: INSEE

== Twin towns ==
- Oesbern, in Germany

== See also ==
- Communes of the Pas-de-Calais department
