= La Gorgue =

- Commune
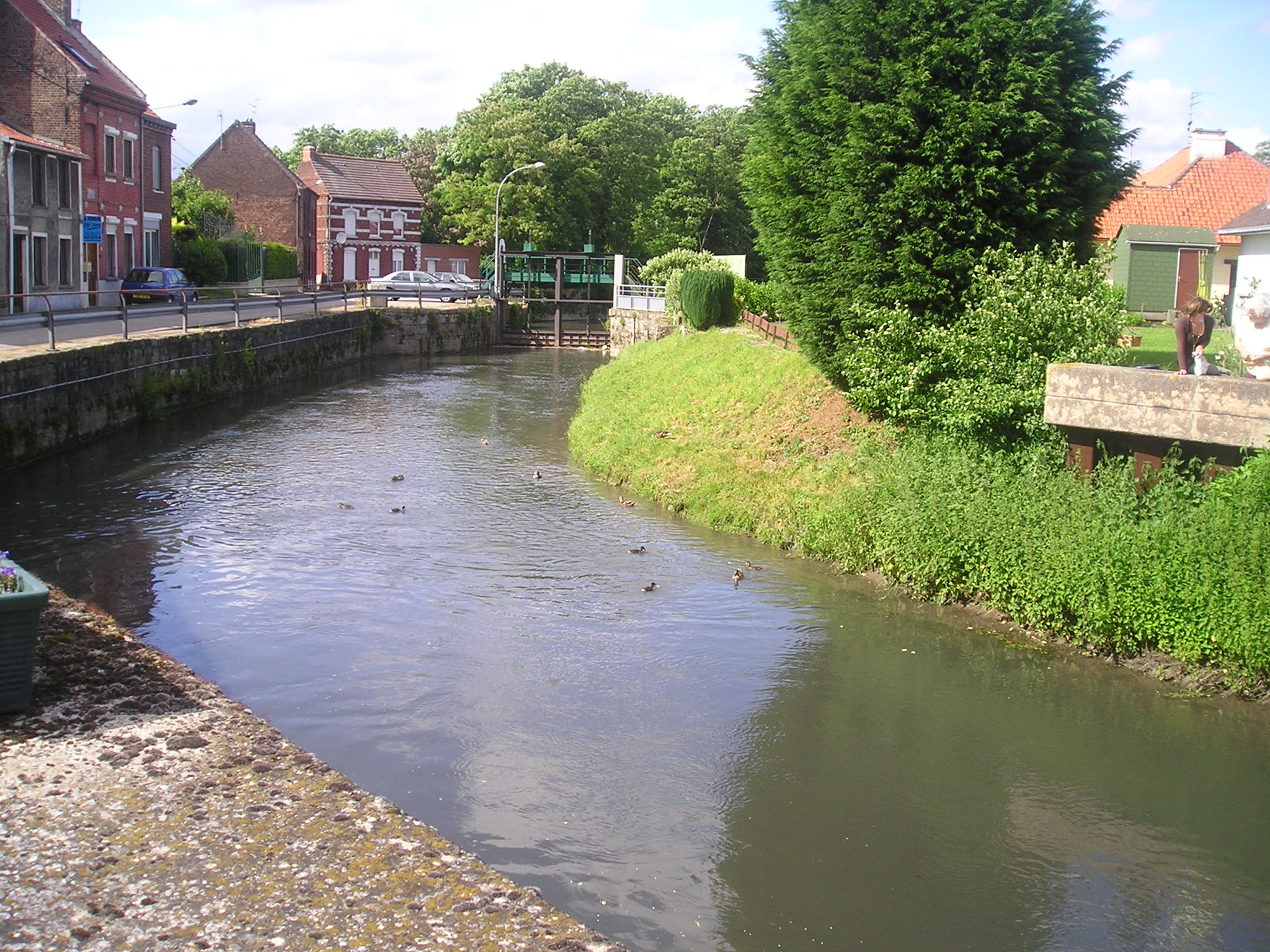
- The Lawe river in La Gorgue

- Coat of arms
- Location of La Gorgue
- Location within France Location within Hauts-de-France
- Coordinates: 50°38′16″N 2°43′03″E
- Country: France
- Region: Hauts-de-France
- Department: Nord
- Arrondissement: Dunkerque
- Canton: Hazebrouck
- Intercommunality: Flandre Lys

Government
  - Mayor (2020–2026): Philippe Mahieu
- Area^{1}: 15.03 km^{2} (5.80 sq mi)
- Elevation: 16 m (52 ft)
- Highest elevation: 19 m (62 ft)
- Lowest elevation: 12 m (39 ft)
- Population (2023): 5,616
  - Density: 373.7/km^{2} (967.8/sq mi)
- Demonym(s): Gorguillons, Gorguillonnes
- Time zone: UTC+01:00 (CET)
  - Summer (DST): UTC+02:00 (CEST)
- INSEE/Postal code: 59268 /59253
- ^{1} French Land Register data, which excludes lakes, ponds, glaciers > 1 km^{2} (0.386 sq mi or 247 acres) and river estuaries.

La Gorgue (French pronunciation: [la ɡɔʁɡ]) is a town in northern France. It is a commune in the Nord department, with about 5,600 inhabitants. It was the location of the Beaupré-sur-la-Lys Abbey, founded in 1221, whose grounds were used as a Royal Flying Corps base during World War I.

== History ==
Beaupré-sur-la-Lys Abbey is in La Gorgue. The monastery was founded in 1221 by two lords of Béthune, one of whom, Robert, was a constable of King John. After joining the Cistercian Order some years later, Beaupré and its community of nearly 40 nuns continued to live undisturbed French Revolution in 1789, when it was dismantled.

Later archaeological excavations revealed parts of the monastery, and much of this is now on exhibition in La Gorgue, including tombstones, decorated paving, coins and various archaeological artefacts.

During World War I, Beaupré farmland was used by the Royal Air Force as an aerodrome and was home to many squadrons, including No. 16 squadron under Hugh Dowding and No. 8 (Naval) Squadron, which became No. 208 Squadron RAF. From 12 May to 6 July 1917, No. 46 Squadron was based there. From 19 August to 5 October 1917, No. 35 Squadron was based at La Gorgue. Other squadrons based at La Gorgue at different times during the course of the war were No.5, No.15, No. 42 and No. 43.

In September 2018, the town hosted an exhibition and a ceremony attended by family members of pilots who had served at the aerodrome during the Great War, organised by Serge Comini.

La Gorgue is near the location of the Pont du Hem Military Cemetery.

== Location and governance ==
La Gorgue lies to the south of the river Lys, straddling its tributary the Lawe. The town is located about 33 kilometres (21 mi) west of Lille by road.

It is a commune in the Nord department, which lies within the region of Hauts-de-France, and the capital city of both the department and region is Lille. La Gorge lies within the arrondissement of Dunkerque, and the canton of Hazebrouck.

== Population ==
Historical population
Year	Pop.	±% p.a.
1968	4,104	—
1975	4,168	+0.22%
1982	4,602	+1.43%
1990	5,028	+1.11%
1999	5,215	+0.41%
2007	5,807	+1.35%
2012	5,923	+0.40%
2017	5,635	−0.99%
2023	5,616	−0.06%
Source: INSEE

== Heraldry ==
Arms of La Gorgue	The arms of La Gorgue are blazoned : Azure semy of escallops Or, on a chief argent, a demi-lion issuant from the line of division sable.

== See also ==
- Communes of the Nord department
- French Flanders
