= La Comté =

- Commune
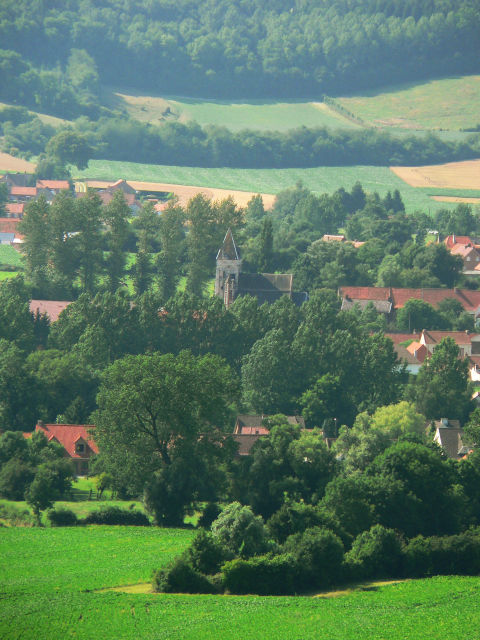
- A general view of La Comté

- Coat of arms
- Location of La Comté
- Location within France Location within Hauts-de-France
- Coordinates: 50°25′39″N 2°30′03″E
- Country: France
- Region: Hauts-de-France
- Department: Pas-de-Calais
- Arrondissement: Béthune
- Canton: Bruay-la-Buissière
- Intercommunality: CA Béthune-Bruay, Artois-Lys Romane

Government
  - Mayor (2020–2026): Joëlle Alleman
- Area^{1}: 6.63 km^{2} (2.56 sq mi)
- Elevation: 91 m (299 ft)
- Highest elevation: 193 m (633 ft)
- Lowest elevation: 70 m (230 ft)
- Population (2023): 879
  - Density: 133/km^{2} (343/sq mi)
- Time zone: UTC+01:00 (CET)
  - Summer (DST): UTC+02:00 (CEST)
- INSEE/Postal code: 62232 /62150
- ^{1} French Land Register data, which excludes lakes, ponds, glaciers > 1 km^{2} (0.386 sq mi or 247 acres) and river estuaries.

La Comté (French pronunciation: [la kɔ̃te]) is a commune in the Pas-de-Calais department in the Hauts-de-France region of France.

== Geography ==
La Comté is a farming and light industrial village situated 18 miles (29 km) northwest of Arras, at the junction of the D86 and the D86E roads, in the valley of the river Lawe.

== Population ==
Historical population
Year	Pop.	±% p.a.
1968	735	—
1975	734	−0.02%
1982	685	−0.98%
1990	755	+1.22%
1999	783	+0.41%
2007	835	+0.81%
2012	830	−0.12%
2017	935	+2.41%
2023	879	−1.02%
Source: INSEE

== Places of interest ==
- The church of St.Martin, dating from the sixteenth century.
- An eighteenth-century farmhouse, at a site known as the old castle.

== See also ==
- Communes of the Pas-de-Calais department
