= Canton of Bruay-la-Buissière =

Coordinates: 50.4819°N 2.5486°E

The Canton of Bruay-la-Buissière is one of the 39 cantons of the Pas-de-Calais department, in northern France. At the French canton reorganisation which came into effect in March 2015, the canton was expanded from 1 to 12 communes.

It consists of the following communes:

| INSEE | Commune | Population (2022) | Land Area (km^{2}) |
|---|---|---|---|
| 62178 | Bruay-la-Buissière | 21,997 | 16.35 |
| 62077 | Bajus | 358 | 2.94 |
| 62120 | Beugin | 465 | 5.06 |
| 62218 | Caucourt | 332 | 5.51 |
| 62232 | La Comté | 884 | 6.63 |
| 62314 | Estrée-Cauchy | 353 | 3.89 |
| 62356 | Fresnicourt-le-Dolmen | 808 | 7.95 |
| 62366 | Gauchin-Légal | 300 | 6.03 |
| 62441 | Hermin | 207 | 4.19 |
| 62457 | Houdain | 6,990 | 6.3 |
| 62540 | Maisnil-lès-Ruitz | 1,685 | 5.56 |
| 62693 | Rebreuve-Ranchicourt | 1,071 | 10.73 |
