= Hermin =

- Commune
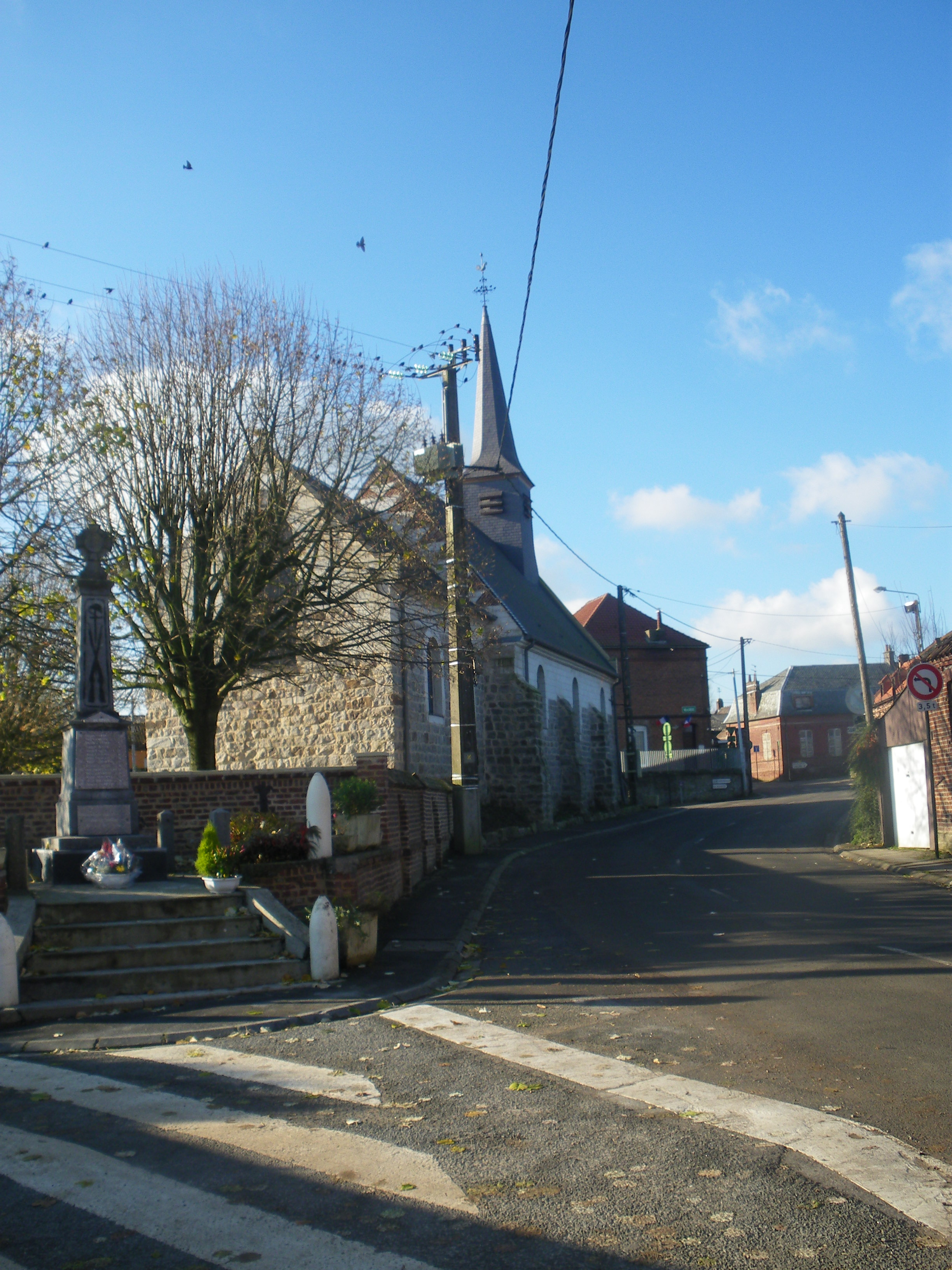
- The centre of Hermin

- Coat of arms
- Location of Hermin
- Location within France Location within Hauts-de-France
- Coordinates: 50°25′09″N 2°33′36″E
- Country: France
- Region: Hauts-de-France
- Department: Pas-de-Calais
- Arrondissement: Béthune
- Canton: Bruay-la-Buissière
- Intercommunality: CA Béthune-Bruay, Artois-Lys Romane

Government
  - Mayor (2020–2026): Jean-Luc Leclercq
- Area^{1}: 4.19 km^{2} (1.62 sq mi)
- Elevation: 112 m (367 ft)
- Highest elevation: 165 m (541 ft)
- Lowest elevation: 89 m (292 ft)
- Population (2023): 206
  - Density: 49.2/km^{2} (127/sq mi)
- Time zone: UTC+01:00 (CET)
  - Summer (DST): UTC+02:00 (CEST)
- INSEE/Postal code: 62441 /62150
- ^{1} French Land Register data, which excludes lakes, ponds, glaciers > 1 km^{2} (0.386 sq mi or 247 acres) and river estuaries.

Hermin (French pronunciation: [ɛʁmɛ̃]) is a commune in the Pas-de-Calais department in the Hauts-de-France region of France about 14 miles (23 km) northwest of Arras. A small stream, the Hermin, flows through the commune.

== Population ==
Historical population
Year	Pop.	±% p.a.
1968	219	—
1975	203	−1.08%
1982	189	−1.02%
1990	204	+0.96%
1999	199	−0.28%
2007	215	+0.97%
2012	211	−0.37%
2017	213	+0.19%
2023	206	−0.56%
Source: INSEE

== See also ==
- Communes of the Pas-de-Calais department
