= Cauchy-à-la-Tour =

- Commune
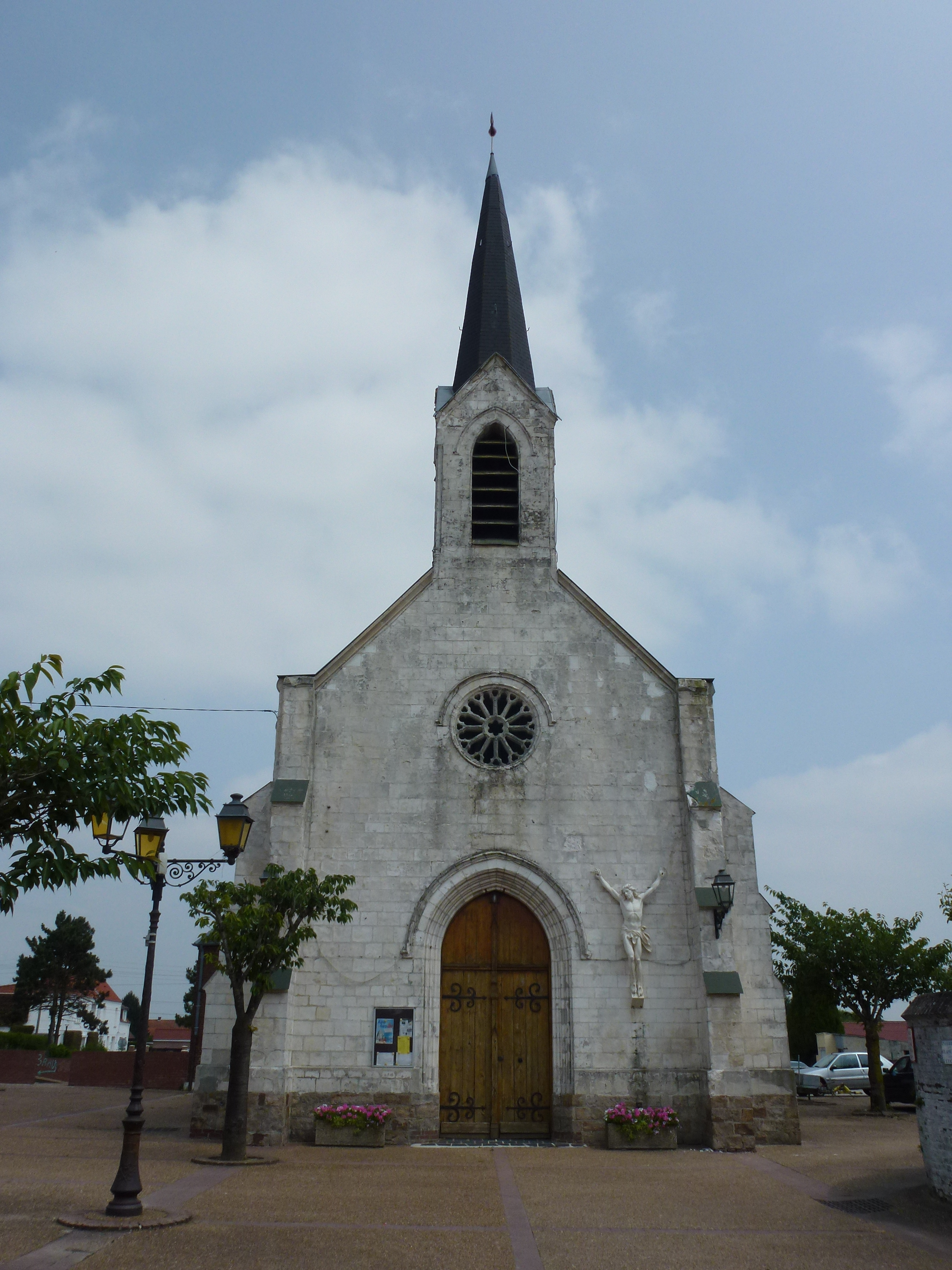
- The church of Cauchy-à-la-Tour

- Coat of arms
- Location of Cauchy-à-la-Tour
- Location within France Location within Hauts-de-France
- Coordinates: 50°30′16″N 2°27′09″E
- Country: France
- Region: Hauts-de-France
- Department: Pas-de-Calais
- Arrondissement: Béthune
- Canton: Auchel
- Intercommunality: CA Béthune-Bruay, Artois-Lys Romane

Government
  - Mayor (2020–2026): Jacques Flahaut
- Area^{1}: 3.13 km^{2} (1.21 sq mi)
- Elevation: 115 m (377 ft)
- Highest elevation: 116 m (381 ft)
- Lowest elevation: 82 m (269 ft)
- Population (2023): 2,593
  - Density: 828/km^{2} (2,150/sq mi)
- Time zone: UTC+01:00 (CET)
  - Summer (DST): UTC+02:00 (CEST)
- INSEE/Postal code: 62217 /62260
- ^{1} French Land Register data, which excludes lakes, ponds, glaciers > 1 km^{2} (0.386 sq mi or 247 acres) and river estuaries.

Cauchy-à-la-Tour (French pronunciation: [koʃi a la tuʁ]; Picard: El-Cauchie-à-l’Tour; Dutch:"Turringhem" (house of the sons of Turr)) is a commune in the Pas-de-Calais department in the Hauts-de-France region of France 10 miles (16 km) southwest of Béthune and 30 miles (48 km) southwest of Lille.

== Population ==
Historical population
Year	Pop.	±% p.a.
1968	2,997	—
1975	2,696	−1.50%
1982	2,712	+0.08%
1990	2,907	+0.87%
1999	2,856	−0.20%
2007	2,941	+0.37%
2012	2,935	−0.04%
2017	2,814	−0.84%
2023	2,593	−1.35%
Source: INSEE

== Notable people ==
- Philippe Pétain, was born here on the 24 April 1856.

== See also ==
- Communes of the Pas-de-Calais department
