= Divion =

- Commune
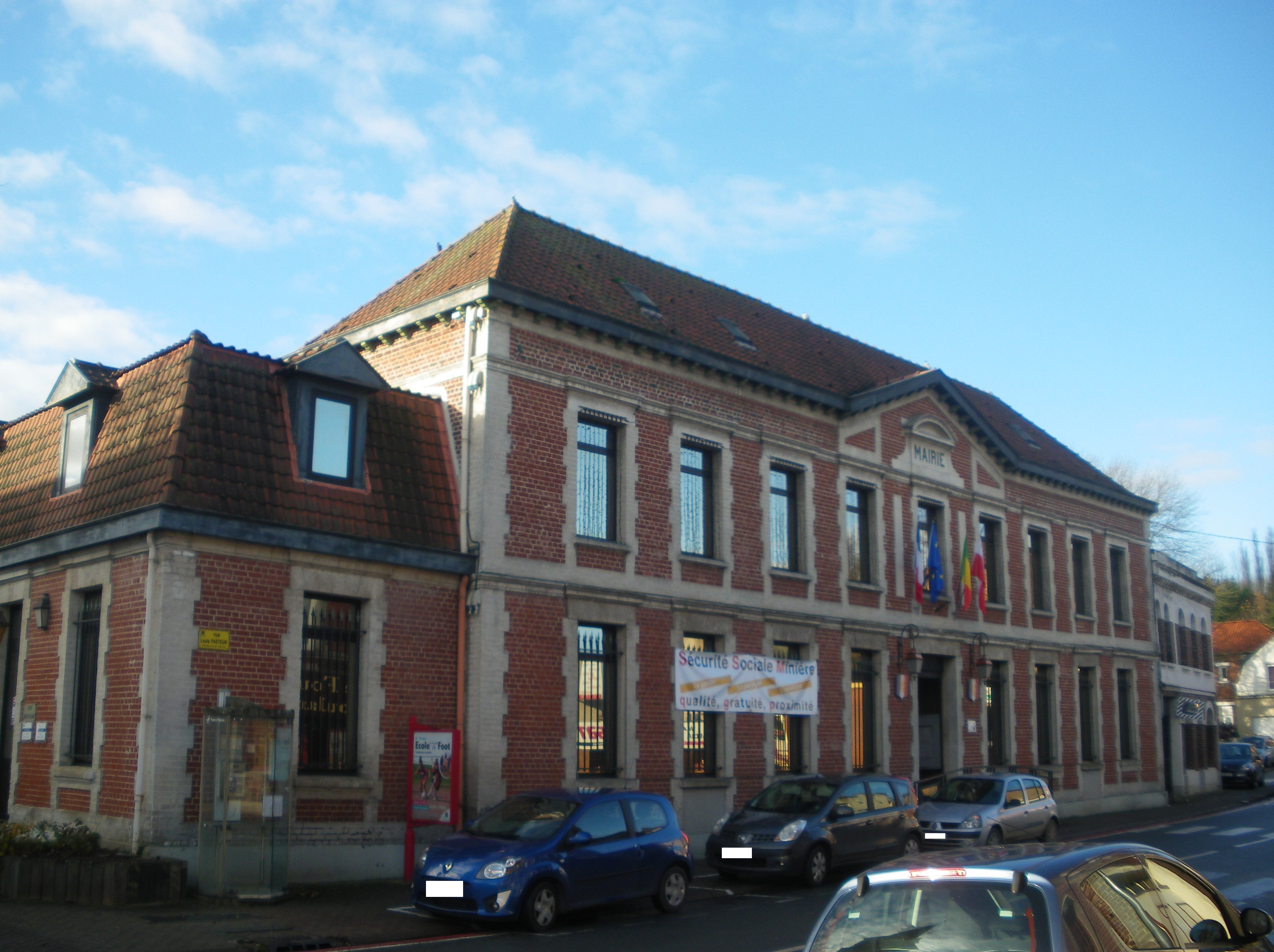
- Divion Town Hall

- Coat of arms
- Location of Divion
- Location within France Location within Hauts-de-France
- Coordinates: 50°28′23″N 2°30′09″E
- Country: France
- Region: Hauts-de-France
- Department: Pas-de-Calais
- Arrondissement: Béthune
- Canton: Auchel
- Intercommunality: CA Béthune-Bruay, Artois-Lys Romane

Government
  - Mayor (2020–2026): Jacky Lemoine
- Area^{1}: 10.96 km^{2} (4.23 sq mi)
- Elevation: 57 m (187 ft)
- Highest elevation: 138 m (453 ft)
- Lowest elevation: 37 m (121 ft)
- Population (2023): 6,766
  - Density: 617.3/km^{2} (1,599/sq mi)
- Time zone: UTC+01:00 (CET)
  - Summer (DST): UTC+02:00 (CEST)
- INSEE/Postal code: 62270 /62460
- ^{1} French Land Register data, which excludes lakes, ponds, glaciers > 1 km^{2} (0.386 sq mi or 247 acres) and river estuaries.

Divion (French pronunciation: [divjɔ̃]) is a commune and in the Pas-de-Calais department in the Hauts-de-France region of France about 5 miles (8.0 km) southwest of Béthune and 34 miles (55 km) southwest of Lille.

== Population ==
Historical population
Year	Pop.	±% p.a.
1968	10,407	—
1975	8,588	−2.71%
1982	8,125	−0.79%
1990	7,642	−0.76%
1999	7,150	−0.74%
2007	6,935	−0.38%
2012	6,812	−0.36%
2017	6,978	+0.48%
2023	6,766	−0.51%
Source: INSEE

== See also ==
- Communes of the Pas-de-Calais department
