= Lozinghem =

- Commune
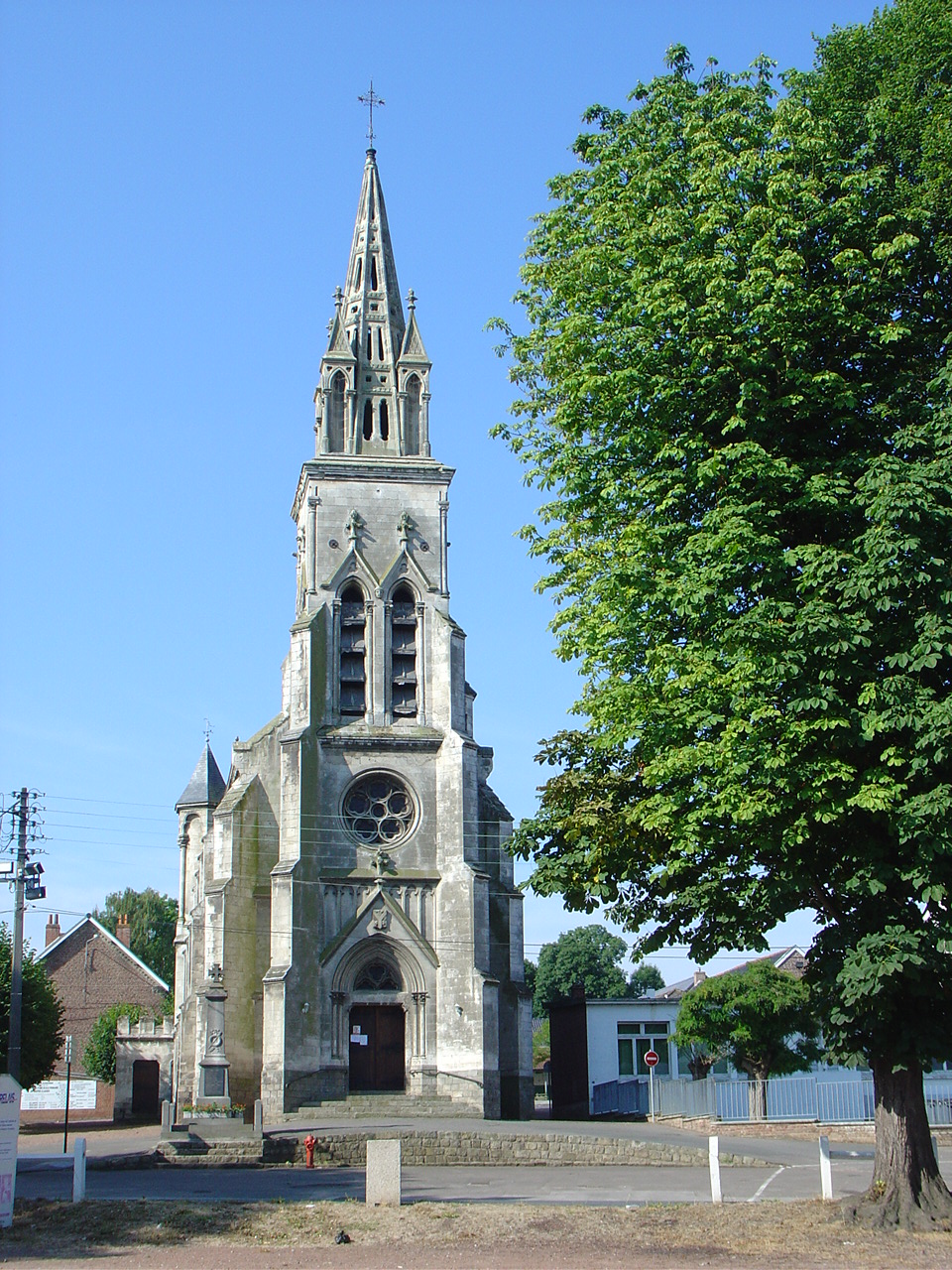
- The church of Lozinghem

- Coat of arms
- Location of Lozinghem
- Location within France Location within Hauts-de-France
- Coordinates: 50°31′06″N 2°30′03″E
- Country: France
- Region: Hauts-de-France
- Department: Pas-de-Calais
- Arrondissement: Béthune
- Canton: Auchel
- Intercommunality: CA Béthune-Bruay, Artois-Lys Romane

Government
  - Mayor (2020–2026): Marie-Josèphe Delannoy
- Area^{1}: 2.15 km^{2} (0.83 sq mi)
- Elevation: 67 m (220 ft)
- Highest elevation: 99 m (325 ft)
- Lowest elevation: 38 m (125 ft)
- Population (2023): 1,256
  - Density: 584/km^{2} (1,510/sq mi)
- Time zone: UTC+01:00 (CET)
  - Summer (DST): UTC+02:00 (CEST)
- INSEE/Postal code: 62532 /62540
- ^{1} French Land Register data, which excludes lakes, ponds, glaciers > 1 km^{2} (0.386 sq mi or 247 acres) and river estuaries.

Lozinghem (French pronunciation: [lozɛ̃ɡɛm]; Picard: Lozinghin) is a commune in the Pas-de-Calais department in the Hauts-de-France region of France.

== Geography ==
Lozinghem is situated some 7 miles (11 km) west of Béthune and 33 miles (53 km) southwest of Lille, at the junction of the D188 and D183 roads.

== Population ==
Historical population
Year	Pop.	±% p.a.
1968	1,231	—
1975	1,169	−0.74%
1982	1,104	−0.81%
1990	1,055	−0.57%
1999	1,032	−0.24%
2007	1,161	+1.48%
2012	1,264	+1.71%
2017	1,262	−0.03%
2023	1,256	−0.08%
Source: INSEE

== Places of interest ==
- A sixteenth century manorhouse.
- A farmhouse dating from the seventeenth century.
- The church of St. Riquier, built in 1866.
- A chapel

== See also ==
- Communes of the Pas-de-Calais department
