= Camblain-Châtelain =

- Commune
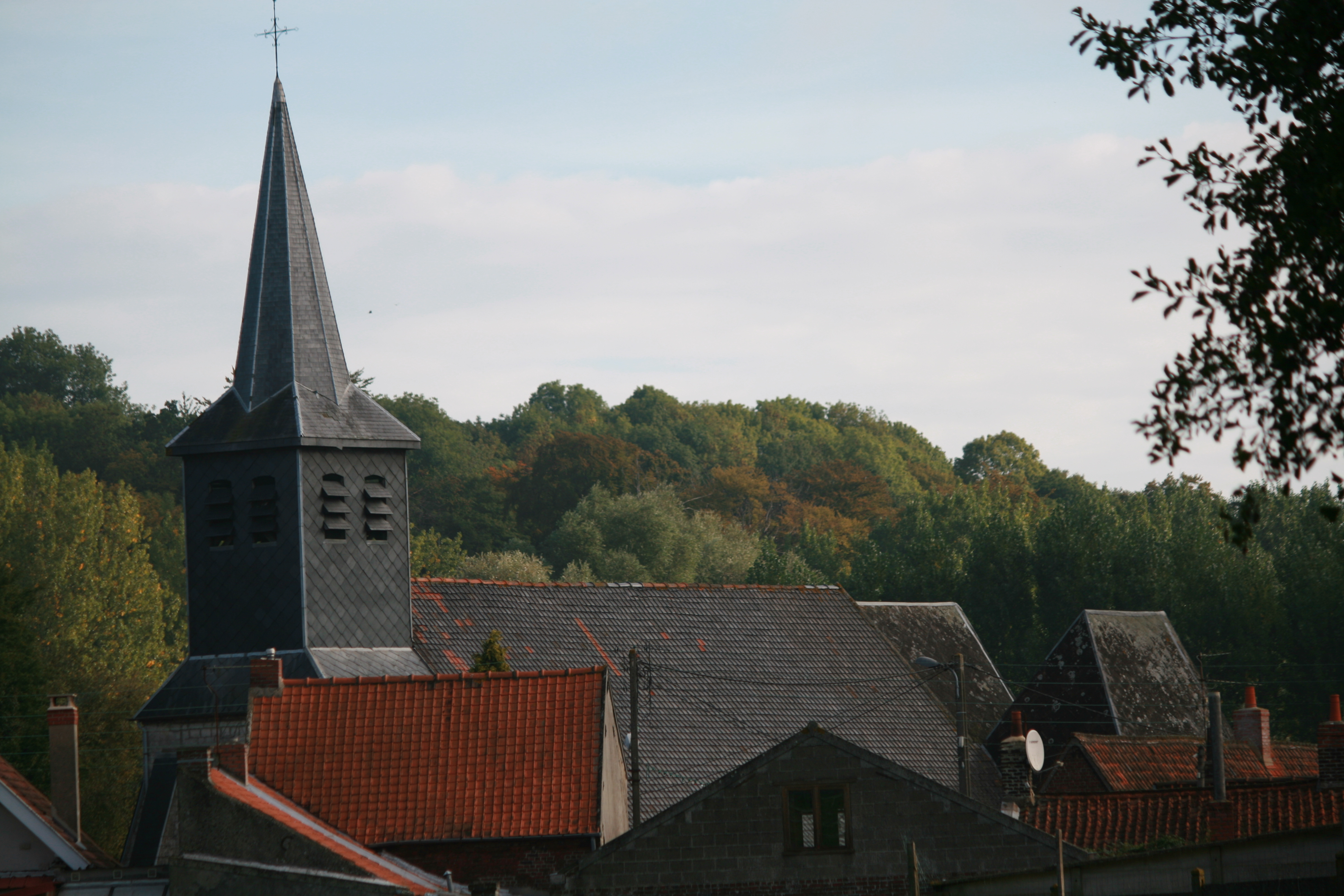
- The church of Camblain-Châtelain

- Coat of arms
- Location of Camblain-Châtelain
- Location within France Location within Hauts-de-France
- Coordinates: 50°28′58″N 2°27′50″E
- Country: France
- Region: Hauts-de-France
- Department: Pas-de-Calais
- Arrondissement: Béthune
- Canton: Auchel
- Intercommunality: CA Béthune-Bruay, Artois-Lys Romane

Government
  - Mayor (2020–2026): Lelio Pedrini
- Area^{1}: 10.04 km^{2} (3.88 sq mi)
- Elevation: 85 m (279 ft)
- Highest elevation: 177 m (581 ft)
- Lowest elevation: 51 m (167 ft)
- Population (2023): 1,762
  - Density: 175.5/km^{2} (454.5/sq mi)
- Time zone: UTC+01:00 (CET)
  - Summer (DST): UTC+02:00 (CEST)
- INSEE/Postal code: 62197 /62470
- ^{1} French Land Register data, which excludes lakes, ponds, glaciers > 1 km^{2} (0.386 sq mi or 247 acres) and river estuaries.

Camblain-Châtelain (French pronunciation: [kɑ̃blɛ̃ ʃatlɛ̃]) is a commune in the Pas-de-Calais department in the Hauts-de-France region of France.

== Geography ==
Camblain-Châtelain is a farming and light industrial village some 7 miles (11 km) southwest of Béthune and 33 miles (53 km) southwest of Lille, at the junction of the D341 and the D70 roads, by the banks of the river Clarence.

== Population ==
Historical population
Year	Pop.	±% p.a.
1968	1,956	—
1975	1,880	−0.56%
1982	1,710	−1.34%
1990	1,629	−0.60%
1999	1,581	−0.33%
2007	1,607	+0.20%
2012	1,763	+1.87%
2017	1,764	+0.01%
2023	1,762	−0.02%
Source: INSEE

== Places of interest ==
- The church of St.Vaast, dating from the fifteenth century.
- Ruins of an 11th-century castle.

== See also ==
- Communes of the Pas-de-Calais department
