= Beugin =

Beugin Belgin
- Commune
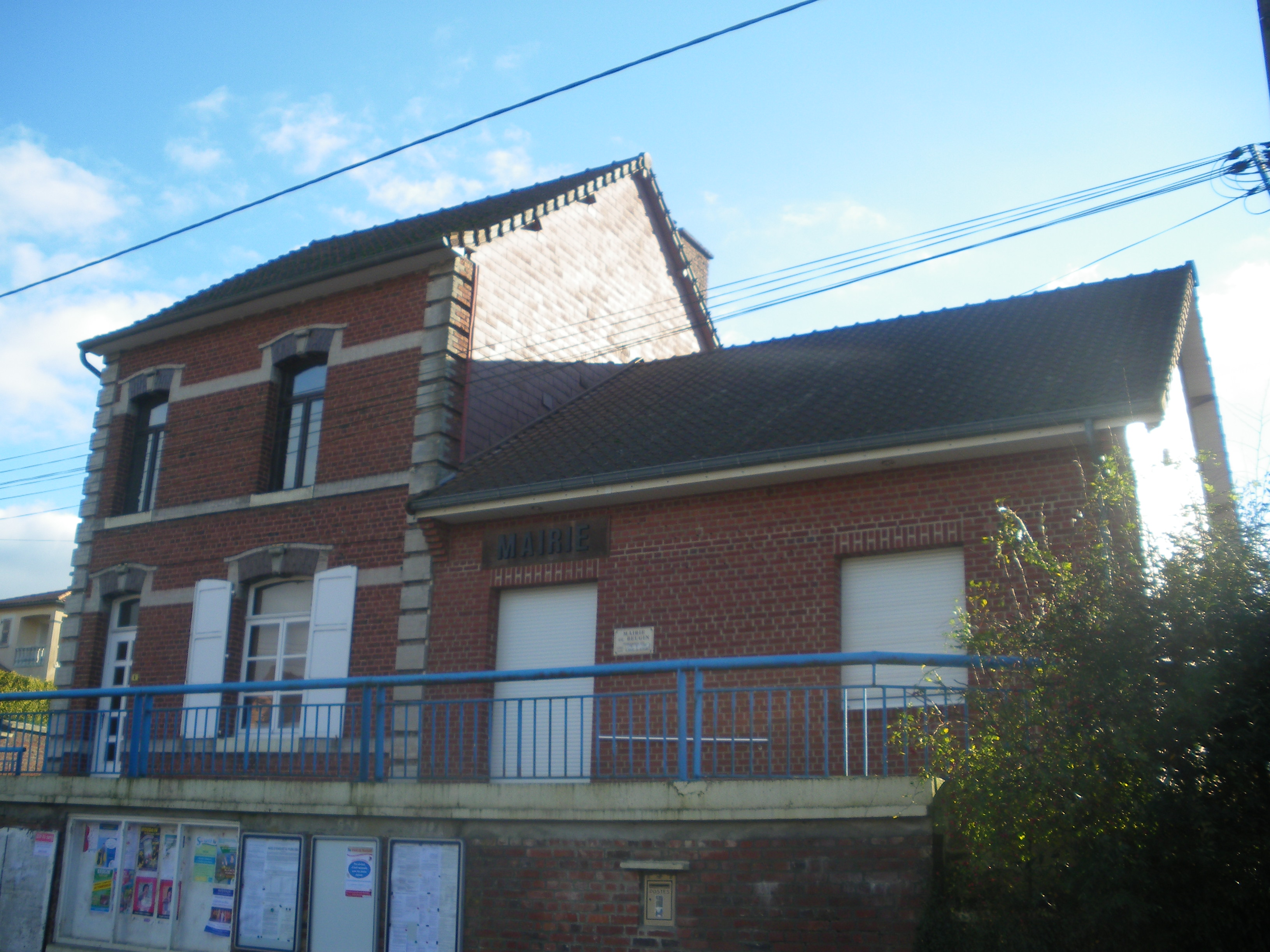
- The town hall of Beugin

- Coat of arms
- Location of Beugin
- Location within France Location within Hauts-de-France
- Coordinates: 50°26′34″N 2°31′06″E
- Country: France
- Region: Hauts-de-France
- Department: Pas-de-Calais
- Arrondissement: Béthune
- Canton: Bruay-la-Buissière
- Intercommunality: CA Béthune-Bruay, Artois-Lys Romane

Government
  - Mayor (2020–2026): Odile Leclercq
- Area^{1}: 5.06 km^{2} (1.95 sq mi)
- Elevation: 72 m (236 ft)
- Highest elevation: 147 m (482 ft)
- Lowest elevation: 55 m (180 ft)
- Population (2023): 460
  - Density: 91/km^{2} (240/sq mi)
- Time zone: UTC+01:00 (CET)
  - Summer (DST): UTC+02:00 (CEST)
- INSEE/Postal code: 62120 /62150
- ^{1} French Land Register data, which excludes lakes, ponds, glaciers > 1 km^{2} (0.386 sq mi or 247 acres) and river estuaries.

Beugin (French pronunciation: [bøʒɛ̃]; West Flemish: Belgin) is a commune in the Pas-de-Calais department in the Hauts-de-France region in northern France.

== Geography ==
A farming village situated 8 miles (13 km) southwest of Béthune and 30 miles (48 km) southwest of Lille, on the D86 road.

== Population ==
Historical population
Year	Pop.	±% p.a.
1968	403	—
1975	376	−0.99%
1982	416	+1.45%
1990	407	−0.27%
1999	413	+0.16%
2007	443	+0.88%
2012	454	+0.49%
2017	471	+0.74%
2023	460	−0.39%
Source: INSEE

== Sights ==
- The church of St. Remi, dating from the nineteenth century.
- An artificial lake with pink sandstone cliffs.

== See also ==
- Communes of the Pas-de-Calais department
