= Maisnil-lès-Ruitz =

- Commune
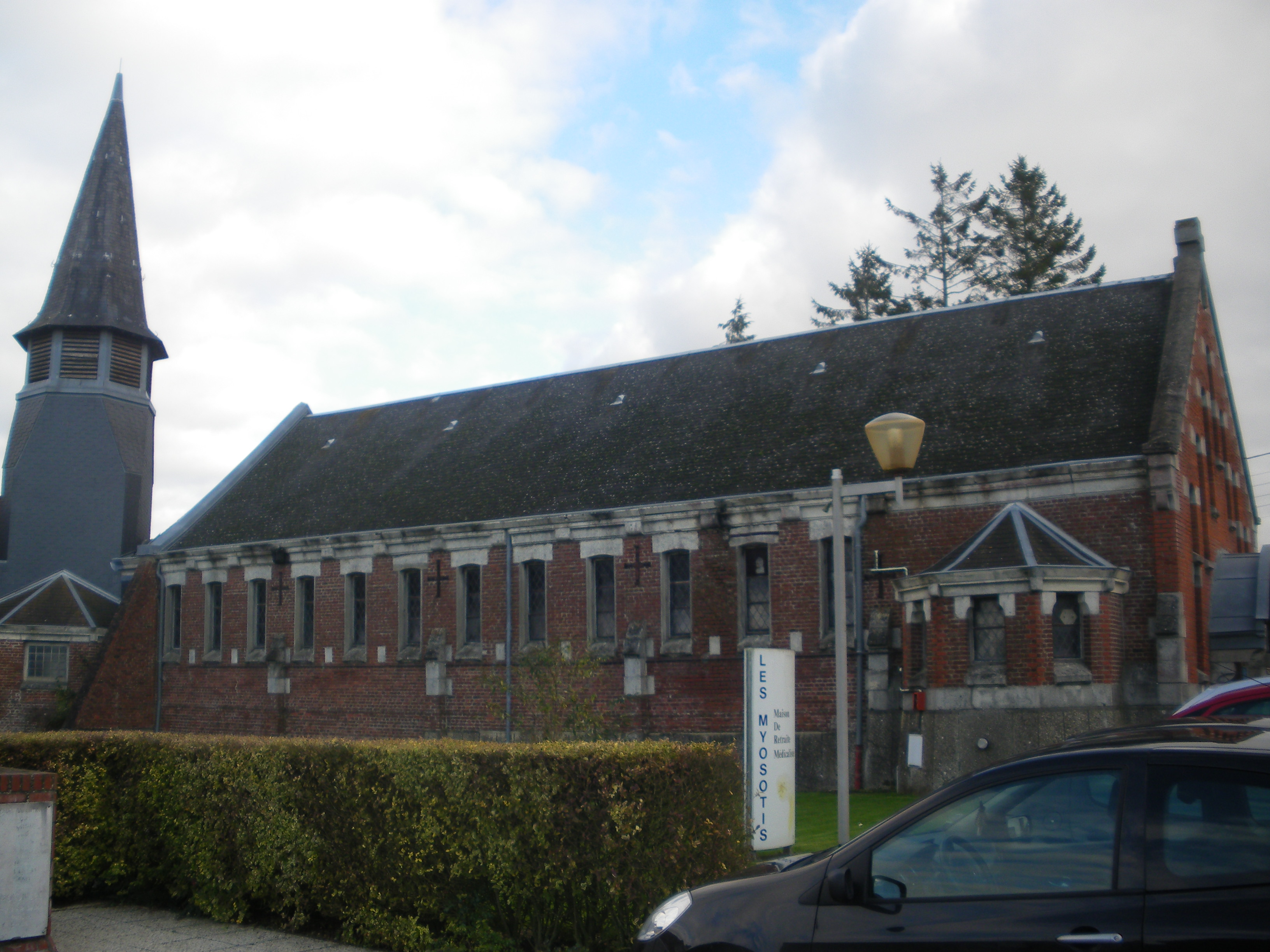
- The church of Maisnil-lès-Ruitz

- Coat of arms
- Location of Maisnil-lès-Ruitz
- Location within France Location within Hauts-de-France
- Coordinates: 50°27′10″N 2°35′09″E
- Country: France
- Region: Hauts-de-France
- Department: Pas-de-Calais
- Arrondissement: Béthune
- Canton: Bruay-la-Buissière
- Intercommunality: CA Béthune-Bruay, Artois-Lys Romane

Government
  - Mayor (2020–2026): Marcel Pruvost
- Area^{1}: 5.56 km^{2} (2.15 sq mi)
- Elevation: 150 m (490 ft)
- Highest elevation: 181 m (594 ft)
- Lowest elevation: 91 m (299 ft)
- Population (2023): 1,678
  - Density: 302/km^{2} (782/sq mi)
- Time zone: UTC+01:00 (CET)
  - Summer (DST): UTC+02:00 (CEST)
- INSEE/Postal code: 62540 /62620
- ^{1} French Land Register data, which excludes lakes, ponds, glaciers > 1 km^{2} (0.386 sq mi or 247 acres) and river estuaries.

Maisnil-lès-Ruitz (French pronunciation: [mɛnil lɛ ʁɥi], literally Maisnil near Ruitz) is a commune in the Pas-de-Calais department in the Hauts-de-France region of France.

== Geography ==
Maisnil-lès-Ruitz is situated some 5 miles (8.0 km) south of Béthune and 35 miles (56 km) southwest of Lille, at the junction of the D72, D301 and D179 roads.

== Population ==
Historical population
Year	Pop.	±% p.a.
1968	1,287	—
1975	1,205	−0.94%
1982	1,192	−0.15%
1990	1,235	+0.44%
1999	1,215	−0.18%
2007	1,431	+2.07%
2012	1,567	+1.83%
2017	1,680	+1.40%
2023	1,678	−0.02%
Source: INSEE

== Places of interest ==
- An eighteenth-century manorhouse.
- The church of St. Sébastien, dating from the seventeenth century.

== See also ==
- Communes of the Pas-de-Calais department
