= Rebreuve-Ranchicourt =

- Commune
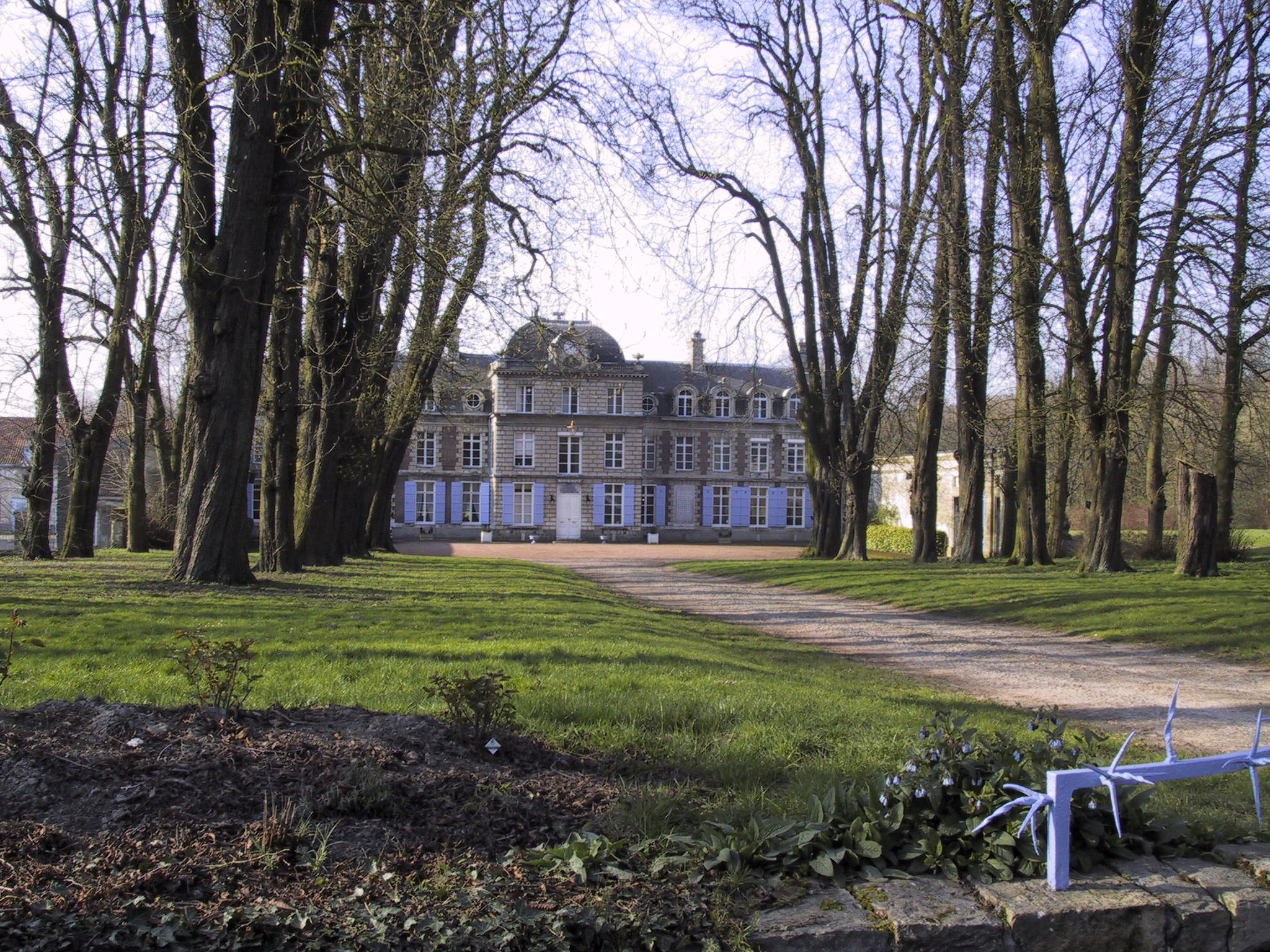
- Chateau

- Coat of arms
- Location of Rebreuve-Ranchicourt
- Location within France Location within Hauts-de-France
- Coordinates: 50°26′15″N 2°33′22″E
- Country: France
- Region: Hauts-de-France
- Department: Pas-de-Calais
- Arrondissement: Béthune
- Canton: Bruay-la-Buissière
- Intercommunality: CA Béthune-Bruay, Artois-Lys Romane

Government
  - Mayor (2020–2026): Danielle Mannessiez
- Area^{1}: 10.73 km^{2} (4.14 sq mi)
- Elevation: 65 m (213 ft)
- Highest elevation: 185 m (607 ft)
- Lowest elevation: 58 m (190 ft)
- Population (2023): 1,071
  - Density: 99.81/km^{2} (258.5/sq mi)
- Time zone: UTC+01:00 (CET)
  - Summer (DST): UTC+02:00 (CEST)
- INSEE/Postal code: 62693 /62150
- ^{1} French Land Register data, which excludes lakes, ponds, glaciers > 1 km^{2} (0.386 sq mi or 247 acres) and river estuaries.

Rebreuve-Ranchicourt (French pronunciation: [ʁəbʁœv ʁɑ̃ʃikuʁ]; Picard: Arbreuve-Ranchecourt) is a commune in the Pas-de-Calais department in the Hauts-de-France region of France.

== Geography ==
Rebreuve-Ranchicourt is situated about 8 miles (13 km) southwest of Béthune and 36 miles (58 km) southwest of Lille, at the junction of the D341 (an old Roman road, the Chaussée Brunehaut) and the D57 road. The commune was created in 1971 by the joining of the former communes Rebreuve-sous-les-Monts and Ranchicourt.

== Population ==
Historical population
| Year | Pop. | ±% p.a. |
|---|---|---|
| 1968 | 933 | — |
| 1975 | 951 | +0.27% |
| 1982 | 892 | −0.91% |
| 1990 | 1,024 | +1.74% |
| 1999 | 1,061 | +0.40% |
| 2007 | 1,099 | +0.44% |
| 2012 | 1,101 | +0.04% |
| 2017 | 1,074 | −0.50% |
| 2023 | 1,071 | −0.05% |
Source: INSEE

== Places of interest ==
- The church of Notre-Dame, dating from the nineteenth century.
- An eighteenth-century manorhouse.
- The church of St.Pierre, dating from the fifteenth century.
- The nineteenth-century château de Ranchicourt with an older dovecote and other outbuildings.

== See also ==
- Communes of the Pas-de-Calais department
