= Marles-les-Mines =

- Commune
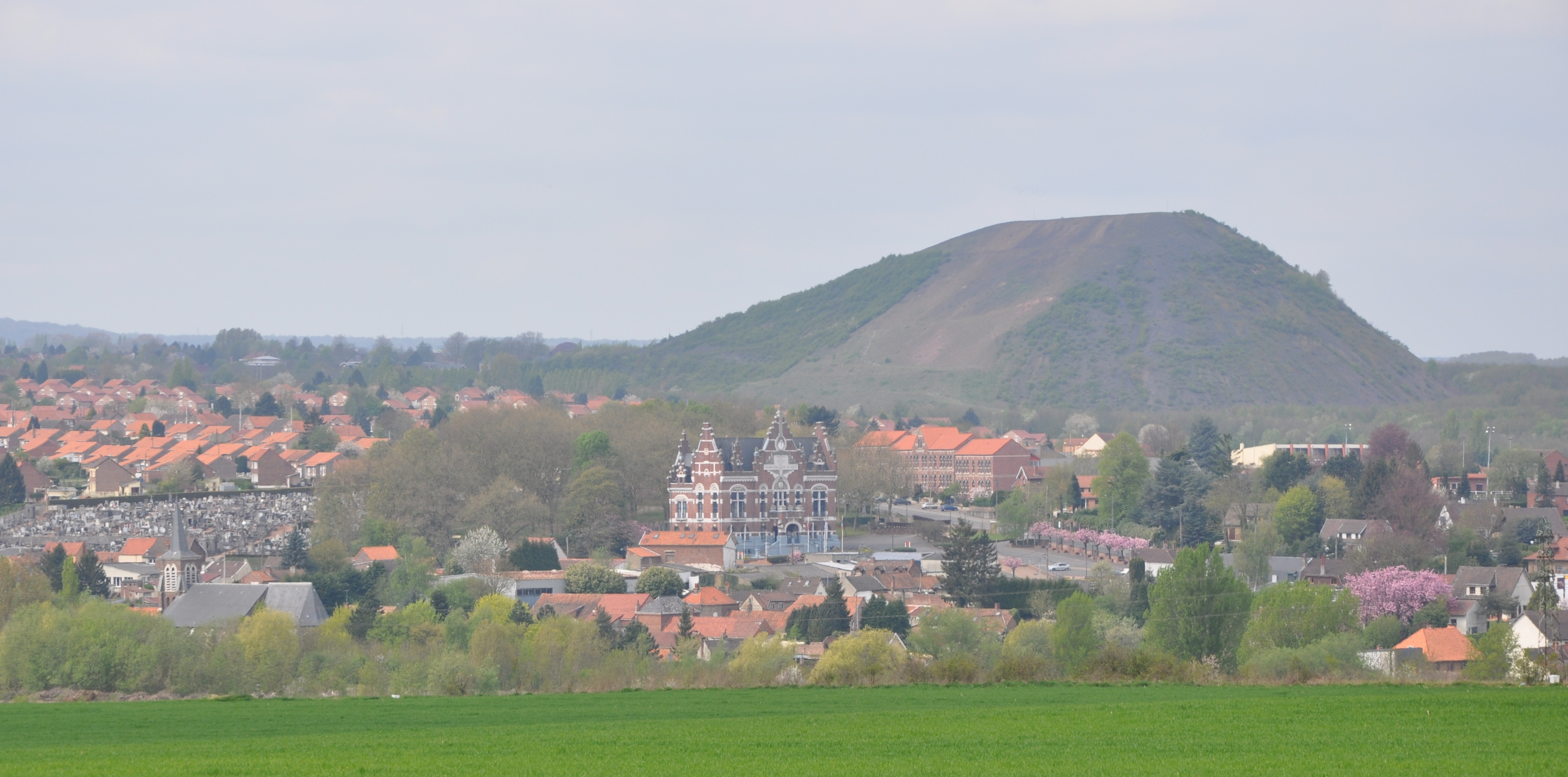
- A general view of Marles les Mines

- Coat of arms
- Location of Marles-les-Mines
- Location within France Location within Hauts-de-France
- Coordinates: 50°30′10″N 2°30′11″E
- Country: France
- Region: Hauts-de-France
- Department: Pas-de-Calais
- Arrondissement: Béthune
- Canton: Auchel
- Intercommunality: CA Béthune-Bruay, Artois-Lys Romane

Government
  - Mayor (2023–2026): Karine Toursel-Deruelle
- Area^{1}: 4.55 km^{2} (1.76 sq mi)
- Elevation: 40 m (130 ft)
- Highest elevation: 99 m (325 ft)
- Lowest elevation: 37 m (121 ft)
- Population (2023): 5,411
  - Density: 1,190/km^{2} (3,080/sq mi)
- Time zone: UTC+01:00 (CET)
  - Summer (DST): UTC+02:00 (CEST)
- INSEE/Postal code: 62555 /62540
- ^{1} French Land Register data, which excludes lakes, ponds, glaciers > 1 km^{2} (0.386 sq mi or 247 acres) and river estuaries.

Marles-les-Mines (French pronunciation: [maʁl le min]) is a commune in the Pas-de-Calais department in the Hauts-de-France region of France about 5 miles (8.0 km) southwest of Béthune and 36 miles (58 km) southwest of Lille. The river Clarence flows through the commune. Vis-à-Marles station is the local train station.

== Population ==
Historical population
Year	Pop.	±% p.a.
1968	9,942	—
1975	7,938	−3.16%
1982	7,327	−1.14%
1990	6,790	−0.95%
1999	6,088	−1.21%
2007	5,766	−0.68%
2012	5,777	+0.04%
2017	5,579	−0.70%
2023	5,411	−0.51%
Source: INSEE

== See also ==
- Communes of the Pas-de-Calais department
