= Diéval =

- Commune
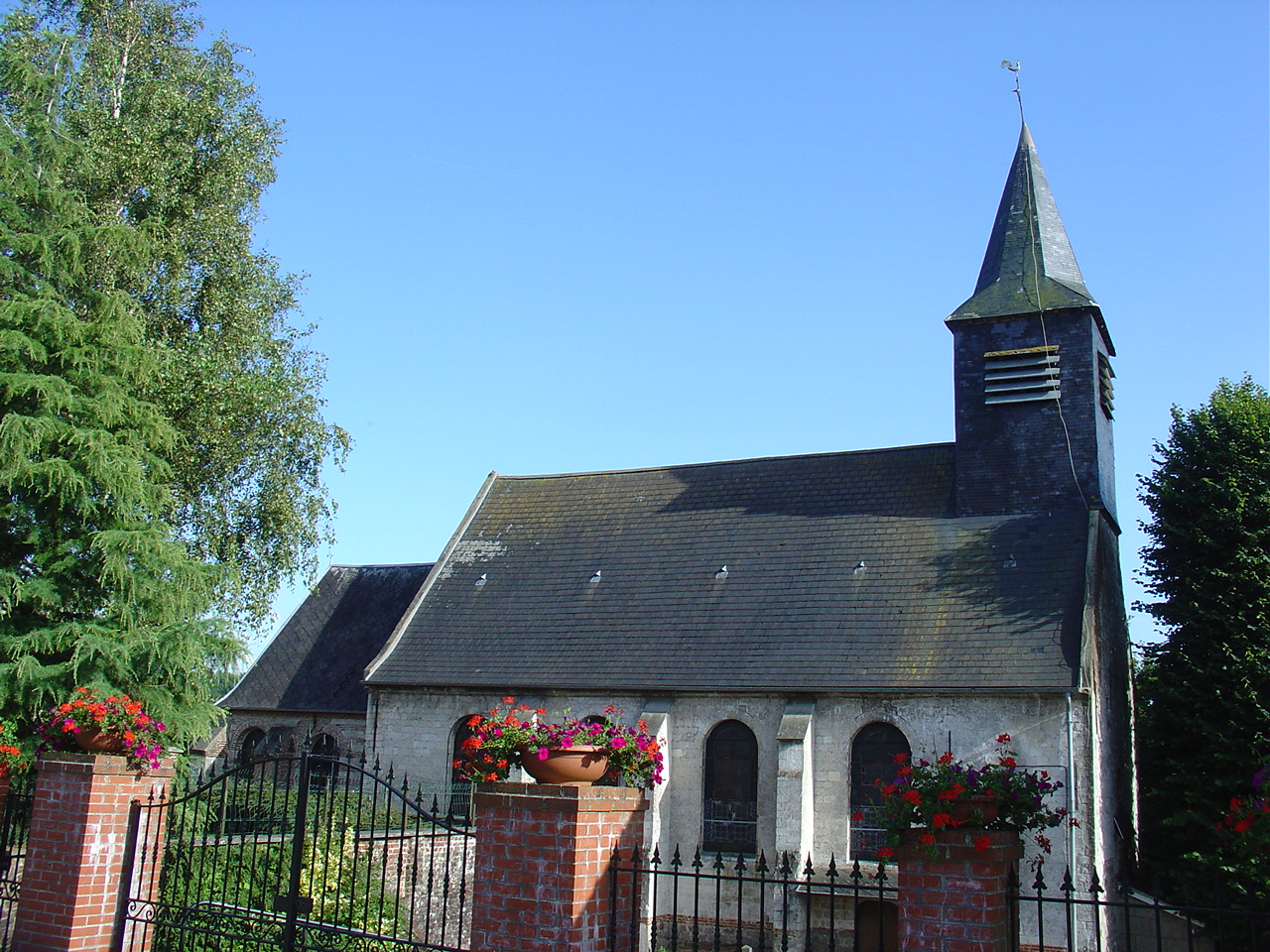
- The church of Diéval

- Coat of arms
- Location of Diéval
- Location within France Location within Hauts-de-France
- Coordinates: 50°26′07″N 2°27′00″E
- Country: France
- Region: Hauts-de-France
- Department: Pas-de-Calais
- Arrondissement: Béthune
- Canton: Auchel
- Intercommunality: CA Béthune-Bruay, Artois-Lys Romane

Government
  - Mayor (2020–2026): Jean Neveu
- Area^{1}: 12 km^{2} (4.6 sq mi)
- Elevation: 140 m (460 ft)
- Highest elevation: 184 m (604 ft)
- Lowest elevation: 93 m (305 ft)
- Population (2023): 709
  - Density: 59/km^{2} (150/sq mi)
- Time zone: UTC+01:00 (CET)
  - Summer (DST): UTC+02:00 (CEST)
- INSEE/Postal code: 62269 /62460
- ^{1} French Land Register data, which excludes lakes, ponds, glaciers > 1 km^{2} (0.386 sq mi or 247 acres) and river estuaries.

Diéval (French pronunciation: [djeval]) is a commune in the Pas-de-Calais department in the Hauts-de-France region of France 18 miles (29 km) northwest of Arras.

== Population ==
Historical population
Year	Pop.	±% p.a.
1968	699	—
1975	678	−0.43%
1982	656	−0.47%
1990	653	−0.06%
1999	665	+0.20%
2007	710	+0.82%
2012	782	+1.95%
2017	750	−0.83%
2023	709	−0.93%
Source: INSEE

== See also ==
- Communes of the Pas-de-Calais department
