= Ourton =

Ourton Orten
- Commune
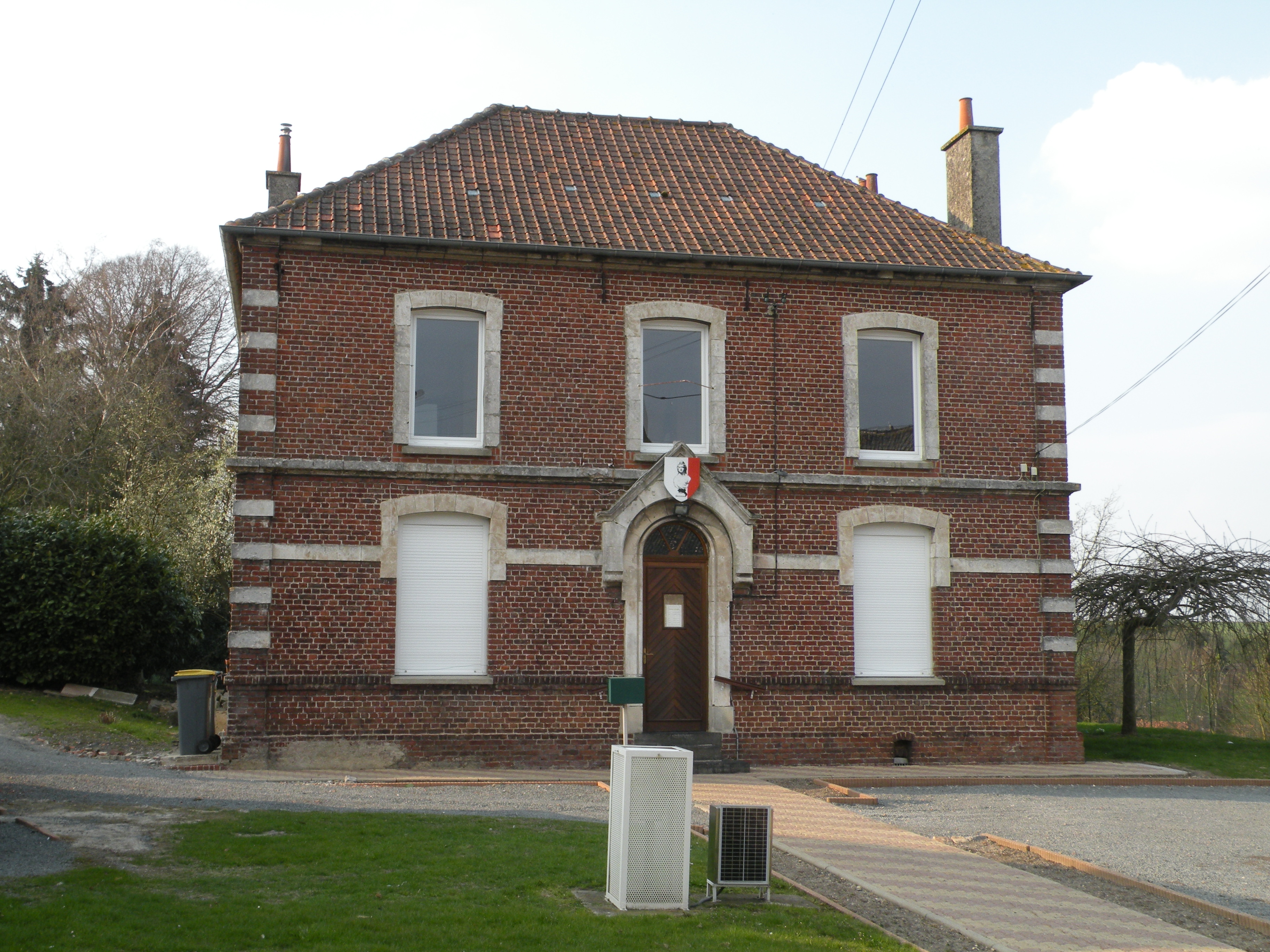
- The town hall of Ourton

- Coat of arms
- Location of Ourton
- Location within France Location within Hauts-de-France
- Coordinates: 50°27′23″N 2°28′48″E
- Country: France
- Region: Hauts-de-France
- Department: Pas-de-Calais
- Arrondissement: Béthune
- Canton: Auchel
- Intercommunality: CA Béthune-Bruay, Artois-Lys Romane

Government
  - Mayor (2020–2026): Jean-Charles Cordonnier
- Area^{1}: 5.28 km^{2} (2.04 sq mi)
- Elevation: 96 m (315 ft)
- Highest elevation: 163 m (535 ft)
- Lowest elevation: 73 m (240 ft)
- Population (2023): 719
  - Density: 136/km^{2} (353/sq mi)
- Time zone: UTC+01:00 (CET)
  - Summer (DST): UTC+02:00 (CEST)
- INSEE/Postal code: 62642 /62460
- ^{1} French Land Register data, which excludes lakes, ponds, glaciers > 1 km^{2} (0.386 sq mi or 247 acres) and river estuaries.

Ourton (French pronunciation: [uʁtɔ̃]; West Flemish: Orten) is a commune in the Pas-de-Calais department in the Hauts-de-France region of France about 6 miles (9.7 km) southwest of Béthune and 32 miles (51 km) southwest of Lille.

== Population ==
Historical population
Year	Pop.	±% p.a.
1968	732	—
1975	703	−0.58%
1982	726	+0.46%
1990	704	−0.38%
1999	700	−0.06%
2007	766	+1.13%
2012	793	+0.70%
2017	769	−0.61%
2023	719	−1.11%
Source: INSEE

== See also ==
- Communes of the Pas-de-Calais department
