= Estrée-Cauchy =

- Commune
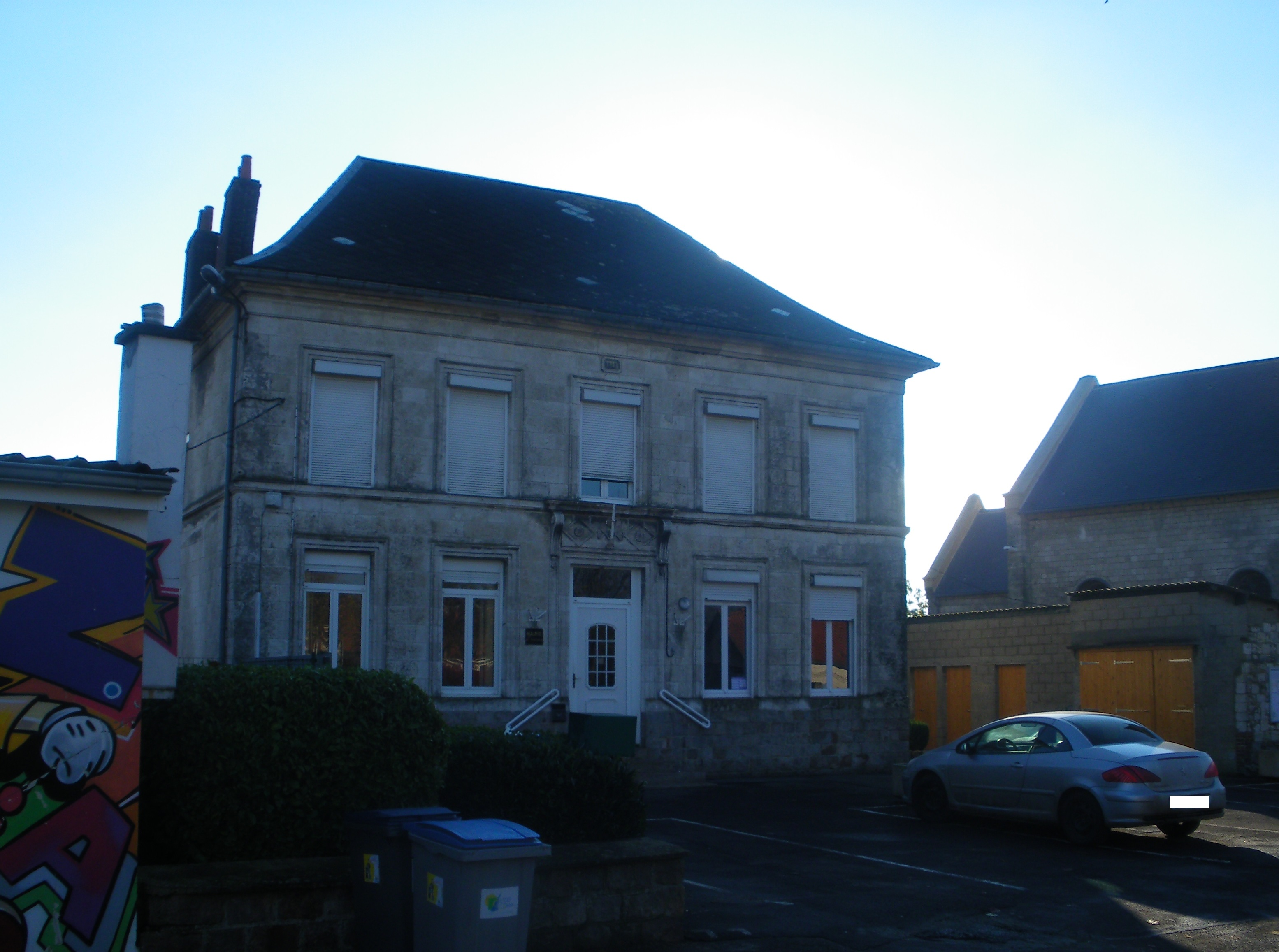
- The town hall of Estrée-Cauchy

- Coat of arms
- Location of Estrée-Cauchy
- Location within France Location within Hauts-de-France
- Coordinates: 50°23′55″N 2°36′37″E
- Country: France
- Region: Hauts-de-France
- Department: Pas-de-Calais
- Arrondissement: Béthune
- Canton: Bruay-la-Buissière
- Intercommunality: CA Béthune-Bruay, Artois-Lys Romane

Government
  - Mayor (2020–2026): Dorothée Opigez
- Area^{1}: 3.89 km^{2} (1.50 sq mi)
- Elevation: 159 m (522 ft)
- Highest elevation: 171 m (561 ft)
- Lowest elevation: 118 m (387 ft)
- Population (2023): 354
  - Density: 91.0/km^{2} (236/sq mi)
- Time zone: UTC+01:00 (CET)
  - Summer (DST): UTC+02:00 (CEST)
- INSEE/Postal code: 62314 /62690
- ^{1} French Land Register data, which excludes lakes, ponds, glaciers > 1 km^{2} (0.386 sq mi or 247 acres) and river estuaries.

Estrée-Cauchy is a commune in the Pas-de-Calais department in the Hauts-de-France region of France. about 12 miles (19 km) to the northwest of Arras and 11 miles (18 km) south of Béthune.

== Population ==
Historical population
Year	Pop.	±% p.a.
1968	276	—
1975	288	+0.61%
1982	309	+1.01%
1990	320	+0.44%
1999	321	+0.03%
2007	380	+2.13%
2012	371	−0.48%
2017	373	+0.11%
2023	354	−0.87%
Source: INSEE

== See also ==
- Communes of the Pas-de-Calais department
