= Houdain =

- Commune
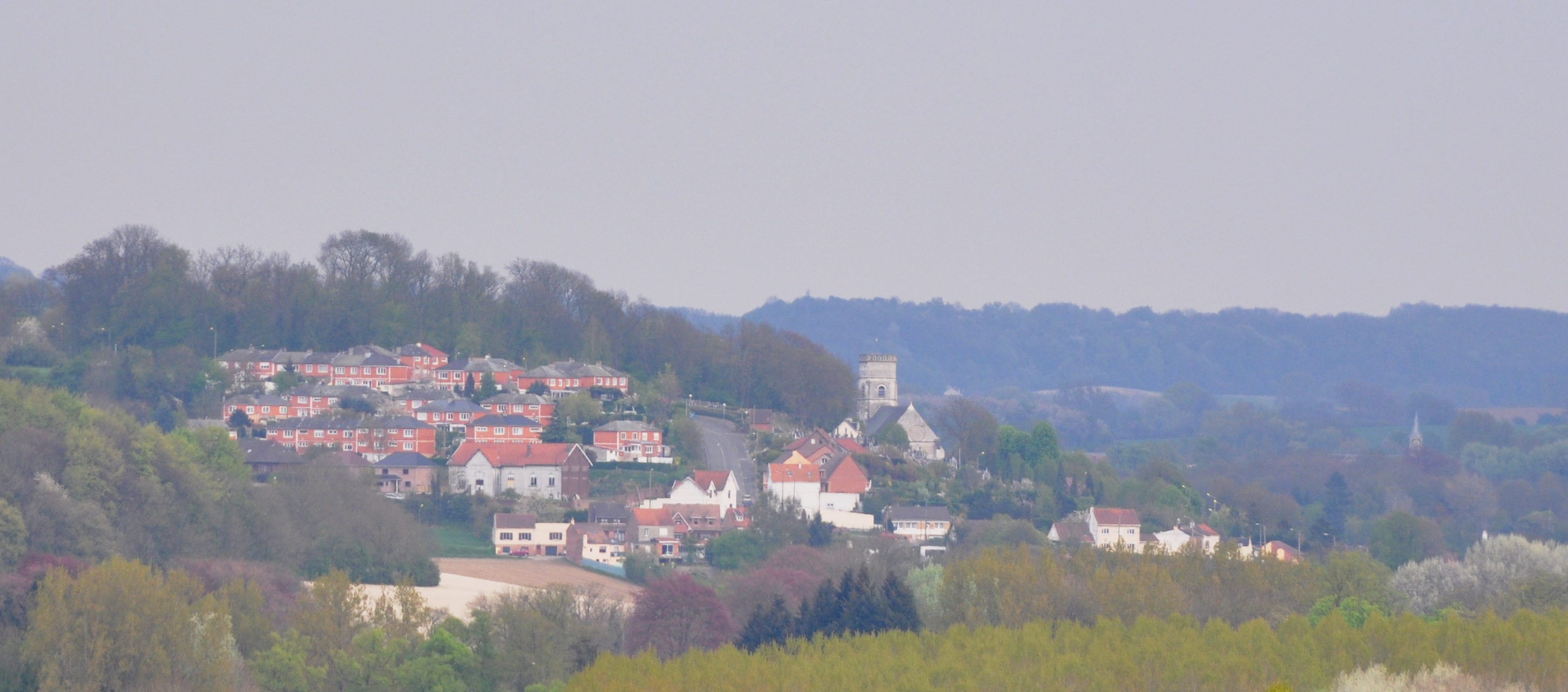
- A general view of Houdain

- Coat of arms
- Location of Houdain
- Location within France Location within Hauts-de-France
- Coordinates: 50°27′10″N 2°32′17″E
- Country: France
- Region: Hauts-de-France
- Department: Pas-de-Calais
- Arrondissement: Béthune
- Canton: Bruay-la-Buissière
- Intercommunality: CA Béthune-Bruay, Artois-Lys Romane

Government
  - Mayor (2020–2026): Isabelle Levent-Ruckebusch
- Area^{1}: 6.3 km^{2} (2.4 sq mi)
- Elevation: 53 m (174 ft)
- Highest elevation: 121 m (397 ft)
- Lowest elevation: 45 m (148 ft)
- Population (2023): 6,945
  - Density: 1,100/km^{2} (2,900/sq mi)
- Time zone: UTC+01:00 (CET)
  - Summer (DST): UTC+02:00 (CEST)
- INSEE/Postal code: 62457 /62150
- ^{1} French Land Register data, which excludes lakes, ponds, glaciers > 1 km^{2} (0.386 sq mi or 247 acres) and river estuaries.

Houdain (French pronunciation: [udɛ̃]) is a commune in the Pas-de-Calais department in the Hauts-de-France region of France about 3 miles (4.8 km) south of Béthune.

== Population ==
Historical population
Year	Pop.	±% p.a.
1968	8,807	—
1975	8,483	−0.53%
1982	7,746	−1.29%
1990	7,930	+0.29%
1999	7,771	−0.22%
2007	7,613	−0.26%
2012	7,559	−0.14%
2017	7,246	−0.84%
2023	6,945	−0.70%
Source: INSEE

== Notable people ==
- Hervé (Florimond Ronger), composer, born 1825 in Hoidain.

== See also ==
- Communes of the Pas-de-Calais department
