= Bajus, Pas-de-Calais =

Bajus
- Commune
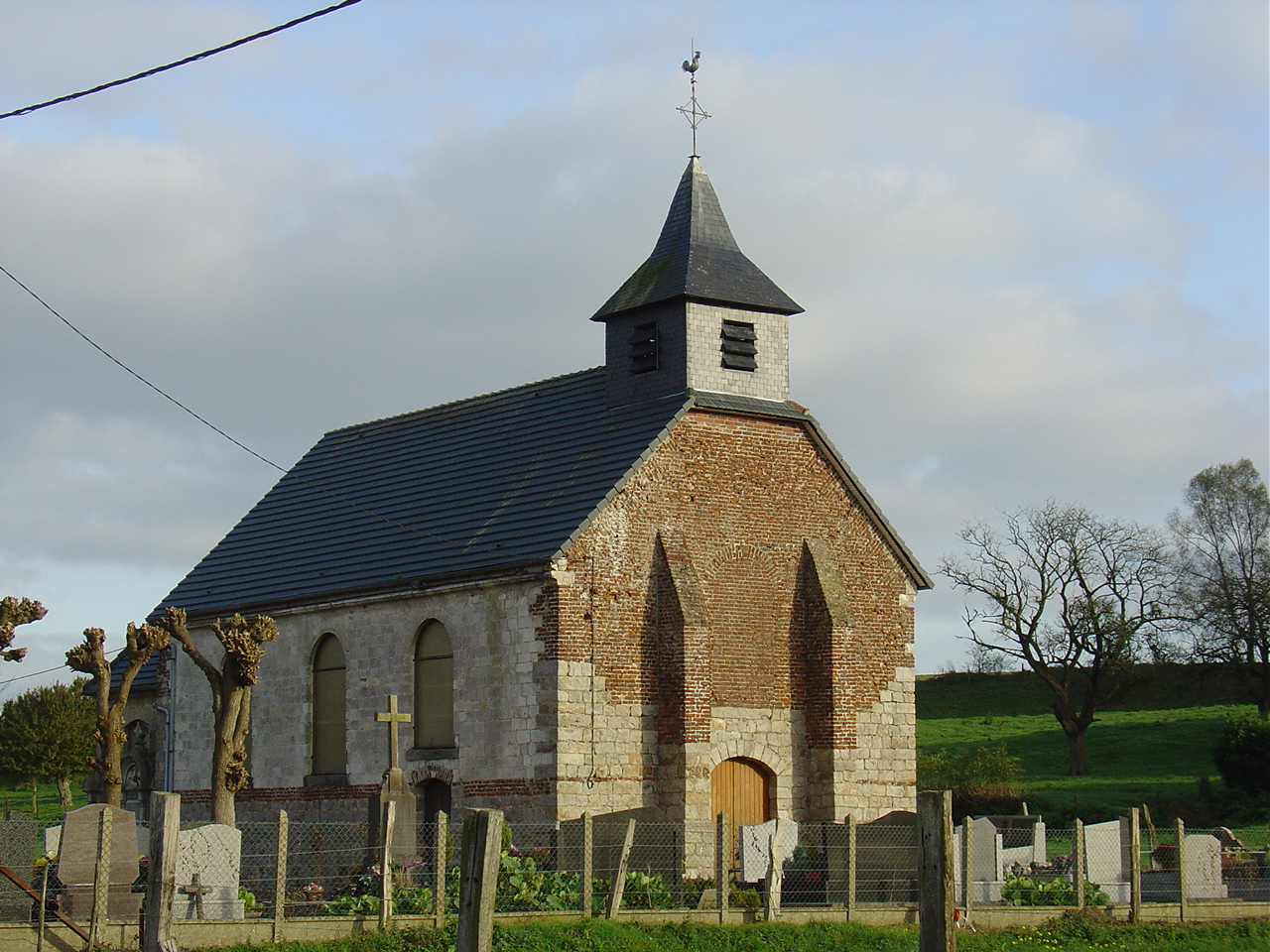
- The church of Bajus

- Coat of arms
- Location of Bajus
- Location within France Location within Hauts-de-France
- Coordinates: 50°25′19″N 2°28′51″E
- Country: France
- Region: Hauts-de-France
- Department: Pas-de-Calais
- Arrondissement: Béthune
- Canton: Bruay-la-Buissière
- Intercommunality: CA Béthune-Bruay, Artois-Lys Romane

Government
  - Mayor (2023–2026): Daniel Dericquebourg
- Area^{1}: 2.94 km^{2} (1.14 sq mi)
- Elevation: 100 m (330 ft)
- Highest elevation: 158 m (518 ft)
- Lowest elevation: 87 m (285 ft)
- Population (2023): 355
  - Density: 121/km^{2} (313/sq mi)
- Time zone: UTC+01:00 (CET)
  - Summer (DST): UTC+02:00 (CEST)
- INSEE/Postal code: 62077 /62150
- ^{1} French Land Register data, which excludes lakes, ponds, glaciers > 1 km^{2} (0.386 sq mi or 247 acres) and river estuaries.

Bajus (French pronunciation: [baʒy]; Picard: Bajeus) is a commune in the Pas-de-Calais department in the Hauts-de-France region in northern France.

== Geography ==
A farming village located 20 miles (32 km) northwest of Arras at the junction of the D86E and D86E1 roads.

== Population ==
Historical population
Year	Pop.	±% p.a.
1968	205	—
1975	202	−0.21%
1982	280	+4.78%
1990	290	+0.44%
1999	273	−0.67%
2007	296	+1.02%
2012	358	+3.88%
2017	365	+0.39%
2023	355	−0.46%
Source: INSEE

== Sights ==
- The church of St. Vaast, dating from the eighteenth century.
- The motte and moat of an old castle.
- The eighteenth-century chateau.

== See also ==
- Communes of the Pas-de-Calais department
