= Lawe =

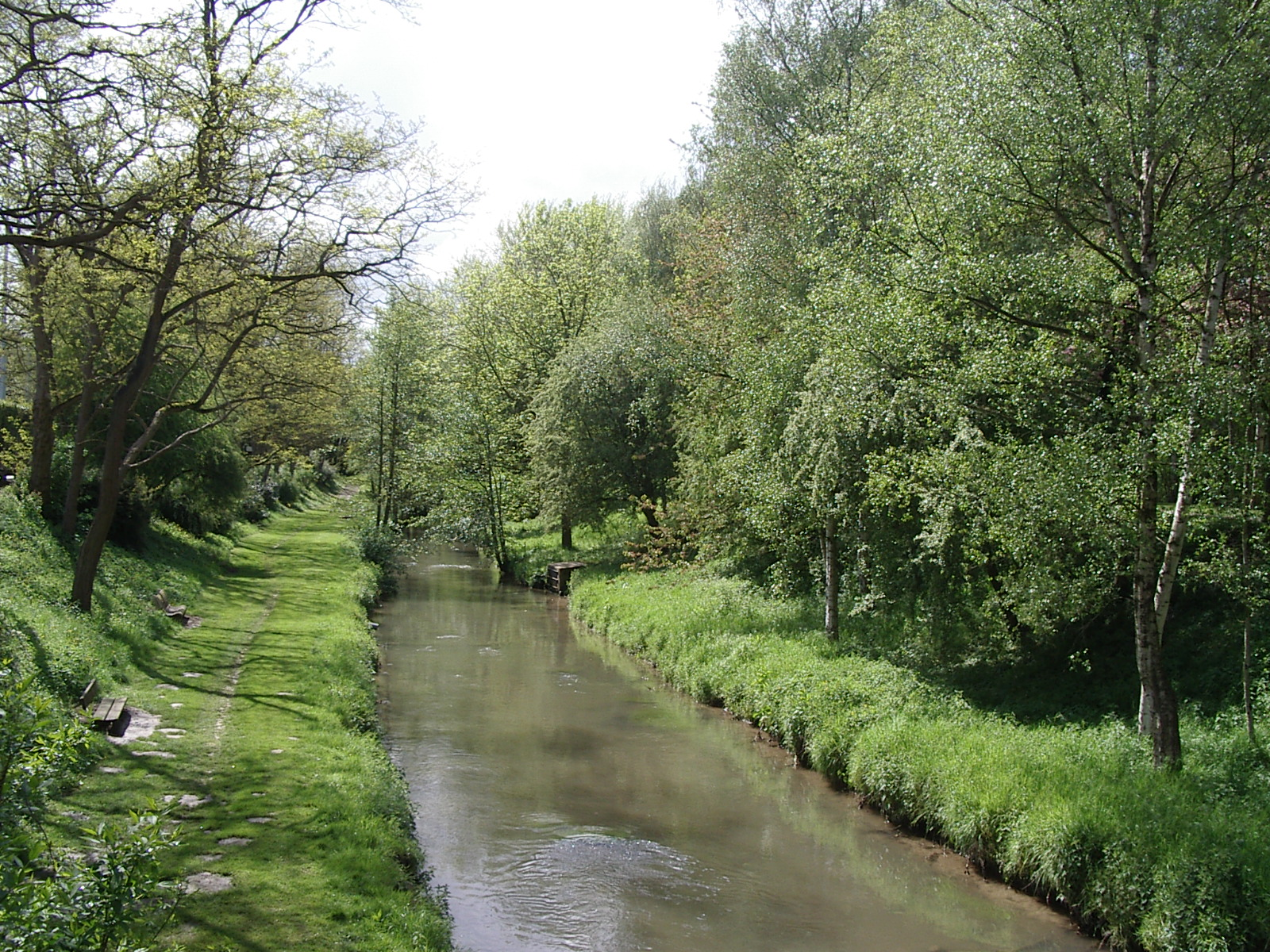
- The Lawe at Bruay-La Buissière (Pas-de-Calais, France)

- Location within France Location within Hauts-de-France

Location
- Country: France

Physical characteristics
- Source
  - location: France
- Mouth
  - location: Lys
  - coordinates: 50°38′23″N 2°42′17″E
- Length: 41 km (25 mi)

Basin features
- Progression: Lys→ Scheldt→ North Sea

The Lawe (French pronunciation: [lav]) is a river of northern France, and a right tributary of the Lys. It is 41 km (25 mi) long. Its source is near Magnicourt-en-Comte. It flows generally northeast through Houdain, Bruay-la-Buissière, Béthune and Lestrem. It flows into the Lys in La Gorgue.
