= John O'Sullivan (soldier) =

Irish soldier

Sir John William O'Sullivan
- Sir John O'Sullivan, from a portrait miniature
- Born: c. 1700; County Kerry, Ireland
- Died: c. 1760 (aged 59–60)
- Burial place: Annezin-les-Béthune
- Relatives: John L. O'Sullivan (great-grandson)
- Military career
- Allegiance: France; Jacobites
- Rank: Colonel
- Conflicts: Jacobite rising of 1745; Battle of Prestonpans; Battle of Falkirk; Battle of Culloden; War of the Austrian Succession: Battle of Lauffeld

Sir John William O'Sullivan (c. 1700 – c. 1760) was an Irish professional soldier, who spent most of his career in the service of France, but is best known for his involvement in the Jacobite rising of 1745, an attempt to regain the British throne for the exiled House of Stuart. During the Rising, he acted as adjutant general and quartermaster general of the Jacobite army and had a major influence on the campaign.

Although many secondary works give his surname as "O'Sullivan", he used the form "Sullivan" in his own correspondence.

== Early career ==
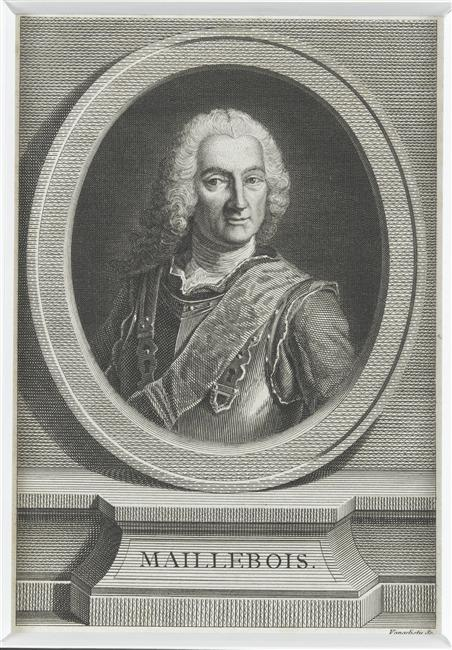
The Marquis de Maillebois; Sullivan accompanied him to Corsica in 1739

O'Sullivan was born c. 1700 at Cappanacush near Kenmare in County Kerry, one of two sons of Dermot O'Sullivan, whose family estate of Dunkerron had been confiscated under the Act for the Settlement of Ireland 1652.

Information on his early life is limited and taken from The Young Juba, an often unreliable biography of Charles Stuart written in 1748 by Aeneas MacDonald, using the pseudonym Michell.

The Penal Laws limited opportunities for the Irish Catholic gentry and like many contemporaries, O'Sullivan was educated in Paris and Rome, possibly in preparation for the priesthood. MacDonald suggests he became tutor to the son of the Marquis de Maillebois, and accompanied him in the 1739 French and Genoese reconquest of Corsica. He is recorded as serving in Italy and on the Rhine during the War of the Austrian Succession, although few details are provided.

== 1745 rebellion ==
Action between HMS Lion and Elizabeth, 9 July 1745

Following the abandonment of a French invasion attempt in early 1744, the Stuart heir Charles began planning a small-scale landing in Scotland to take place the following year. He started purchasing weapons in early 1745 while the French provided limited logistical support, much of it brokered by Lord Clare; O'Sullivan joined Charles's household in March.

Charles's former tutor Sheridan claimed to have first recommended him, though he is also suggested to have been recruited directly by Clare. A contemporary account said that "no one who knows Mr. Sullivan can deny his being one of the best bred, genteelist, complaisant, engaging officers in all the French troops". Charles enjoyed O'Sullivan's company and trusted his advice: in return, O’Sullivan was to be unerringly loyal to him. From this point he was closely involved in planning the 1745 expedition and as one of the "Seven Men of Moidart" accompanied Charles during his landing on Eriskay.

The campaign got off to a poor start when the ship Elizabeth, carrying weapons and a force of Franco-Irish regulars, had to turn back after being intercepted and damaged by HMS Lion. On arrival, nearly every single contact urged Charles to return to France; he persuaded enough to support him but was dependent on a small force mobilised by Donald Cameron of Lochiel and other Lochaber chiefs. O'Sullivan recalled Lochiel had "700 good men, but ill armed; Kapock arrived the same day, w[i]th about 350 clivor fellows". Cavalryman Sir John MacDonald, another of the 'Seven Men', later wrote that Lochiel admitted to lacking military experience; he therefore suggested that although either he or Francis Strickland could do the job of organising the Jacobite forces, O'Sullivan was the best qualified. O'Sullivan was accordingly installed as adjutant-general and quartermaster-general, handling personnel, training and logistics.

As more recruits came in, O'Sullivan organised them as a relatively conventional eighteenth-century army with a staff, cavalry, infantry, artillery, and supporting elements. Command of the field army originally rotated between Lord George Murray and the Duke of Perth, but at Falkirk and Culloden, O'Sullivan was in overall control. The two Scots acted as brigade commanders, with the addition of Perth's brother John Drummond after his arrival in late November.

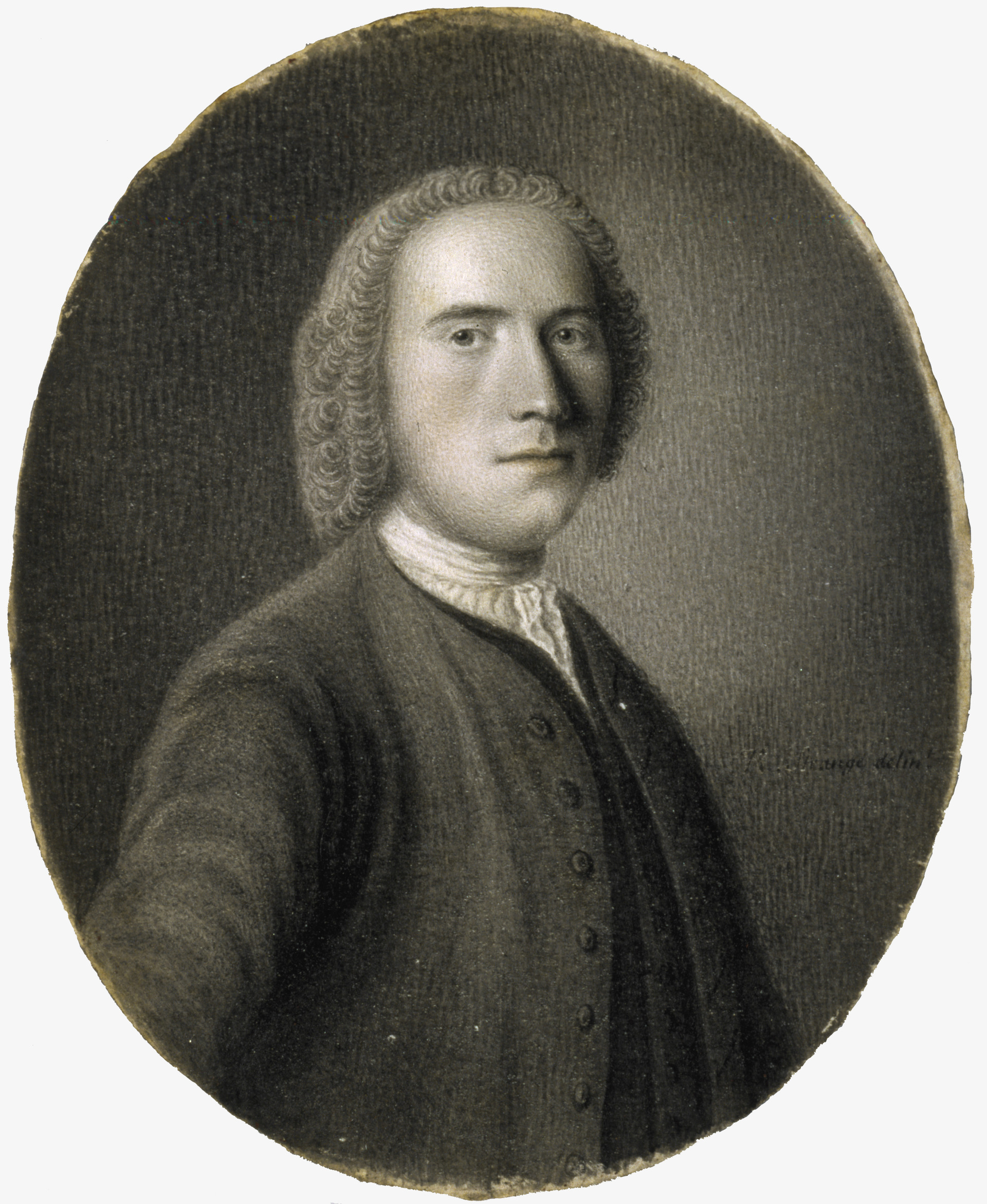
Lord George Murray; his poor relationship with Prince Charles badly affected his ability to work with O'Sullivan

Arguments over strategy after Prestonpans reflected deep divisions between the Scots and Charles' advisors, many of whom were Irish. They wanted the autonomous, Catholic Ireland promised by James II in 1689, which meant putting Charles on the British throne. The Scots who provided the bulk of the army were mostly Protestants who wanted to end the 1707 Union with England. They preferred to consolidate their position and resented the exiles, many of whom held French commissions and would be treated as prisoners of war if the Rising failed; the Scots risked execution and loss of their lands.

There were several disagreements on strategy in the Jacobite Council of War between its Scots and Irish members, particularly regarding the invasion of England. O'Sullivan supported the invasion in the face of the reservations of many Scots, despite his own concerns that their force was not large enough.

O'Sullivan and Murray in particular appear to have clashed during the campaign. While French-trained exiles like O'Sullivan considered Murray's knowledge outdated, Murray had a low opinion of O'Sullivan's abilities and later said that he wished that "Mr O'Sullivan had never got any other charge in the army than the care of the baggage". Nineteenth-century historians tended to interpret these differences in outlook by condemning O'Sullivan for incompetence, although in reality his administration appears to have been effective. O'Sullivan was primarily responsible for the organisation of the army's march southwards to England, which despite the army being formed in three separate columns was tightly coordinated and which has been assessed as "staff work of the highest order".

== Battle of Culloden ==
O'Sullivan's part in the Battle of Culloden is controversial, as many nineteenth century writers, and some later ones such as John Prebble, laid much of the blame on him for the Jacobite defeat. The influence of this is particularly noticeable in Peter Watkins' 1964 Culloden, based on Prebble's work, which in the course of framing the Jacobites as a largely feudal, archaic army led by incompetent aristocrats, depicts O'Sullivan as a "complete fool".

Although the most common criticism is of his choice of battlefield, O'Sullivan originally selected a site east of the final battle line; alternative choices had their own problems and in the event circumstances largely dictated the site in which the army actually drew up. There were few other viable options left than standing and fighting at Culloden and most of the Jacobite commanders were ultimately in favour of giving battle. Contrary to the accounts of Prebble and others, archaeological studies have shown that the Jacobite artillery at Culloden was not supplied with ammunition of the wrong size.

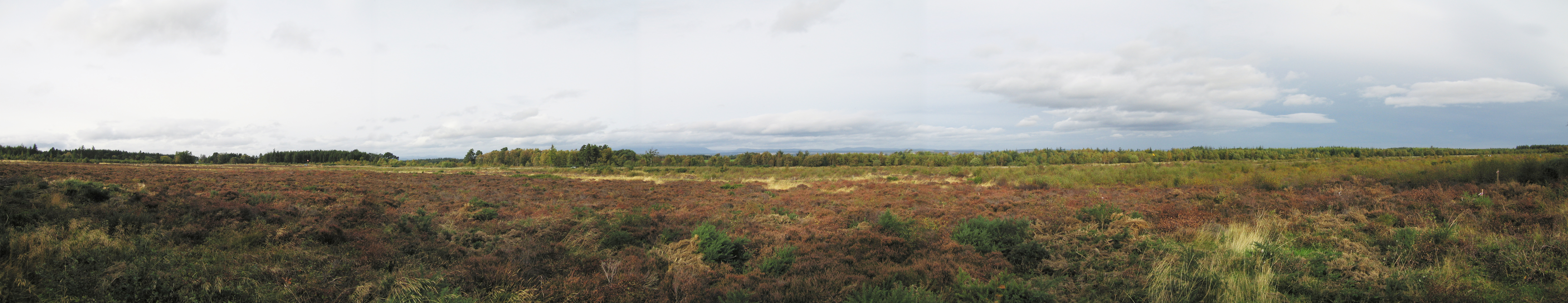
Panorama of the battlefield, circa 2007. The flag on the left side indicates the Jacobite lines, the flag on the right side shows the location of the Government lines.

O'Sullivan's memoirs depicted him and John Drummond attempting to rally the Jacobite left and second line to ensure an orderly withdrawal. A witness records Charles wanted to lead a charge in an attempt to retrieve the situation but O'Sullivan ordered his escort to lead him away from the field. He later wrote that he "continued his retraite, making volte face from time to time alternatively with the small number of horse he had & those five and twenty men of Berwick’s". Evacuated by a French ship in May, on returning to France he urged an expedition be mounted to rescue Charles.

== Post-Culloden ==
Despite the defeat at Culloden, O'Sullivan remained well regarded by the Stuart family. O'Sullivan was knighted by James Stuart in 1746 and received an Irish knighthood and baronetcy in the Jacobite peerage in 1753. He later fell out with Prince Charles, allegedly after an affair with his long-time mistress Clementina Walkinshaw.

O'Sullivan's reputation in France does not seem to have been impacted by the Jacobite defeat; he was included on a 'gratification list' drawn up by the French in October 1746 and offered the choice of a colonelcy in one of Clare's, Bulkeley's or Dillon's regiments. He subsequently again served as a staff officer with the French Army and is known to have been at Lauffeld in 1747, where Cumberland was defeated by Saxe, as well as with the force assembled for the 1759 planned French invasion of Britain.

Further information regarding O'Sullivan is sparse. However he married Louise Fitzgerald in 1749 with whom he had a son, Thomas O'Sullivan, who went on to become a Major in the Irish Brigade; Thomas later emigrated to North America and served in the British Army. His descendants included the American journalist John L. O'Sullivan; Margaret Thatcher also believed herself to be descended from O'Sullivan on her father's side.

The last reference to O'Sullivan is dated 20 December 1760 and he is presumed to have died soon after. He is buried in the church of Annezin-les-Béthune, in Northern France.

== Sources ==
- Bergin, John; O'Sullivan (Sullivan), Sir John William" in Dictionary of Irish Biography. (ed.) James McGuire, James Quinn. Cambridge, United Kingdom: Cambridge University Press, 2009.
- Hayden, Mary (1934). "Prince Charles Edward and His Irish Friends". Studies: An Irish Quarterly Review. 23 (89).
- Michell, M (1748). Young Juba: The History of the Young Chevalier, From His Birth, To His Escape From Scotland, After the Battle of Culloden (2010 ed.). Gale Ecco. ISBN 978-1-140-94372-3.
- Pollard, Tony; Culloden: The History and Archaeology of the Last Clan Battle Pen and Sword, Kindle Edition;
- Reid, Stuart; 1745: A Military History of the Last Jacobite Rising, Spellmount, 1996
- Riding, Jacqueline (2016). Jacobites: A New History of the 45 Rebellion. Bloomsbury. ISBN 978-1-4088-1912-8.
- Stephen, Jeffrey (January 2010). "Scottish Nationalism and Stuart Unionism". Journal of British Studies. 49 (1, Scottish Special). doi:10.1086/644534.
- Zimmerman, Doron (2004). The Jacobite Movement in Scotland and in Exile, 1749-1759. Palgrave Macmillan. ISBN 978-1-4039-1291-6.
