= Oblinghem =

- Commune
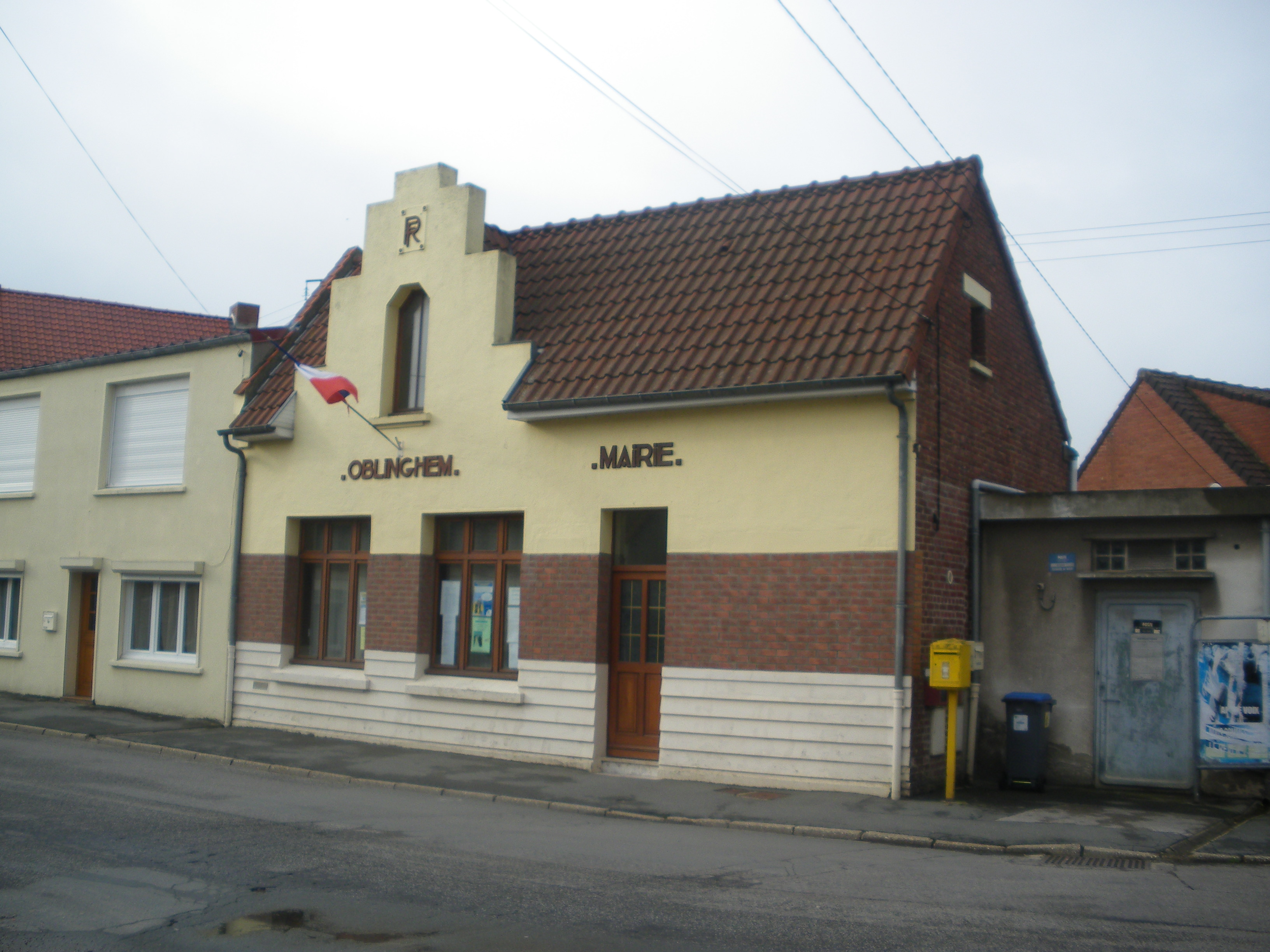
- The town hall of Oblinghem

- Coat of arms
- Location of Oblinghem
- Location within France Location within Hauts-de-France
- Coordinates: 50°32′59″N 2°35′58″E
- Country: France
- Region: Hauts-de-France
- Department: Pas-de-Calais
- Arrondissement: Béthune
- Canton: Béthune
- Intercommunality: CA Béthune-Bruay, Artois-Lys Romane

Government
  - Mayor (2020–2026): Christophe Desquiret
- Area^{1}: 1.27 km^{2} (0.49 sq mi)
- Elevation: 21 m (69 ft)
- Highest elevation: 25 m (82 ft)
- Lowest elevation: 19 m (62 ft)
- Population (2023): 384
  - Density: 302/km^{2} (783/sq mi)
- Time zone: UTC+01:00 (CET)
  - Summer (DST): UTC+02:00 (CEST)
- INSEE/Postal code: 62632 /62920
- ^{1} French Land Register data, which excludes lakes, ponds, glaciers > 1 km^{2} (0.386 sq mi or 247 acres) and river estuaries.

Oblinghem (French pronunciation: [ɔblɛ̃ɡɛm]; Picard: Oblinghin) is a commune in the Pas-de-Calais department in the Hauts-de-France region of France.

== Geography ==
Oblinghem is situated about 2 miles (3.2 km) northwest of Béthune and 24 miles (39 km) southwest of Lille, on the D180 road.

== Population ==
Historical population
Year	Pop.	±% p.a.
1968	232	—
1975	230	−0.12%
1982	221	−0.57%
1990	223	+0.11%
1999	225	+0.10%
2007	205	−1.16%
2012	221	+1.51%
2017	379	+11.39%
2023	384	+0.22%
Source: INSEE

== See also ==
- Communes of the Pas-de-Calais department
