= Vendin-lès-Béthune =

Vendin-lès-Béthune Wenden
- Commune
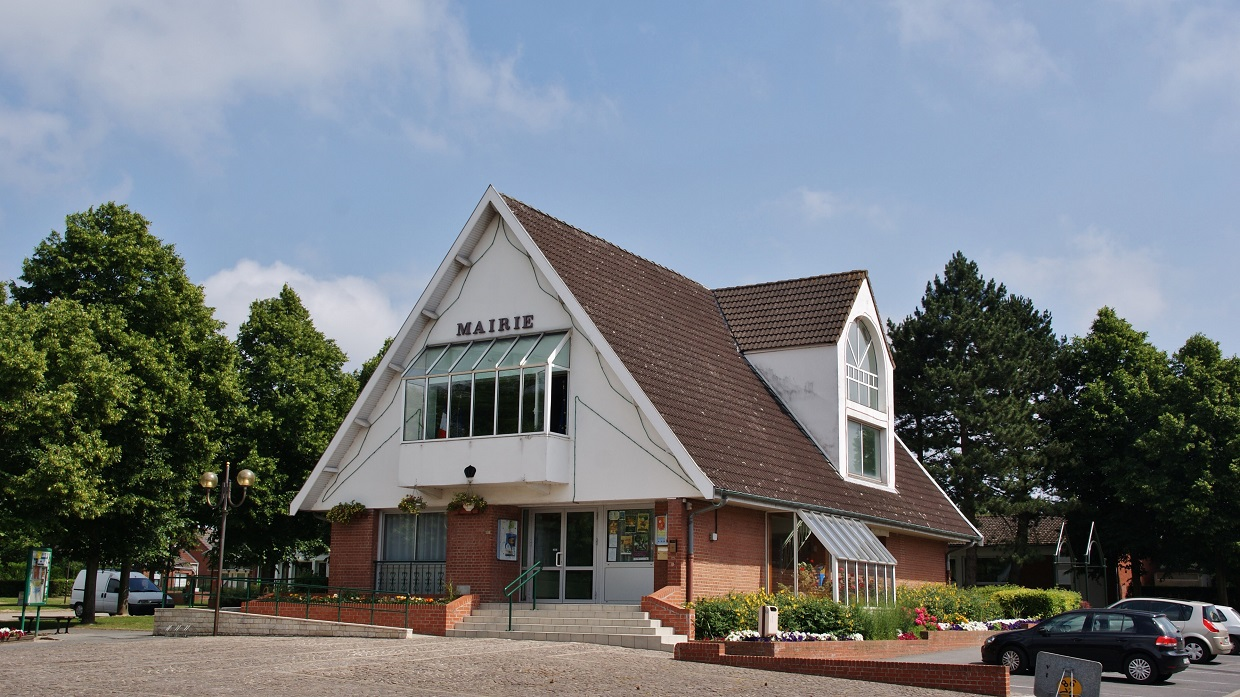
- The town hall of Vendin-lès-Béthune

- Coat of arms
- Location of Vendin-lès-Béthune
- Location within France Location within Hauts-de-France
- Coordinates: 50°32′34″N 2°36′26″E
- Country: France
- Region: Hauts-de-France
- Department: Pas-de-Calais
- Arrondissement: Béthune
- Canton: Béthune
- Intercommunality: CA Béthune-Bruay, Artois-Lys Romane

Government
  - Mayor (2020–2026): Sylvie Meyfroidt Lefait
- Area^{1}: 3.63 km^{2} (1.40 sq mi)
- Elevation: 27 m (89 ft)
- Highest elevation: 45 m (148 ft)
- Lowest elevation: 21 m (69 ft)
- Population (2023): 2,374
  - Density: 654/km^{2} (1,690/sq mi)
- Time zone: UTC+01:00 (CET)
  - Summer (DST): UTC+02:00 (CEST)
- INSEE/Postal code: 62841 /62232
- ^{1} French Land Register data, which excludes lakes, ponds, glaciers > 1 km^{2} (0.386 sq mi or 247 acres) and river estuaries.

Vendin-lès-Béthune (French pronunciation: [vɑ̃dɛ̃ lɛ betyn], literally Vendin near Béthune; Picard: Vindin-lès-Betheune; West Flemish: Wenden) is a commune in the Pas-de-Calais department in the Hauts-de-France region of France.

== Geography ==
An ex-coalmining area, Vendin-lès-Béthune is situated 2 miles (3.2 km) northwest of Béthune and 24 miles (39 km) southwest of Lille, at the junction of the D180 and D181e roads.

== Population ==
Historical population
Year	Pop.	±% p.a.
1968	2,040	—
1975	2,533	+3.14%
1982	2,302	−1.36%
1990	2,450	+0.78%
1999	2,526	+0.34%
2007	2,416	−0.56%
2012	2,401	−0.12%
2017	2,443	+0.35%
2023	2,374	−0.48%
Source: INSEE

== Places of interest ==
- The church of St.Vaast, dating from the nineteenth century.
- The war memorial.
- The Harlem Shake place
- The Guelton memorial

== See also ==
- Communes of the Pas-de-Calais department
