= Atholl raids =

Military actions in 1746

- Part of the Jacobite rising of 1745
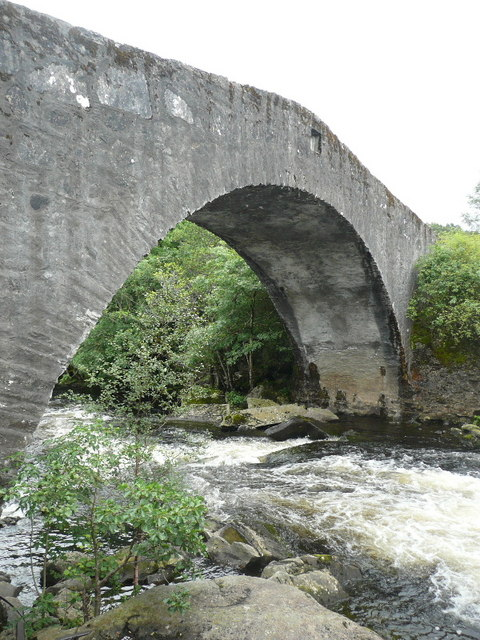
- Tummel Bridge, which was built for General Wade in 1730 and which was captured by the Jacobites during the Atholl raids in 1746
Date	14 – 17 March, 1746
Location	Atholl, Scotland
Result	Jacobite victory

Belligerents
(Kingdom of Great Britain) Great Britain; Campbell of Argyll Militia; Loudon's Highlanders	Jacobites; Atholl Brigade (Clan Murray); Clan Macpherson

Commanders and leaders
(Kingdom of Great Britain) Colin Campbell of Glenure	Lord George Murray

Strength
	700 Highlanders; Atholl Brigade: 400; Macphersons: 300

Casualties and losses
2 killed 8 or 10 wounded 300 taken prisoner	Unknown

The Atholl raids of 14 - 17 March 1746 were a series of raids carried out by Jacobite rebels against the British-Hanoverian Government during the Jacobite rising of 1745.

== Background ==
The commander of British forces in Scotland, Prince William, Duke of Cumberland, was confident that there was no chance of friendly forces being surprised, even though a man who had recently escaped from Jacobite captivity reported that the Jacobites were planning on attacking the outposts held by the Campbells that were covering Blair Atholl and Castle Menzies. The Jacobite commander, Lord George Murray, collected his Atholl Brigade along with two 4-pounder cannons and marched from Inverness to Strathspey, taking the surrender of Castle Grant on 14 March. Murray left the castle garrisoned by 100 men and in Ruthven, Badenoch he was joined by Archibald Menzies of Struan and Ewen MacPherson of Cluny with 300 Macphersons, bringing his total force to 700 men.

== Raids ==
The Jacobite troops were divided into thirty companies or detachments, consisting of both Atholl men and MacPhersons and were each assigned a particular target. The Jacobite force strode across 30 miles of hills to come within reach of their objectives, taking the Pass of Killiecrankie. The post at Bun Rannoch was then taken, which was being held by the Loudon's 64th Highlanders and much to the embarrassment of that unit's commander, Colin Campbell of Glenure, as he was not present when the Jacobite attack went in. He claimed that at the time he was at Castle Menzies, trying to obtain food for his men. His militiamen at Bun Rannoch had been drinking when they were surrounded at 11pm on 16 March by the Jacobites. The first sentry fired his musket but to no effect and was surrounded. The next post to the east was Kynachan House which guarded an important bridge over the River Tummel, but again the sentry was surrounded and this time killed. The Campbell men inside the house did for some time stand, firing out of slits in the building, but an opening was made in the roof above them and so they were obliged to surrender. At these two posts, the garrison lost two men killed, including one officer, and eight or ten wounded. In all, a dozen militia outposts had been taken by the Jacobites, and 300 government troops were taken prisoner.

== Aftermath ==
All of the objectives had been taken including those of the regular soldiers who were closest to Blair Castle. All of the government schemes to reinforce the outposts came to nothing and the Jacobite general, Lord George Murray, was then able to lay siege to Blair Castle for two weeks. The Atholl raids proved Murray's contention that guerrilla warfare tactics were the best option, but left the Jacobite army spread out over the Scottish Highlands with few troops to prevent the Duke of Cumberland marching on Inverness. Colin Campbell of Glenure whose men were defeated at the raid on Bun Rannoch was later murdered in what is now known as the Appin Murder on 14 May 1752.

== Bagpipers ==
According to historian John Buchan, the Jacobites had as many as twenty bagpipers with them when they carried out the Atholl raids.

== See also ==
- Jacobite risings
- Battle of Culloden
