= Chocques =

- Commune
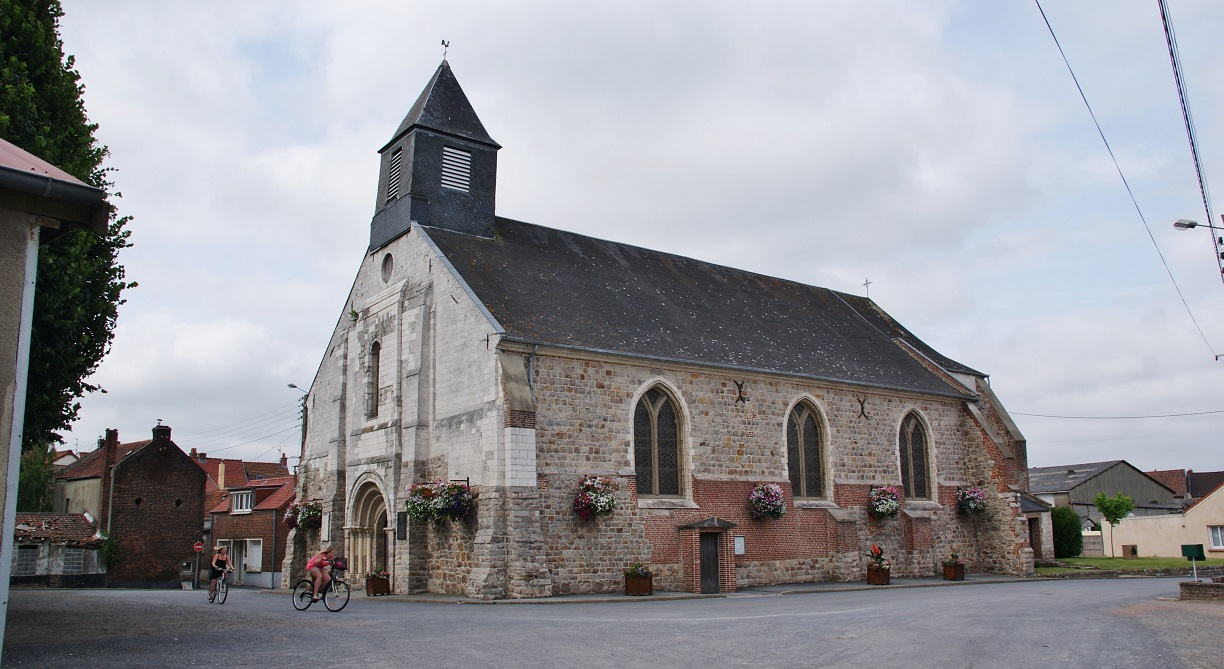
- The church of Chocques

- Coat of arms
- Location of Chocques
- Location within France Location within Hauts-de-France
- Coordinates: 50°32′33″N 2°34′26″E
- Country: France
- Region: Hauts-de-France
- Department: Pas-de-Calais
- Arrondissement: Béthune
- Canton: Béthune
- Intercommunality: CA Béthune-Bruay, Artois-Lys Romane

Government
  - Mayor (2020–2026): Yvon Massart
- Area^{1}: 7.95 km^{2} (3.07 sq mi)
- Elevation: 27 m (89 ft)
- Highest elevation: 70 m (230 ft)
- Lowest elevation: 18 m (59 ft)
- Population (2023): 2,785
  - Density: 350/km^{2} (907/sq mi)
- Time zone: UTC+01:00 (CET)
  - Summer (DST): UTC+02:00 (CEST)
- INSEE/Postal code: 62224 /62920
- ^{1} French Land Register data, which excludes lakes, ponds, glaciers > 1 km^{2} (0.386 sq mi or 247 acres) and river estuaries.

Chocques (French pronunciation: [ʃɔk]) is a commune in the Pas-de-Calais department in the Hauts-de-France region of France by the banks of the river Clarence, about 3 miles (4.8 km) west of Béthune and 30 miles (48 km) southwest of Lille.

== Population ==
Historical population
| Year | Pop. | ±% p.a. |
|---|---|---|
| 1968 | 3,736 | — |
| 1975 | 3,447 | −1.14% |
| 1982 | 3,221 | −0.96% |
| 1990 | 2,990 | −0.93% |
| 1999 | 2,918 | −0.27% |
| 2007 | 2,969 | +0.22% |
| 2012 | 2,976 | +0.05% |
| 2017 | 2,881 | −0.65% |
| 2023 | 2,785 | −0.56% |
Source: INSEE

== See also ==
- Communes of the Pas-de-Calais department
