= Lapugnoy =

- Commune
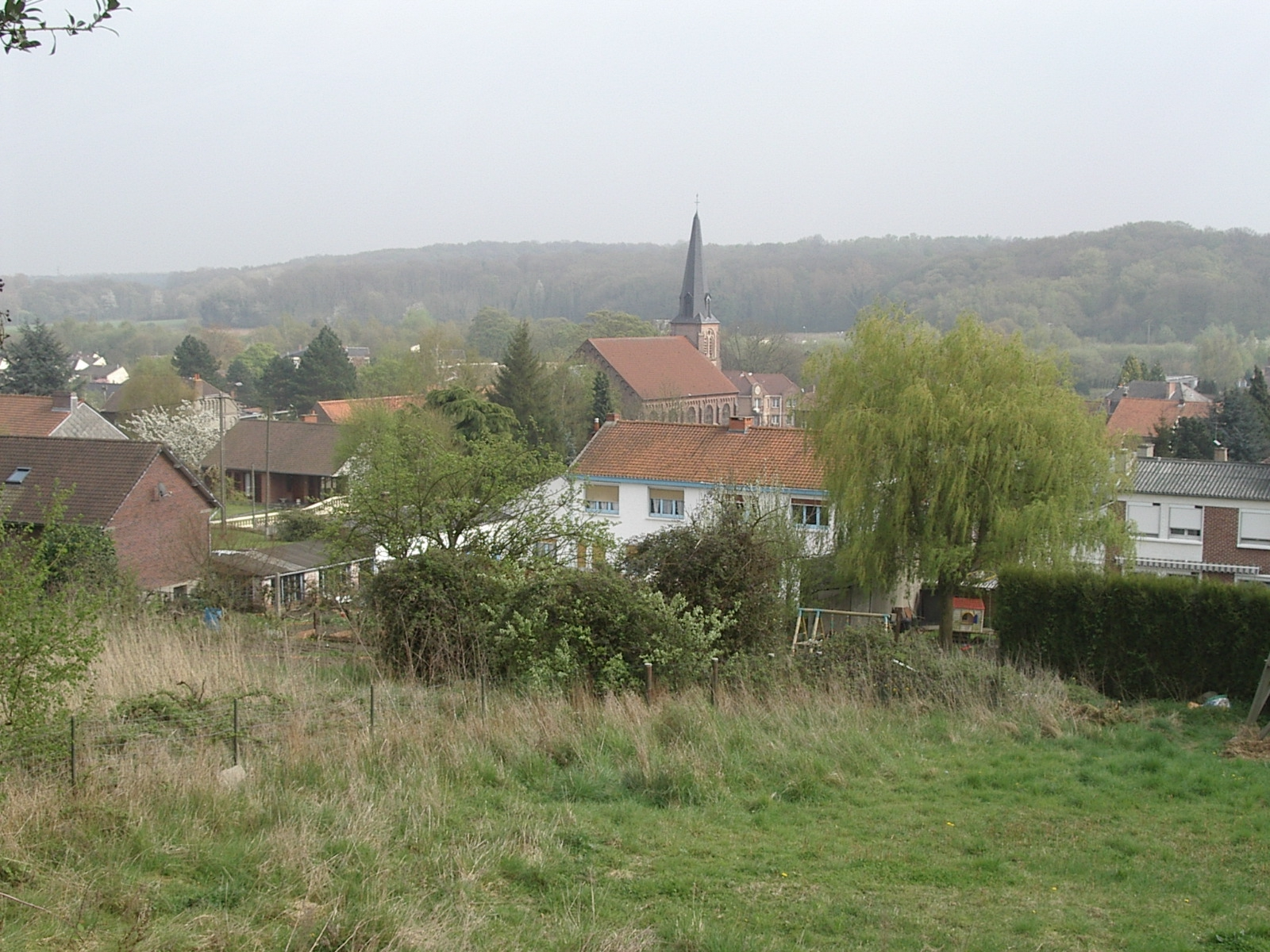
- A general view of Lapugnoy

- Coat of arms
- Location of Lapugnoy
- Location within France Location within Hauts-de-France
- Coordinates: 50°31′02″N 2°32′28″E
- Country: France
- Region: Hauts-de-France
- Department: Pas-de-Calais
- Arrondissement: Béthune
- Canton: Béthune
- Intercommunality: CA Béthune-Bruay, Artois-Lys Romane

Government
  - Mayor (2020–2026): Alain Delannoy
- Area^{1}: 8.61 km^{2} (3.32 sq mi)
- Elevation: 37 m (121 ft)
- Highest elevation: 93 m (305 ft)
- Lowest elevation: 24 m (79 ft)
- Population (2023): 3,481
  - Density: 404/km^{2} (1,050/sq mi)
- Time zone: UTC+01:00 (CET)
  - Summer (DST): UTC+02:00 (CEST)
- INSEE/Postal code: 62489 /62122
- ^{1} French Land Register data, which excludes lakes, ponds, glaciers > 1 km^{2} (0.386 sq mi or 247 acres) and river estuaries.

Lapugnoy (French pronunciation: [lapyɲwa]) is a commune in the Pas-de-Calais department in the Hauts-de-France region of France.

== Geography ==
A small farming and forestry town, situated some 5 miles (8.0 km) west of Béthune and 33 miles (53 km) southwest of Lille, on the D70 road, by the banks of the Clarence and traversed by the A26 autoroute.

== Population ==
Historical population
Year	Pop.	±% p.a.
1968	2,645	—
1975	3,259	+3.03%
1982	3,375	+0.50%
1990	3,426	+0.19%
1999	3,310	−0.38%
2007	3,289	−0.08%
2012	3,379	+0.54%
2017	3,459	+0.47%
2023	3,481	+0.11%
Source: INSEE

== Places of interest ==
- The Commonwealth War Graves Commission cemetery.
- The church of St. Vaast, dating from the nineteenth century.

== See also ==
- Communes of the Pas-de-Calais department
