= Labeuvrière =

- Commune
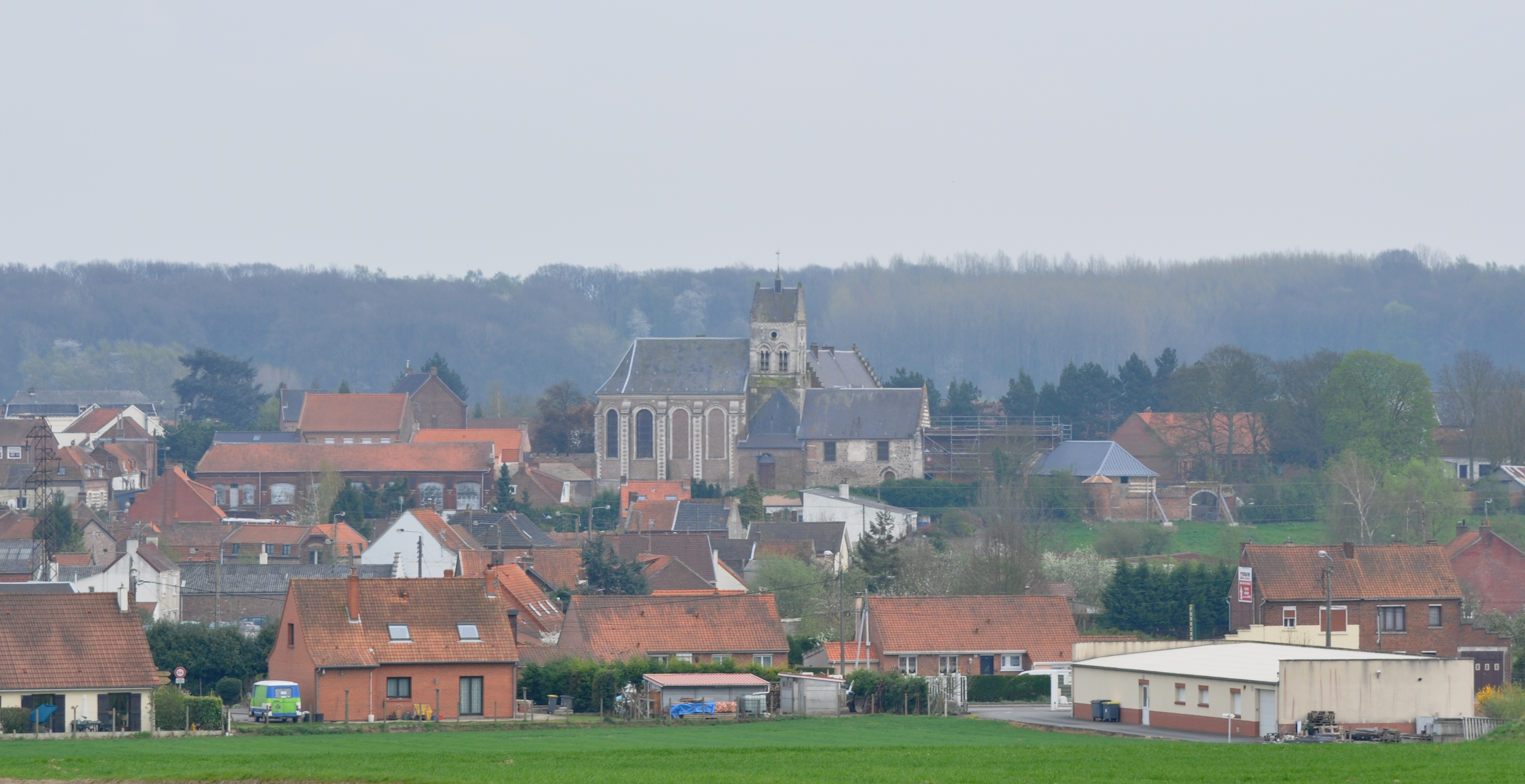
- A general view of Labeuvrière

- Coat of arms
- Location of Labeuvrière
- Location within France Location within Hauts-de-France
- Coordinates: 50°31′15″N 2°33′50″E
- Country: France
- Region: Hauts-de-France
- Department: Pas-de-Calais
- Arrondissement: Béthune
- Canton: Béthune
- Intercommunality: CA Béthune-Bruay, Artois-Lys Romane

Government
  - Mayor (2020–2026): Jacky Bertier
- Area^{1}: 6.11 km^{2} (2.36 sq mi)
- Elevation: 36 m (118 ft)
- Highest elevation: 75 m (246 ft)
- Lowest elevation: 23 m (75 ft)
- Population (2023): 1,648
  - Density: 270/km^{2} (699/sq mi)
- Time zone: UTC+01:00 (CET)
  - Summer (DST): UTC+02:00 (CEST)
- INSEE/Postal code: 62479 /62122
- ^{1} French Land Register data, which excludes lakes, ponds, glaciers > 1 km^{2} (0.386 sq mi or 247 acres) and river estuaries.

Labeuvrière (French pronunciation: [labœvʁijɛʁ]) is a commune in the Pas-de-Calais department in the Hauts-de-France region of France.

== Geography ==
A large farming and light industrial village, situated some 4 miles (6.4 km) west of Béthune and 20 miles (32 km) southwest of Lille on the D181e5, traversed by the A26 autoroute.

== Population ==
Historical population
Year	Pop.	±% p.a.
1968	1,953	—
1975	1,702	−1.95%
1982	1,714	+0.10%
1990	1,702	−0.09%
1999	1,710	+0.05%
2007	1,643	−0.50%
2012	1,695	+0.63%
2017	1,645	−0.60%
2023	1,648	+0.03%
Source: INSEE

== Places of interest ==
- The church of St. Christine, rebuilt, along with the rest of the village, after World War I.
- The ancient priory (fr: prévoté) of the abbey of St.Vaast, now the mairie.

== See also ==
- Communes of the Pas-de-Calais department
