= Annezin =

- Commune
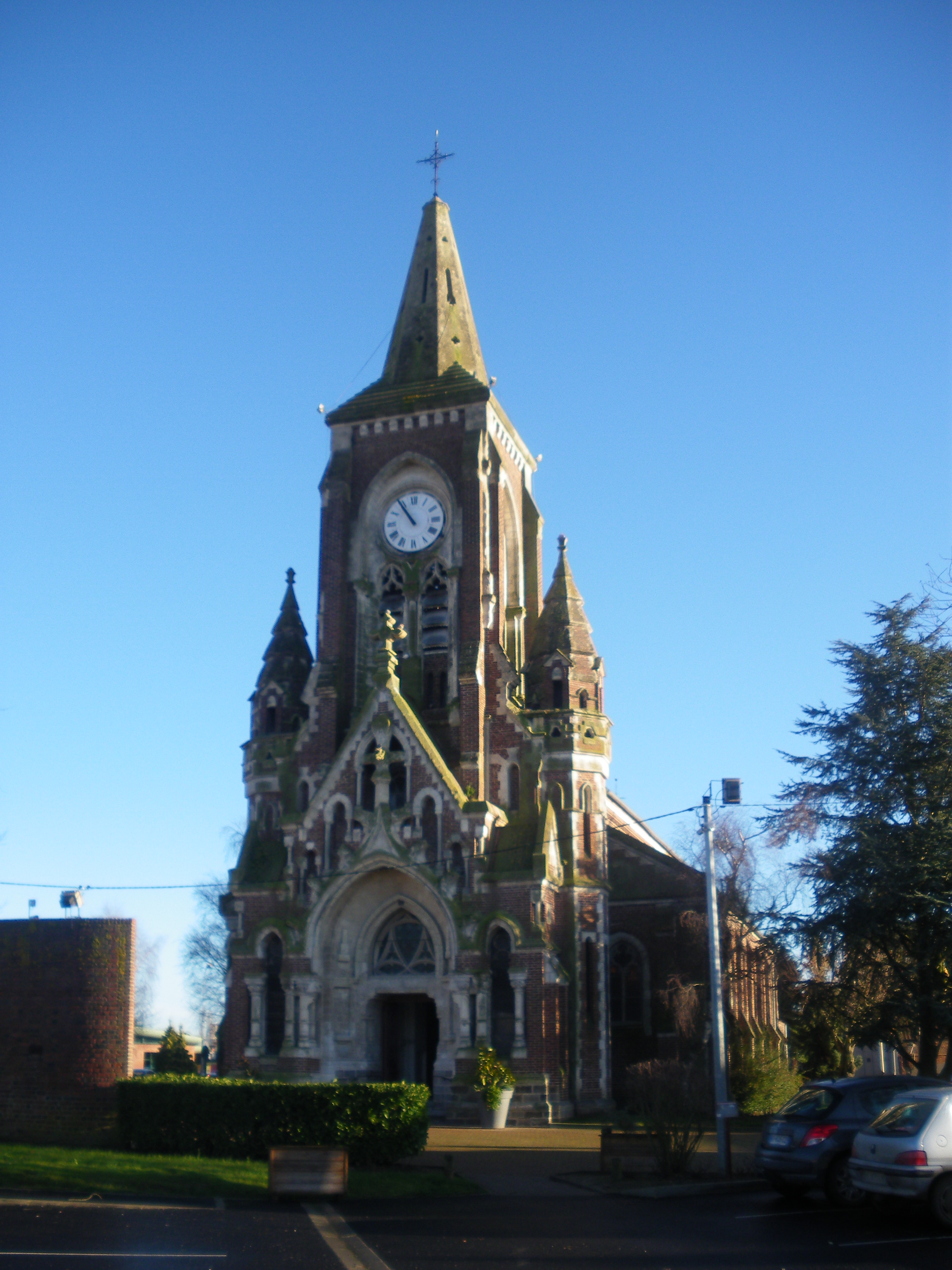
- The church of Annezin

- Coat of arms
- Location of Annezin
- Location within France Location within Hauts-de-France
- Coordinates: 50°32′03″N 2°37′08″E
- Country: France
- Region: Hauts-de-France
- Department: Pas-de-Calais
- Arrondissement: Béthune
- Canton: Béthune
- Intercommunality: CA Béthune-Bruay, Artois-Lys Romane

Government
  - Mayor (2020–2026): Grégory Debas
- Area^{1}: 6.1 km^{2} (2.4 sq mi)
- Elevation: 24 m (79 ft)
- Highest elevation: 53 m (174 ft)
- Lowest elevation: 18 m (59 ft)
- Population (2023): 5,825
  - Density: 950/km^{2} (2,500/sq mi)
- Time zone: UTC+01:00 (CET)
  - Summer (DST): UTC+02:00 (CEST)
- INSEE/Postal code: 62035 /62232
- ^{1} French Land Register data, which excludes lakes, ponds, glaciers > 1 km^{2} (0.386 sq mi or 247 acres) and river estuaries.

Annezin (French pronunciation: [anzɛ̃]) is a commune in the Pas-de-Calais department in the Hauts-de-France region of France.

== Geography ==
A large suburb situated immediately west of Béthune and 27 miles (43 km) southwest of Lille, at the junction of the D943 and the D181E roads.

== Population ==
The inhabitants are called Annezinois.

Historical population
Year	Pop.	±% p.a.
1968	5,399	—
1975	5,462	+0.17%
1982	5,857	+1.00%
1990	5,859	+0.00%
1999	5,551	−0.60%
2007	5,481	−0.16%
2012	5,830	+1.24%
2017	5,898	+0.23%
2023	5,825	−0.21%
Source: INSEE

== Sights ==
- The church of St. Martin, dating from the sixteenth century.
- Remains of an old watermill.

== See also ==
- Communes of the Pas-de-Calais department
