= Daniel Szechi =

British historian

Daniel Szechi is an historian and Professor of Early Modern History at the University of Manchester.

Szechi was educated at the University of Sheffield from 1976 to 1979 and St Antony's College, Oxford, where he did his D.Phil. He was then a University Research Fellow at Sheffield for three years and taught for a year at the University of Hull and then at St John's College, Oxford for nearly three years. Afterwards, he moved to America where he taught at Auburn University for eighteen years. In August 2006 he became Professor of Early Modern History at the University of Manchester.

== Works ==
- Jacobitism and Tory Politics, 1710-14 (Edinburgh: John Donald Press, 1984).
- Letters of George Lockhart of Carnwath, 1698-1732 (Edinburgh: Scottish History Society, 1989).
- (with Geoffrey Holmes), The Age of Oligarchy: Pre-Industrial Britain 1722-1783 (Longmans, 1993).
- The Jacobites. Britain and Europe, 1688-1788 (Manchester: Manchester University Press, 1994).
- 'Scotland's Ruine': Lockhart of Carnwath's Memoirs of the Union (Aberdeen: Association for Scottish Literary Studies, 1995).
- George Lockhart of Carnwath 1681-1731: a Study in Jacobitism (East Lothian: Tuckwell Press, 2002).
- 1715: the Great Jacobite Rebellion (New Haven: Yale University Press, 2006).
- Britain's Lost Revolution? (Manchester: Manchester University Press, 2015).
