= List of senators of Pas-de-Calais =

Location of Pas-de-Calais in France

Following is a list of senators of Pas-de-Calais, people who have represented the department of Pas-de-Calais in the Senate of France.

== Third Republic ==
Senators for Pas-de-Calais under the French Third Republic were:

- Louis Dubrulle (1876–1882)
- Charles du Campe de Rosamel (1876–1882)
- Auguste Paris (1876–1891)
- Auguste Huguet (1876–1919)
- Alfred Boucher-Cadart (1882–1884)
- Louis Devaux (1882–1884)
- François Hamille (1885)
- Louis Demiautte (1882–1891)
- Alphonse de Cardevac d'Havrincourt (1886–1891)
- Ernest Camescasse (1891–1897)
- André-Louis Deprez (1891–1900)
- Ferdinand Bouilliez (1891–1908)
- François Ringot (1892–1914)
- Jules Viseur (1897–1920)
- Alfred Leroy (1900–1901)
- Louis Boudenoot (1901–1922)
- Alexandre Ribot (1909–1923)
- Charles Jonnart (1914–1927)
- Henri Bachelet (1920–1930)
- Roger Farjon (1920–1940)
- Amédée Petit (1923)
- Jules Elby (1923–1933)
- Edmond Théret (1924–1934)
- Edmond Lefebvre du Prey (1927–1940)
- Henri Cadot (1930–1936)
- Alfred Salmon (1933–1936)
- Charles Delesalle (1934–1940)
- Paul Bachelet (1936–1940)
- Henri Elby (1936–1940)

== Fourth Republic ==
Senators for Pas-de-Calais under the French Fourth Republic were:

- Auguste Defrance (1946–1948)
- Philippe Gerber (1946–1948)
- Nestor Calonne (1946–1958)
- Bernard Chochoy (1946–1959)
- Émile Vanrullen (1946–1959)
- Jules Pouget (1948–1952)
- Émile Durieux (1948–1959)
- Gabriel Tellier (1948–1959)
- Georges Boulanger (1952–1959)
- Jean Bardol (1958–1959)

== Fifth Republic ==
Senators for Pas-de-Calais under the French Fifth Republic were:

Period	Name	Group	Notes
1959-1965	Jean Bardol	PCF	
1959-1965	Georges Boulanger	DVD	
1959-1965	Bernard Chochoy	SFIO	
1959-1965	Émile Durieux	SFIO	
1959-1965	Gabriel Tellier	CNIP	
1959-1965	Émile Vanrullen	SFIO	
1965-1974	Jean Bardol	PCF	
1965-1974	Bernard Chochoy	SFIO	
1965-1974	Michel Darras	SFIO	
1965-1974	Baudouin de Hauteclocque	CNIP	
1965-1974	Émile Durieux	SFIO	
1965-1974	Roger Poudonson	MRP	
1974-1983	Bernard Chochoy	PS	
1974-1983	Michel Darras	PS	
1974-1983	Baudouin de Hauteclocque	CNIP	
1974-1983	Émile Durieux	PS	
1974-1983	Léandre Létoquart	PCF	
1974-1983	Roger Poudonson	CD	
1983-1992	Henri Collette	RPR	
1983-1992	Michel Darras	PS	
1983-1992	André Delelis	PS	
1983-1992	Raymond Dumont	PCF	
1983-1992	Henri Elby	RI	Died in 1986
1983-1992	Daniel Percheron	PS	
1983-1992	Roger Poudonson	UDF	
1992-2001	Jean-Luc Bécart	PCF	
1992-2001	Désiré Debavelaere	RPR	
1992-2001	Jean-Paul Delevoye	RPR	
1992-2001	Léon Fatous	PS	
1992-2001	Roland Huguet	PS	
1992-2001	Daniel Percheron	PS	
1992-2001	Michel Sergent	PS	
2001-2011	Yves Coquelle	PCF	2001-2007
2001-2011	Maryse Roger-Coupin	PCF	
2001-2011	Jean-Claude Danglot	PCF	2007-2011
2001-2011	Jean-Paul Delevoye	RPR	2001-2002
2001-2011	Brigitte Bout	UMP	2002-2011
2001-2011	Françoise Henneron	DL UMP	
2001-2011	Daniel Percheron	PS	
2001-2011	Michèle San Vicente-Baudrin	PS	
2001-2011	Michel Sergent	PS	
2001-2011	Jean-Marie Vanlerenberghe	UDF then MoDem	
2011-2017	Natacha Bouchart	UMP then LR	2011-2015
2011-2017	Jean-François Rapin	LR	from 2015
2011-2017	Odette Duriez	PS	2011-2013
2011-2017	Hervé Poher	PS	from 2013
2011-2017	Catherine Génisson	PS	
2011-2017	Jean-Claude Leroy	PS	
2011-2017	Daniel Percheron	PS	
2011-2017	Jean-Marie Vanlerenberghe	MoDem then UDI	
2011-2017	Dominique Watrin	PCF	
2017-2023	Jean-François Rapin	LR	
2017-2023	Sabine Van Heghe	PS	
2017-2023	Catherine Fournier	UDI	
2017-2023	Michel Dagbert	PS	
2017-2023	Jean-Pierre Corbisez	PS	
2017-2023	Jean-Marie Vanlerenberghe	MoDem	
2017-2023	Dominique Watrin	PCF	

== Sources ==
- Liste des anciens sénateurs de la IIIème République par circonscription (in French), Sénat de France
- Liste des anciens sénateurs de la IVème République par circonscription (in French), Sénat de France
- Liste des anciens sénateurs de la Vème République par circonscription (in French), Sénat de France
- Liste par département - Pas-de-Calais (in French), Sénat de France
