= Elby =

Elby is a surname. Notable people with the name include:

- Brooke Elby (born 1993), American soccer player
- Henri Elby (1894–1974), French politician
- Henri Elby (1918–1986), French politician
- Jules Elby (1857–1933), French industrialist and politician
