= Henri Elby =

Henri Elby may refer to:

- Henri Elby (1894–1974), French politician
- Henri Elby (1918–1986), French politician
