= Thierry Frappé =

French politician (born 1952)

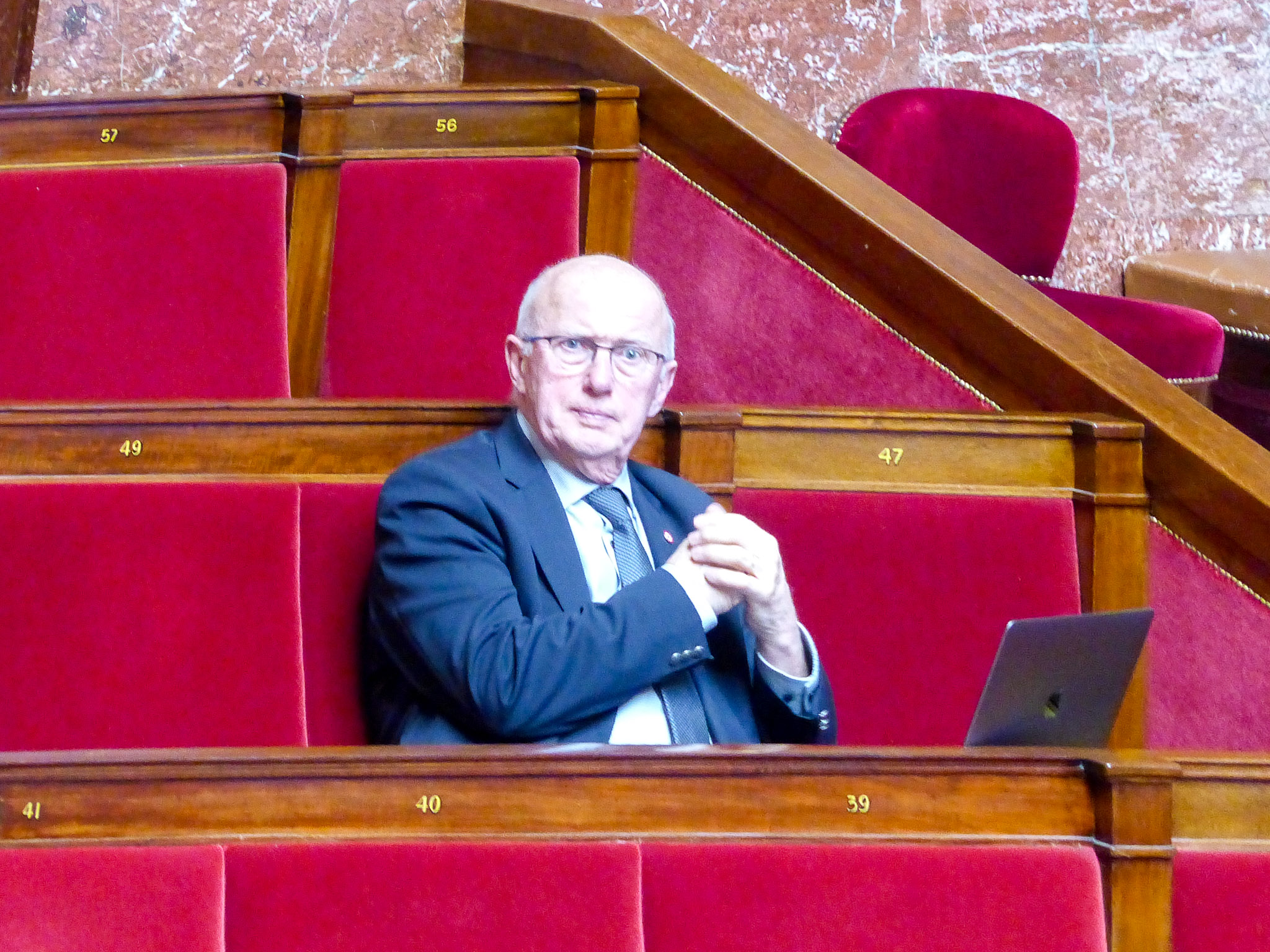

Member of the National Assembly for Pas-de-Calais's 10th constituency
- Incumbent
- Assumed office 22 June 2022
- Preceded by: Myriane Houplain

Personal details
- Born: 23 May 1952 (age 74) Forest-sur-Marque, France
- Party: National Rally
- Occupation: Doctor, politician

Thierry Frappé (born 23 May 1952) is a French politician of the National Rally (RN). He was elected to the National Assembly by Pas-de-Calais's 10th constituency in the 2022 election.

== Biography ==
Born in Forest-sur-Marque, Nord, Frappé is a retired medical doctor. In 2020 he was elected to the town council in Bruay-la-Buissière, Pas-de-Calais, and became deputy mayor to RN mayor Ludovic Pajot, who named him as mayor delegate in the associated former commune of Labuissière in December 2021.

Pajot was elected a deputy in the National Assembly representing Pas-de-Calais's 10th constituency in 2017. He stepped down in 2021 and was replaced by Myriane Houplain, who left the RN for Éric Zemmour's new Reconquête party before the 2022 elections. Frappé was then chosen as the RN candidate in the constituency. In the first round, he received 47.73% of the votes, one of the party's best performances. In the second round, he had the party's best performance of the election, receiving 65.4% of the votes in the run-off against Ensemble Citoyens candidate Michel Dagbert.

== Mandates ==
- Since 28 June 2020: First Deputy Mayor of Bruay-la-Buissière
- 11 December 2021 - 9 July 2022: Deputy Mayor of Labuissière
- Since 22 June 2022: MP for the 10th constituency of Pas-de-Calais
