= Joseph Joubert =

French essayist (1754–1824)

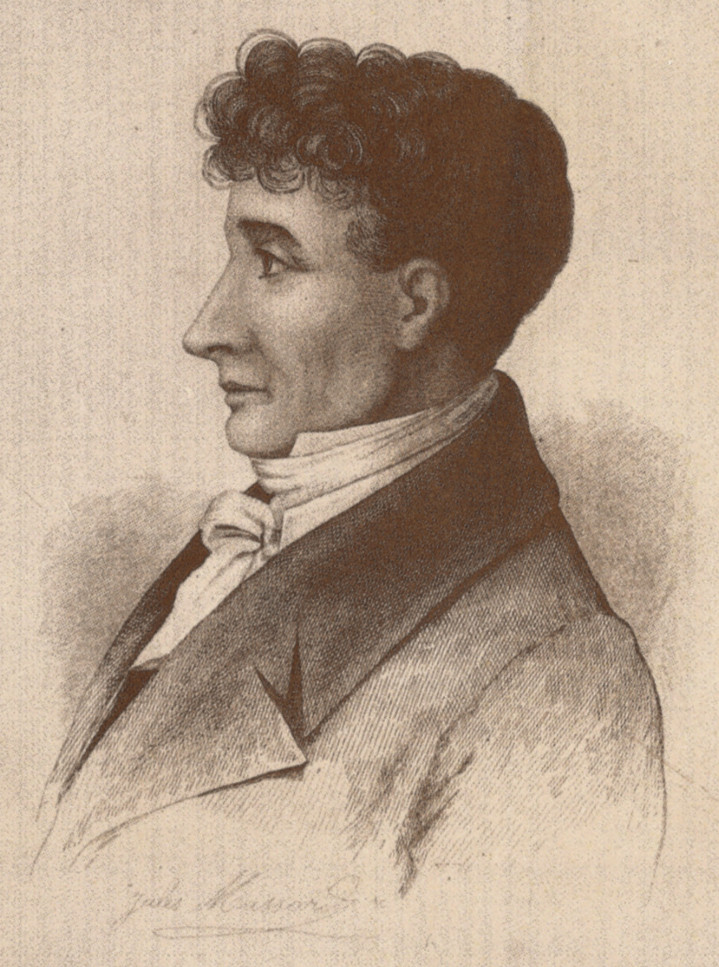
Joseph Joubert

Joseph Joubert (French: [ʒozɛf ʒubɛʁ]; 6 May 1754 in Montignac, Périgord – 4 May 1824 in Paris) was a French moralist and essayist, remembered today largely for his Pensées (Thoughts), which were published posthumously.

== Biography ==
From the age of fourteen Joubert attended a religious college in Toulouse, where he later taught until 1776. In 1778 he went to Paris where he met d'Alembert and Diderot, amongst others, and later became a friend of Chateaubriand, when the latter was a young writer and diplomat.

He alternated between living in Paris with his friends and life in the privacy of the countryside in Villeneuve-sur-Yonne, writing: "I have a hard time leaving Paris, because I have to leave my friends behind, and I have a hard time leaving the countryside, because I have to leave myself behind."

He was appointed inspector-general of universities under Napoleon.

Joubert published nothing during his lifetime, but he wrote a copious number of letters and filled sheets of paper and small notebooks with thoughts about the nature of human existence, literature, Christianity and spiritual life, and other topics, in a poignant, often aphoristic style. After his death his widow entrusted Chateaubriand with these notes, and in 1838, he published a selection titled, Recueil des pensées de M. Joubert (Collected Thoughts of Mr. Joubert). More complete editions were to follow, as were collections of Joubert's correspondence.

Somewhat of the Epicurean school of philosophy, Joubert even valued his own frequent suffering of ill health, as he believed sickness gave subtlety to the soul. He belongs to the tradition of the so-called “French moralists.”

Joubert's works have been translated into numerous languages. In 1866 "Some of the 'Thoughts' of Joseph Joubert" were translated by George H. Calvert. They were later translated into English again by Paul Auster. Matthew Arnold in his Critical Essays devotes a section to Joubert.

== Principal editions ==
- Recueil des pensées de M. Joubert, published by Chateaubriand, Le Normant, Paris, 1838. Text online
- Pensées, essais, maximes et correspondance de J. Joubert, preface by Paul Raynal, Le Normant, Paris, 1850; 1861.
- Pensées, introduction and noted by Victor Giraud, Bloud, Paris, 1909
- Carnets, texts collected by André Beaunier, Gallimard, Paris, 1938; 1994
- Correspondance de Louis de Fontanes et de Joseph Joubert : (1785-1819), Plon, Paris, 1943
- Pensées et Lettres, organized by Raymond Dumay and Maurice Andrieux, Grasset, 1954
- Pensées, selected texts presented by Raymond Dumay, Club français du livre, 1954
- Essais : 1779-1821, complete critical version by Rémy Tessonneau, A.G. Nizet, Paris, 1983
