= Remaisnil =

- Commune
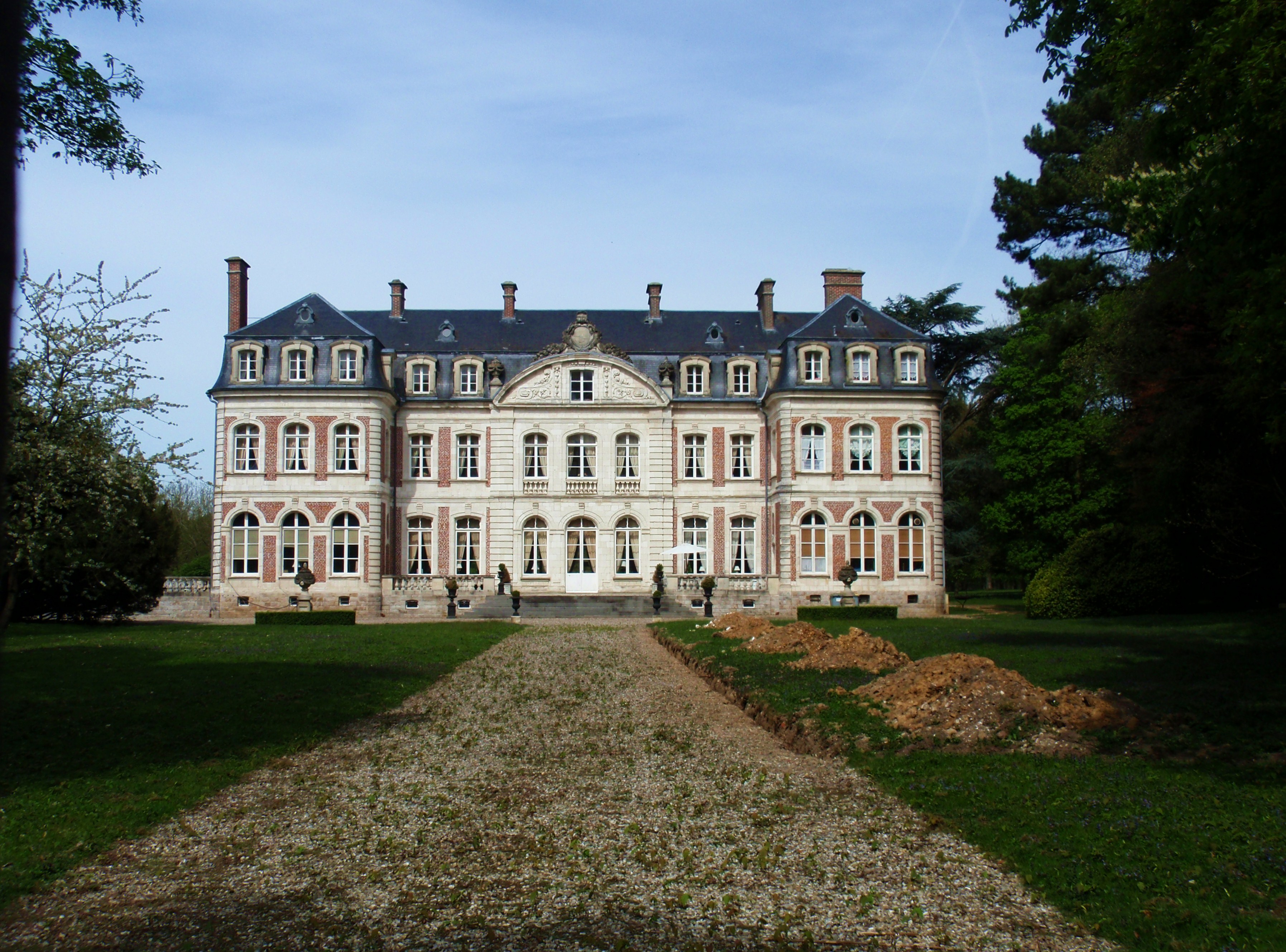
- The chateau in Remaisnil
- Location of Remaisnil
- Location within France Location within Hauts-de-France
- Coordinates: 50°12′03″N 2°14′46″E
- Country: France
- Region: Hauts-de-France
- Department: Somme
- Arrondissement: Amiens
- Canton: Doullens
- Intercommunality: CC Territoire Nord Picardie

Government
  - Mayor (2020–2026): Catherine Niquet
- Area^{1}: 2.92 km^{2} (1.13 sq mi)
- Elevation: 154 m (505 ft)
- Highest elevation: 153 m (502 ft)
- Lowest elevation: 65 m (213 ft)
- Population (2023): 28
  - Density: 9.6/km^{2} (25/sq mi)
- Time zone: UTC+01:00 (CET)
  - Summer (DST): UTC+02:00 (CEST)
- INSEE/Postal code: 80666 /80600
- ^{1} French Land Register data, which excludes lakes, ponds, glaciers > 1 km^{2} (0.386 sq mi or 247 acres) and river estuaries.

Remaisnil (French pronunciation: [ʁəmɛnil]; Picard: Rémini) is a commune in the Somme department in Hauts-de-France in northern France. The village contains the Château de Remaisnil, which was owned by Jules Elby and Laura Ashley. In the field across from the mansion, remnants of a German V-1 Flying Bomb launch site are visible as well.

== Geography ==
Remaisnil is situated 15 miles (24 km) northeast of Abbeville, on the D459 road

== Population ==
Historical population
Year	Pop.	±% p.a.
1968	54	—
1975	45	−2.57%
1982	53	+2.37%
1990	40	−3.46%
1999	35	−1.47%
2007	38	+1.03%
2012	37	−0.53%
2017	29	−4.76%
2023	28	−0.58%
Source: INSEE

== See also ==
- Communes of the Somme department
