= Pas-de-Calais's 10th constituency =

Constituency of the National Assembly of France

10th constituency of the Pas-de-Calais
- inline Constituency of the National Assembly of France

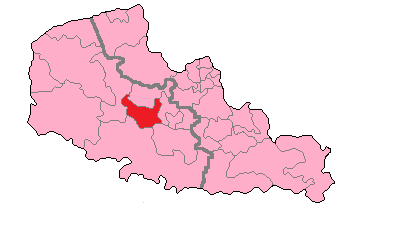
- Pas-de-Calais' 10th Constituency shown within Nord-Pas-de-Calais
- Deputy: Thierry Frappé; RN
- Department: Pas-de-Calais
- Cantons: Barlin, Bruay-la-Buissière, Divion, Houdain, Nœux-les-Mines, Sains-en-Gohelle
- Registered voters: 89,833

The 10th constituency of the Pas-de-Calais is a French legislative constituency in the Pas-de-Calais département.

== Description ==
Pas-de-Calais' 10th constituency lies in the centre of the department centred on the coal mining areas surrounding Nœux-les-Mines.

The communist Maurice Andrieux represented the constituency between 1967 and 1981. The constituency returned Socialist Party representatives at every election from 1988 to 2012, and National Front/National Rally representatives since 2017.

== Historical representatives ==
Election	Member	Party
1986	Proportional representation - no election by constituency	
1988	Marcel Wacheux	PS
1993	Serge Janquin	PS
1997	Serge Janquin	PS
2002	Serge Janquin	PS
2007	Serge Janquin	PS
2012	Serge Janquin	PS
2017	Ludovic Pajot	FN
2021	Myriane Houplain	FN
2022	Myriane Houplain	REC
2022	Thierry Frappé	RN
2024	Thierry Frappé	RN

== Election results ==
=== 2024 ===
Candidate	Party	Alliance	First round			Second round		
Candidate	Party	Alliance	Votes	%	+/–	Votes	%	+/–
Thierry Frappé	RN		32,530	60.61	+12.88			
Emmanuelle Leveugle	PS	NFP	10,085	18.79	+1.54			
Thomas Buttin	LR	UDC	5,635	10.50	+8.14			
Léo Luniewski	RE	Ensemble	4,571	8.52	-9.66			
Eric Robaszkiewicz	LO		851	1.59	+0.13			
Votes			53,672	100.00				
Valid votes			53,672	96.92	-0.28			
Blank votes			1,136	2.05	+0.18			
Null votes			569	1.03	+0.10			
Turnout			55,377	62.16	+17.92			
Abstentions			33,718	37.84	-17.92			
Registered voters			89,095					
Result			RN HOLD					

=== 2022 ===
Legislative Election 2022: Pas-de-Calais's 10th constituency
Party	Candidate	Votes	%	±%
RN	Thierry Frappé	18,230	47.73	+16.43
LREM (Ensemble)	Michel Dagbert	6,945	18.18	-2.34
LFI (NUPÉS)	Sandrine Coquerie	6,587	17.25	−20.74
DVE	Davy Carincotte	1,627	4.26	N/A
DVG	Ludivine Rus	1,434	3.75	N/A
LR (UDC)	Françoise Vantouroux	903	2.36	−2.91
REC	Myriane Houplain	898	2.35	N/A
Others	N/A	1,571	4.11	
Turnout		38,195	44.24	−1.87
2nd round result
RN	Thierry Frappé	22,685	65.40	+12.82
LREM (Ensemble)	Michel Dagbert	12,003	34.60	−12.82
Turnout		34,688	42.18	+0.69
RN hold				

=== 2017 ===
Candidate	Label	First round		Second round	
Candidate	Label	Votes	%	Votes	%
Ludovic Pajot	FN	12,676	31.30	17,854	52.58
Laurence Deschanel	REM	8,309	20.52	16,105	47.42
Bernard Cailliau	PS	7,260	17.93		
Gauthier Jankowski	FI	5,192	12.82		
Nesrédine Ramdani	LR	2,133	5.27		
Ludovic Guyot	PCF	1,998	4.93		
Lisette Sudic	ECO	936	2.31		
Davy Carincotte	DVD	659	1.63		
Marie-Danièle Duquenne	EXG	591	1.46		
Richard Markiewicz	DVG	436	1.08		
Alizée Dopierala	DIV	257	0.63		
Cédric Courtecuisse	DVG	49	0.12		
Votes		40,496	100.00	33,959	100.00
Valid votes		40,496	97.29	33,959	90.68
Blank votes		821	1.97	2,261	6.04
Null votes		306	0.74	1,229	3.28
Turnout		41,623	46.11	37,449	41.49
Abstentions		48,653	53.89	52,822	58.51
Registered voters		90,276		90,271	
Source: Ministry of the Interior

=== 2012 ===
Legislative Election 2012: Pas-de-Calais's 10th constituency
Party	Candidate	Votes	%	±%
PS	Serge Janquin	20,962	45.08	+7.17
FN	Monique Lamare	10,067	21.65	+16.50
UMP	Maureen Leleu	6,826	14.68	−2.64
FG	Thomas Boulard	4,613	9.92	−2.56
Others	N/A	4,035		
Turnout		46,503	51.77	−5.99
2nd round result
PS	Serge Janquin	27,069	63.41	−4.49
FN	Monique Lamare	15,620	36.59	N/A
Turnout		42,689	47.52	−7.14
PS hold				

=== 2007 ===
Legislative Election 2007: Pas-de-Calais's 10th constituency
Party	Candidate	Votes	%	±%
PS	Serge Janquin	15,431	37.91	
UMP	Isabelle Morel	7,049	17.32	
PCF	Daniel Dewalle	5,082	12.48	
DIV	Richard Jarrett	5,078	12.47	
FN	Chantal Bojanek	2,096	5.15	
MoDem	Annie Delannoy-Jumez	1,550	3.81	
Far left	Olivier Vasse	969	2.38	
LV	Lisette Sudic	888	2.18	
Others	N/A	2,563		
Turnout		41,816	57.76	
2nd round result
PS	Serge Janquin	25,496	67.90	
UMP	Isabelle Morel	12,055	32.10	
Turnout		39,575	54.66	
PS hold				

=== 2002 ===
Legislative Election 2002: Pas-de-Calais's 10th constituency
Party	Candidate	Votes	%	±%
PS	Serge Janquin	15,490	37.62	
UMP	Isabelle Morel	7,062	17.15	
PCF	Daniel Dewalle	6,773	16.45	
FN	Jean-Baptiste Morchipont	5,871	14.26	
LO	Marie-Daniele Duquenne	1,193	2.90	
Others	N/A	4,789		
Turnout		42,758	59.35	
2nd round result
PS	Serge Janquin	24,096	67.22	
UMP	Isabelle Morel	11,749	32.78	
Turnout		38,566	53.54	
PS hold				

=== 1997 ===
Legislative Election 1997: Pas-de-Calais's 10th constituency
Party	Candidate	Votes	%	±%
PS	Serge Janquin	18,506	37.64	
PCF	Daniel Dewalle*	12,376	25.17	
RPR	Daniel Mouton	6,591	13.41	
FN	Jean-Paul Depret	5,917	12.04	
LV	Daniel Ludwikowski	2,495	5.07	
LO	Gérard Delimard	1,899	3.86	
DVD	Daniel Lecucq	1,379	2.80	
Turnout		51,945	72.30	
2nd round result
PS	Serge Janquin	29,280	100.00	
Turnout		39,556	55.06	
PS hold				

* Withdrew before the 2nd round

== Sources ==
- Official results of French elections from 1998: "Résultats électoraux officiels en France" (in French).
