= Myriane =

Myriane is a French feminine given name. Notable people with the name include:

- Myriane Houplain (born 1947), French politician
- Myriane Samson (born 1988), Canadian figure skater

== See also ==
- Marianne
- Myria
