= Hôtel de Ville, Bruay-la-Buissière =

Town hall in Bruay-la-Buissière, France

Hôtel de Ville
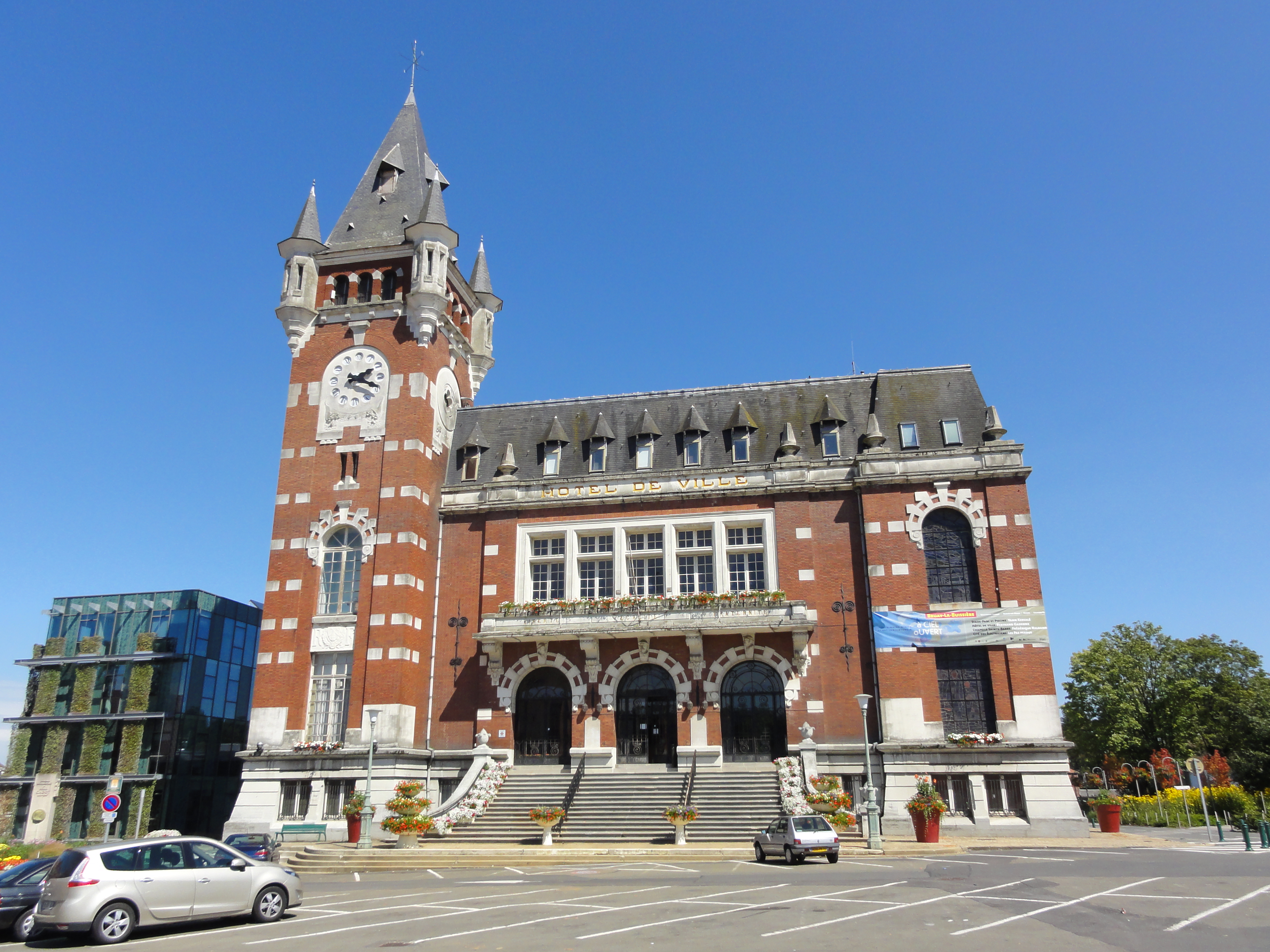
- The main frontage of the Hôtel de Ville in the August 2011

General information
- Type: City hall
- Architectural style: Flemish Renaissance Revival style
- Location: Bruay-la-Buissière, France
- Coordinates: 50.4821°N 2.5457°E
- Completed: 1931

Height
- Height: 47 metres (154 ft)

Design and construction
- Architects: René and Paul Hanote

Monument historique
- Official name: Hôtel de ville
- Type: Inscrit
- Designated: 2009
- Reference no.: PA62000007

The Hôtel de Ville (French pronunciation: [otɛl də vil], City Hall) is a municipal building in Bruay-la-Buissière, Pas-de-Calais, in northern France, standing on Place Henri Cadot. It was designated a monument historique by the French government in 2009.

== History ==
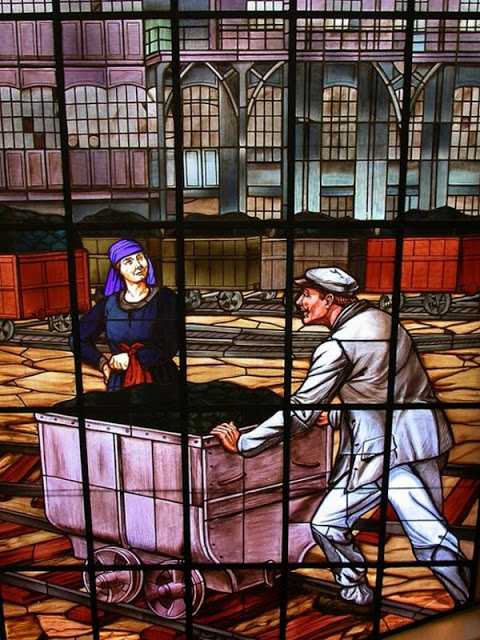
Stained glass window depicting mineworking operations

After the French Revolution, the new town council initially met in the home of the mayor at the time. This arrangement continued until the 1870s, when the council led by the mayor, Jules Marmottan, established a town hall on what is now Rue Marmottan. After the old town hall was no longer required for municipal use, it became the home of the Conservatoire de Musique (music conservatory).

In the 1920s, following significant population growth largely associated with the mining industry, the council led by the mayor, Henri Cadot, decided to commission a more substantial town hall. The site they selected faced onto what is now Place Henri Cadot. The foundation stone was laid in 1928. The building was designed by René and Paul Hanote in the Flemish Renaissance Revival style, built in red brick with stone finishings and was officially opened on 27 September 1931.

The design involved an asymmetric main frontage of five bays facing onto what is now Place Henri Cadot. The left-hand bay, which was slightly projected forward, was formed by a five-stage tower. There was a casement window in the first stage, a round-headed window in the second stage, a pair of lancet windows in the third stage, a clock in the fourth stage and three small round-headed openings in the fifth stage. The fifth stage was enhanced by bartizans at the corners and surmounted by a pyramid-shaped roof. The whole tower was 47 metres (154 ft) high.

The central section of three bays featured a wide flight of steps leading up to three openings with keystones and voussoirs on the ground floor, and a five-part mullioned and transomed window on the first floor. The right-hand bay, which was also slightly projected forward, was fenestrated by a square-headed stained glass window on the ground floor and by a round-headed stained glass window on the first floor, and surmounted by a mansard roof. The stained glass windows, which depicted mineworking operations undertaken by the Bruay Mining Company, were made by Labille & Bertrand and completed in 1929. Internally, the principal rooms were the Salle des Mariages (wedding room) and the Salle du Conseil (council chamber) on the top floor.

A war memorial in the form of an obelisk created by Paul Hanote to commemorate the lives of local service personnel who had died in the First World War and which had originally been placed in the Place du Cercle in 1920, was transferred to the square in front of the town hall after it opened.

An extensive programme of restoration work on the exterior of the building and its stained glass windows was undertaken between 1976 and 1977. The roof of the building was badly damaged by a fire which broke out while repair works were being undertaken on 8 January 2017. Polling for the 2017 French legislative election had to take place in an adjacent building on 11 June 2017. The restoration of the roof was completed in June 2022 and the building was re-opened in September 2022.
