= Alfred Leroy =

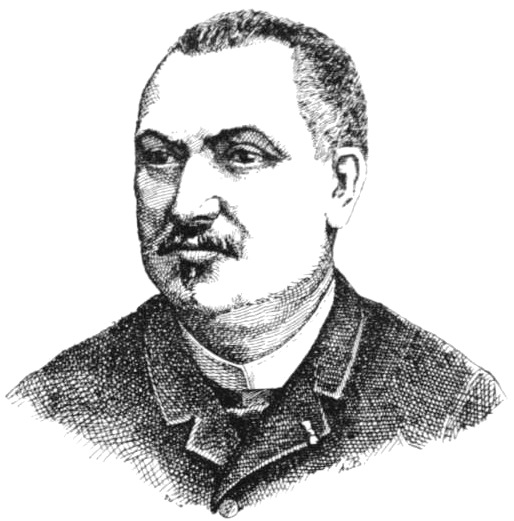
Portrait of Alfred-Désiré-Louis-Joseph Leroy

Alfred-Désiré-Louis-Joseph Leroy (18 August 1837 – 7 August 1901) was a French industrialist and politician who sat in the Senate from 1900 to 1901.

He entered the Bruay Mining Company in 1872, and became general manager in 1897. He was mayor of Bruay-en-Artois from 1879 to 1900 and general councillor of the Canton of Houdain. He was made an officer of the Legion of Honour in 1897. On 29 April 1900 he was elected to the Senate representing Pas-de-Calais, where he was associated with the Republican Union group. He died in office in 1901.

One of his daughters, Mathilde, married Jules Elby, who succeeded his father-in-law at the Bruay Mining Company and in the Senate.
