= Myriane Houplain =

French politician

Myriane Houplin MP

Member of the National Assembly for Pas-de-Calais's 10th constituency
- In office 22 April 2021 – 21 June 2022
- Preceded by: Ludovic Pajot
- Succeeded by: Thierry Frappé

Personal details
- Born: 5 June 1946 (age 79) France
- Party: Reconquête (since 2022)
- Other political affiliations: National Rally (until 2022)

Myriane Houplain (born 5 June 1946) is a French politician. Houplain became the Member of Parliament for Pas-de-Calais's 10th constituency in 2021. She has been a member of the Union French Democracy, of the National Rally and, as of 2023, of Reconquete.

== Career ==
In the 2017 French legislative election, Houplain was the substitute for Ludovic Pajot. She replaced Pajot as an MP after he was elected mayor of Bruay-la-Buissière.

She left the National Rally in 2022. She sought re-election in the 2022 French legislative election under the Reconquête banner. She was eliminated in the first round, losing her seat. The seat was won by National Rally candidate Thierry Frappé in the second round.

== Personal life ==
Houplin lives in Beuvry.

== See also ==
- List of deputies of the 15th National Assembly of France
