= Maurice Andrieux =

French politician (1925–2008)

Maurice Andrieux (17 April 1925, in Hersin-Coupigny – 8 December 2008, in Toulouse) was a French communist politician.

Andrieux worked as a teacher and journalist. He served as editor-in-chief of Tribune des mineurs ('Miners' Tribune') in Lens 1948-1951 and as secretary general of Ce Soir in Paris 1951–1953. Andrieux became mayor of Hersin-Coupigny in 1959. He was a member of parliament from the 10th constituency of Pas-de-Calais) between 1967 and 1981.

== Biography ==
He was mayor of Hersin-Coupigny from 1959 to 1988 and general councilor for the canton of Bully-les-Mines from 1976 to 1982. A Journalist by profession, he served as editor-in-chief of the Tribune des mineurs de Lens from 1948 to 1951, then as secretary-general of the daily newspaper Ce soir from 1951 to 1953.

Elected in 1967 in the tenth district of Pas-de-Calais, he sat with the Communist group. He became Vice-President of the National Assembly on April 2, 1977, succeeding Guy Ducoloné, and remained in office until the end of the legislative term. Although he was consistently re-elected, he retired in 1981 after coming in second place to the Socialist Party (France) candidate, Marcel Wacheux.
