= Michèle San Vicente-Baudrin =

French politician (born 1955)

Michèle San Vicente-Baudrin (born 19 May 1955) is a former member of the Senate of France, representing the Pas-de-Calais department from 2001 to 2011. She is a member of the Socialist Party.
