= Château de Remaisnil =

Château in Hauts-de-France, France

Coordinates: 50.1995°N 2.2420°E

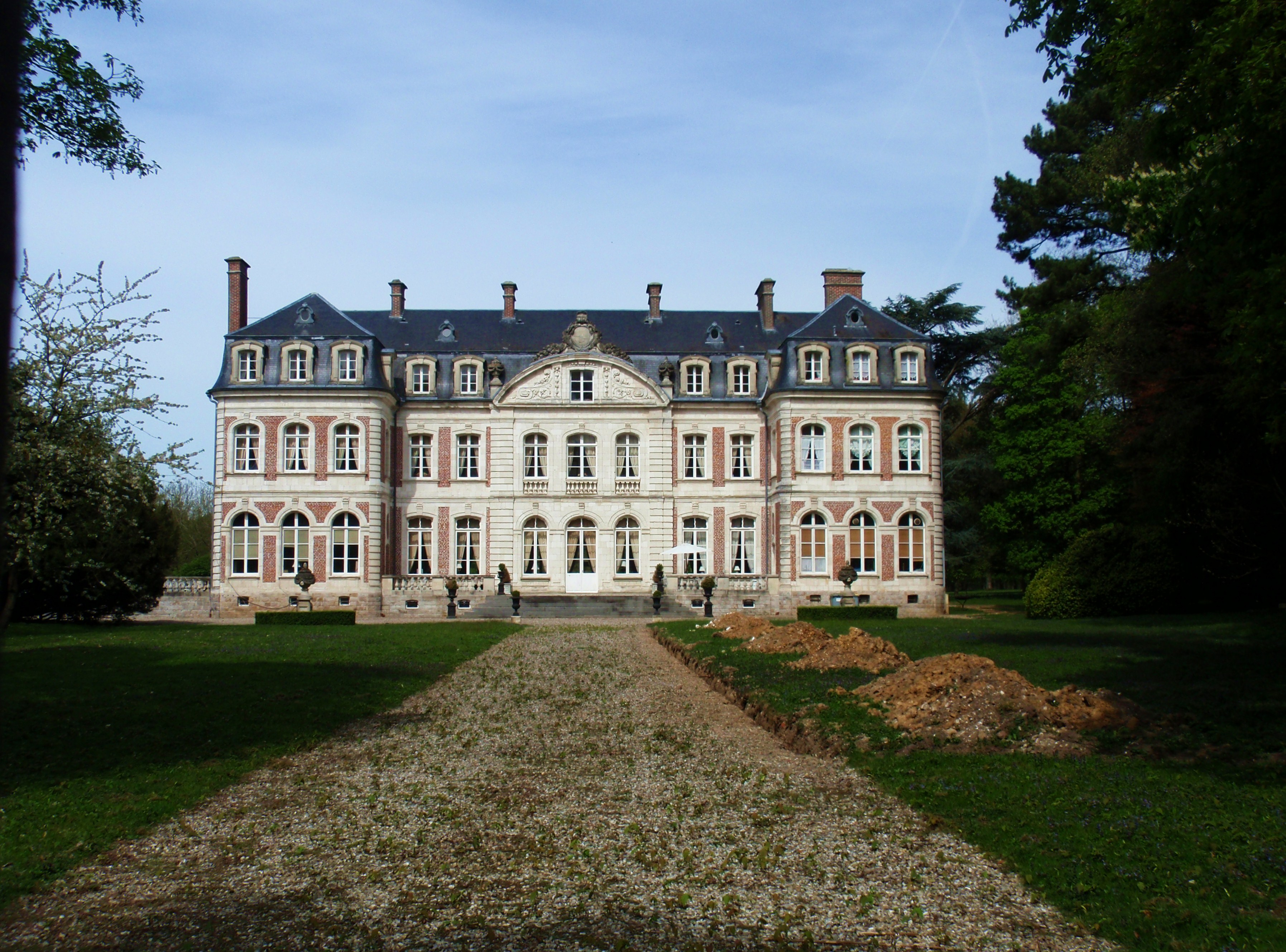
- The château from the front
- Interactive map of the Château de Remaisnil area

General information
- Type: Château
- Architectural style: French Baroque
- Location: Remaisnil, 80600 Remaisnil, Somme, France
- Completed: 1760

The Château de Remaisnil is an 18th-century château situated on the edge of the French village of Remaisnil, in the Somme department of Picardy. It has been a listed historical monument since 1986.

The house was built in 1760 on the site of a former medieval castle. For centuries, the house and surrounding lands remained in the same noble family, the viscounts de Butler. In the late nineteenth century it came into the possession of Senator Jules Elby, connected by marriage to the Leroy and du Merle families. A member of the Elby family was involved in the design of the Paris Métro, and a white-tiled underground passageway still exists between the château and its former stables. During the First World War, the château was used by the British Army as an operations centre and Remaisnil lies close to the Somme battlefields. Following the German invasion of France in 1940 during the Second World War, the house was occupied by the Germans as officers' quarters, and a V-1 flying bomb launch site was constructed in the parkland, of which the foundation of part of the launch apparatus is still visible. Following the war the then-dilapidated house was retained by the Elby family until the late 1950s.

In the late 1970s, the château was bought by Laura Ashley and her husband, Bernard Ashley, who conducted extensive renovation work on the fabric of the building and re-designed the interiors. In 1987, the château was purchased by Americans Adrian and Susan Doull, who turned it into a hotel and conference centre. It was subsequently re-sold as a hotel, and is now privately owned.

Although the traditional estate of the house has been reduced in size, today the château retains 35 acres of parkland. The grounds contain a walled garden, tennis court and swimming pool, and an English garden designed by Laura Ashley. The house itself has five grand reception rooms, some of which retain decorative features from the reign of Louis XV.
