= Serge Janquin =

French politician (1943–2024)

Serge Janquin (5 August 1943 – 28 September 2024) was a French politician who was a member of the National Assembly of France. He represented the Pas-de-Calais department between 1993 and 2017, and was a member of the Socialiste, radical, citoyen et divers gauche group. He did not run for a sixth term in 2017. Ludovic Pajot from the National Front succeeded him. Janquin died on 28 September 2024, at the age of 81.
