= Françoise Henneron =

French politician (born 1948)

Françoise Henneron (born 3 February 1948) is a French politician and a former member of the Senate of France. She represented the Pas-de-Calais department from 2001 to 2011 and is a member of the Union for a Popular Movement Party.
