= Michel Sergent =

French politician (born 1943

Michel Sergent (French pronunciation: [miʃɛl sɛʁʒɑ̃]; born 27 December 1943, in Desvres) is a former member of the Senate of France who represented the Pas-de-Calais department from 1992 to 2011. He is a member of the Socialist Party.
