= Ludovic Pajot =

French politician

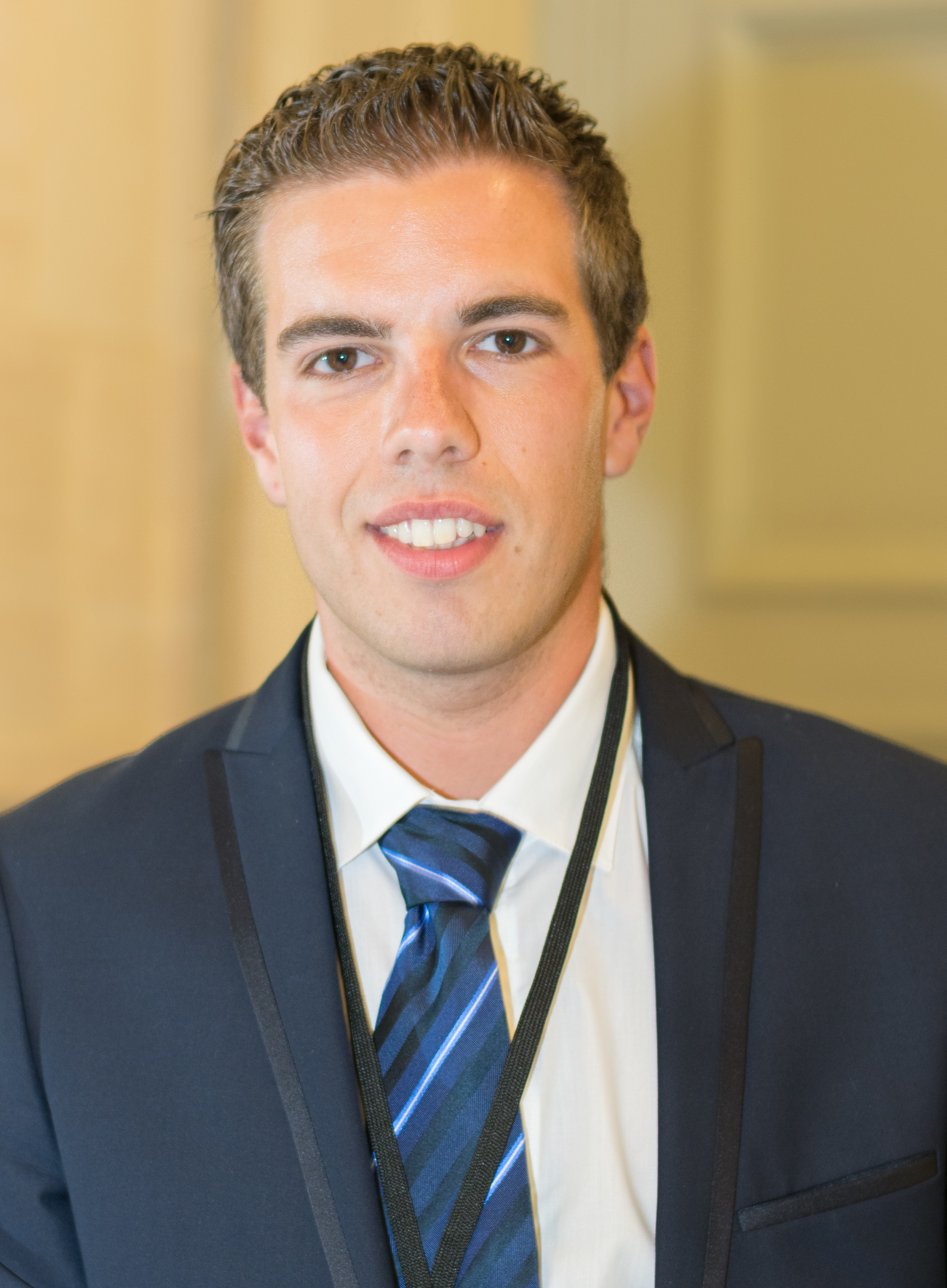

Member of the National Assembly for Pas-de-Calais's 10th constituency
- In office 21 June 2017 – 22 April 2021
- Preceded by: Serge Janquin
- Succeeded by: Myriane Houplain

Mayor of Bruay-la-Buissière
- Incumbent
- Assumed office 5 July 2020
- Preceded by: Olivier Switaj

Member of the Regional Council of Hauts-de-France
- Incumbent
- Assumed office 4 January 2016

Personal details
- Born: 18 November 1993 (age 32) Beuvry, France
- Party: National Rally (2012–present)
- Education: Lille Catholic University

Ludovic Pajot (born 18 November 1993) is a French politician who served as the member of the National Assembly for the 10th constituency of Pas-de-Calais from 2017 to 2021. A member of the National Rally (until 2018 named National Front), he has been Mayor of Bruay-la-Buissière since 2020. At age 24 in 2017, Pajot was the youngest member of the 15th National Assembly. He previously was a municipal councillor in Béthune, first elected in 2014.

== Biography ==
=== Studies and early life ===
Ludovic Pajot was born into a farming family. He studied law at Lille Catholic University. In 2012, he joined the National Front.

He was elected a municipal councillor of Béthune in 2014 and regional councillor of Hauts-de-France in 2015. Upon his election as a parliamentarian, he resigned from the municipal council of Béthune.

=== Member of the National Assembly ===
In the 2017 legislative election, he was elected in the second round to Parliament for the 10th constituency of Pas-de-Calais, with over 52% of the votes cast, against the La République En Marche! candidate, Laurence Deschanel. He became the youngest member of the National Assembly elected in the 2017 election, as well as the second under the Fifth Republic, after Marion Maréchal, who was aged 22 when she took office in 2012.

He sits, along with the other National Rally members, among the unregistered members of the National Assembly. He is part of the Committee on Sustainable Development and Spatial Planning.

On 7 October 2017, he was the victim of an assault in Béthune. He was hospitalised with a five-day work incapacity. He stated that the attackers were "a group of individuals, some of which claim to be from the antifa far-left". One of his alleged attackers admitted to being hostile toward the National Front, while a second explained the assault was due to excessive alcohol consumption.

=== Mayor of Bruay-la-Buissière ===
In the 2020 municipal election in Bruay-la-Buissière, he led the National Rally list. He was subsequently elected to the mayorship. He was replaced by his substitute Myriane Houplain in the National Assembly on 22 April 2021.

== Offices held ==
- Municipal councillor of Béthune: 5 April 2014 – 2 August 2017
- Regional councillor of Hauts-de-France: 4 January 2016 – Present
- Member of the National Assembly for the 10th constituency of Pas-de-Calais: 21 June 2017 – 22 April 2021
- Mayor of Bruay-la-Buissière: 5 July 2020 – Present
