= Hersin-Coupigny =

- Commune
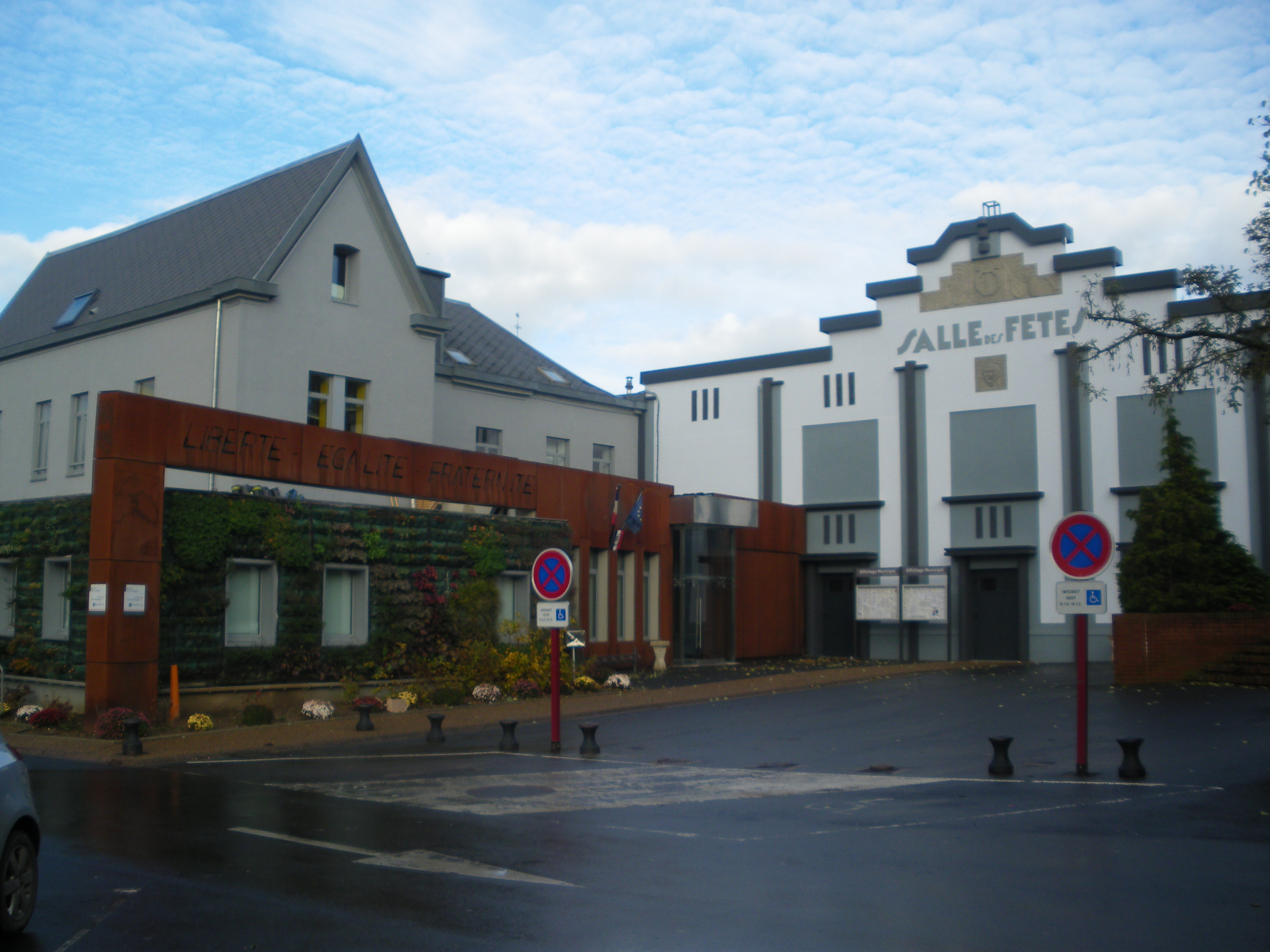
- The town hall and festival hall of Hersin-Coupigny

- Coat of arms
- Location of Hersin-Coupigny
- Location within France Location within Hauts-de-France
- Coordinates: 50°26′49″N 2°38′56″E
- Country: France
- Region: Hauts-de-France
- Department: Pas-de-Calais
- Arrondissement: Béthune
- Canton: Nœux-les-Mines
- Intercommunality: CA Béthune-Bruay, Artois-Lys Romane

Government
  - Mayor (2020–2026): Jean-Marie Caramiaux
- Area^{1}: 12.02 km^{2} (4.64 sq mi)
- Elevation: 82 m (269 ft)
- Highest elevation: 186 m (610 ft)
- Lowest elevation: 46 m (151 ft)
- Population (2023): 6,082
  - Density: 506.0/km^{2} (1,311/sq mi)
- Time zone: UTC+01:00 (CET)
  - Summer (DST): UTC+02:00 (CEST)
- INSEE/Postal code: 62443 /62530
- ^{1} French Land Register data, which excludes lakes, ponds, glaciers > 1 km^{2} (0.386 sq mi or 247 acres) and river estuaries.

Hersin-Coupigny (French pronunciation: [ɛʁsɛ̃ kupiɲi]; Picard: Hérsin-Coupigny) is a commune in the Pas-de-Calais department in the Hauts-de-France region of France about 6 miles (9.7 km) west of Lens.

== Population ==
Historical population
Year	Pop.	±% p.a.
1968	7,980	—
1975	7,500	−0.88%
1982	7,015	−0.95%
1990	6,679	−0.61%
1999	6,498	−0.30%
2007	6,310	−0.37%
2012	6,118	−0.62%
2017	6,245	+0.41%
2023	6,082	−0.44%
Source: INSEE

== See also ==
- Communes of the Pas-de-Calais department
