= Henri Elby (1894–1974) =

French industrialist and politician (1894–1974)

Henri Jules Elby (15 July 1894 – 10 December 1974) was a French industrialist and politician who was a Senator from 1936 to 1944.

He was the second son of Jules Elby and Mathilde Leroy, and was raised at the Château de Remaisnil. He served in the French Army during the First World War, during which he was wounded. He ended the war as a lieutenant of artillery.

He spent most of his career as a company manager, latterly as President of the Chamber of Commerce of Béthune. He first stood for election to the National Assembly in the 1936 French legislative election, running in Montreuil as an Independent Radical candidate, but was beaten by the Radical Party.

On 8 November 1936, he was the Republican candidate for his father's former Pas-de-Calais seat in a Senate by-election. After his election he sat with the Democratic and Radical Union. In 1937, he was appointed a member of the Customs and Mining Commissions, and in 1938 he became a member of the Navy Commission. On 10 July 1940, he voted with the majority in the Senate in favour of drafting a new constitution and granting Philippe Pétain full powers following the Fall of France.

After the war, Henri Elby was elected to the Pas-de-Calais General Council to represent the canton of Montreuil-sur-Mer. He participated in the legislative elections of November 1958. His son, also called Henri Elby, was a politician.
