= Henri Elby (1918–1986) =

French politician

Henri Elby (22 November 1918 – 31 July 1986) was a French politician who represented Pas-de-Calais in the Senate from 1983 to 1986.

Elby was the son of Henri Elby and the grandson of Jules Elby. He was elected to the Senate in 1983 and sat in the Union of Republicans and Independents (UREI) group. He was a member of the Committee on Economic Affairs. He died in office in 1986.

He was a knight of the National Order of Merit.
