= Bruay Mining Company =

French coal extraction company

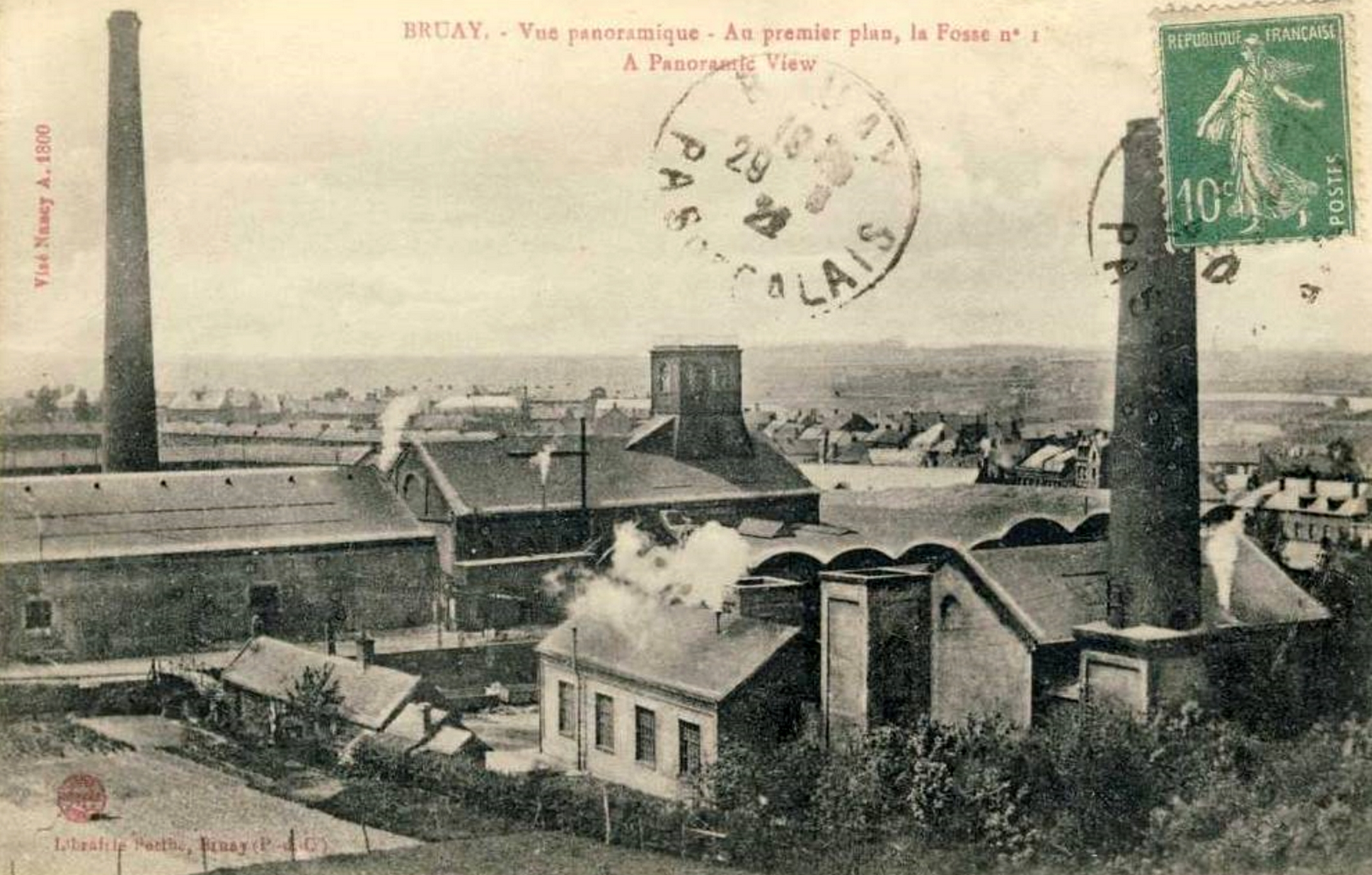
Bruay pit No.1 from the rear at the beginning of the 20th century.

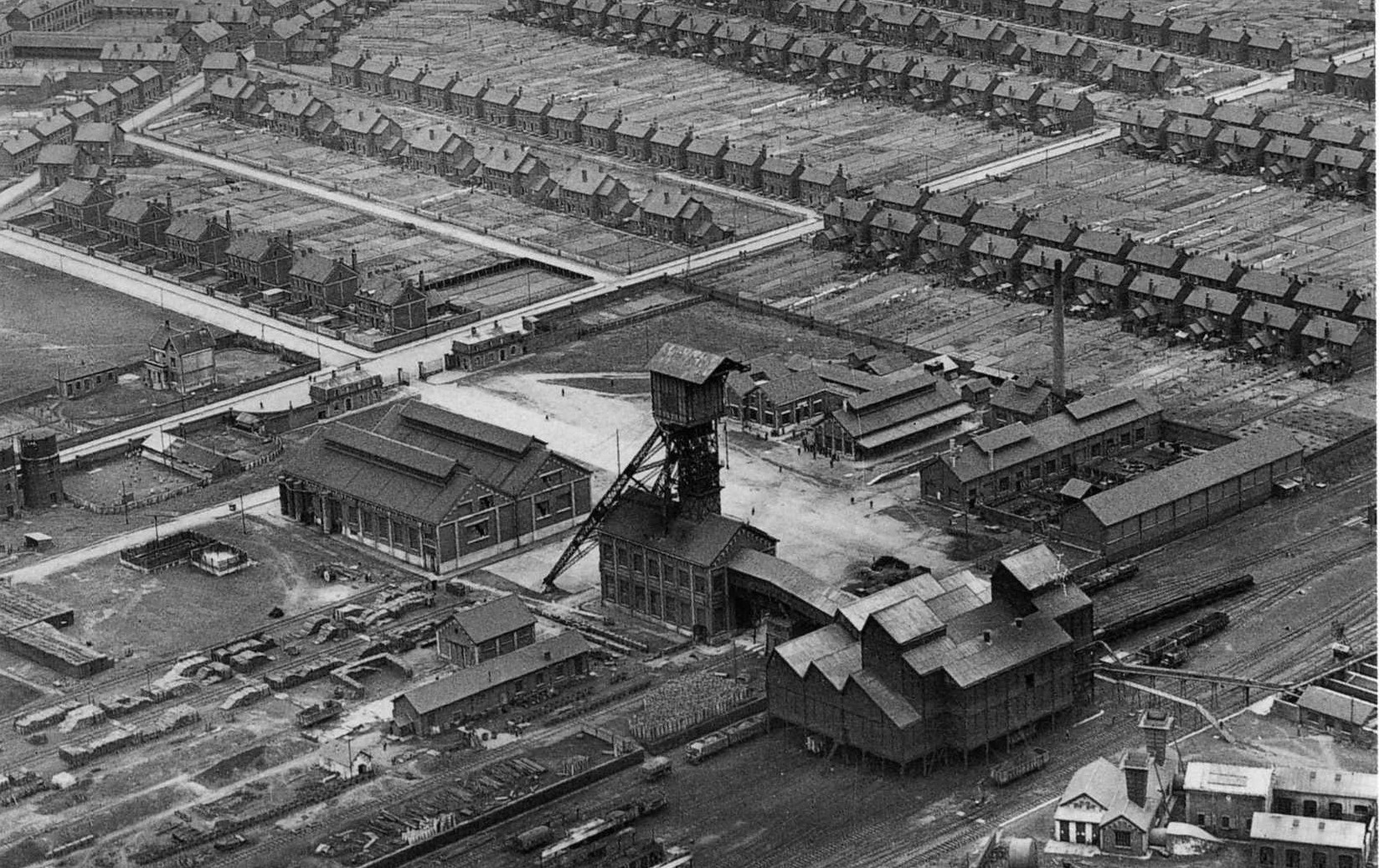
Bruay Mining Company's pit No.7 in 1935, with workers' houses in the background.

The Compagnie des mines de Bruay (English: Bruay Mining Company) was a French coal extraction company which operated in the Nord-Pas de Calais Mining Basin between 1850 and 1946. It operated 18 mine shafts at eight production sites in Bruay-la-Buissière, Haillicourt, Divion and Houdain.

The company's first pit was opened at the end of 1852 in Bruay, and a further seven had opened nearby by 1854. Four more were dug from 1864 to 1866, and a further four between 1873 and 1874.

In 1890, the Compagnie des Mines de Bruay employed 3,600 men, 275 children and 122 women, producing 877,000 tons of coal. In 1897, production reached 1,500,000 tons with 4,580 men, 900 children and 156 women employed. By 1910, 2,500,000 tons of coal was being extracted by the company annually.

During the First World War the Germans failed to capture the Bruay shafts, despite their close proximity to the front line. Overseen by Jules Elby, the company produced 2,081,000 tons in 1914, 3,143,000 tons in 1915, 3,325,000 tons in 1916 and 4,504,000 tons in 1917. In 1918, the company employed 20,505 workers.

By 1939, the Bruary mines were producing approximately 3,161,000 tons of coal and 230,000 tons of Carbolux each year. By this stage the company had a central washhouse, a low-temperature distillation plant, a ball mill, a power station at Labuissière, 160 kilometers of railway, a shore at Bethune, 389 houses for workers and a hospital.

The Bruay Mining Company was nationalised by the French state in 1946, and coal extraction at its sites ended in the 1970s and 1980s.
