= Jules Elby =

French politician (1857–1933)

Senator for Pas-de-Calais
- In office 7 January 1923 – 2 July 1933
- Preceded by: Louis Boudenoot

Personal details
- Born: 25 November 1857
- Died: 2 July 1933 (aged 75)
- Party: Democratic Republican Alliance

Jules Désiré Elby (25 November 1857 – 2 July 1933) was a French industrialist and Democratic Republican Alliance politician who represented Pas-de-Calais in the Senate between 1923 and 1933. He was also Director-General of the Bruay Mining Company.

== Early life ==
Elby was born in Gonnelieu, Cambrésis, the son of Jules Émile Elby (a cotton weaver) and Virginie Josèphe Mignot. At the age of 18 he entered the Bruay Mining Company as a labourer.

== Career ==
Elby remained with the Bruay Mining Company for 58 years, becoming Director-General in 1899 and finally Chairman of the Board of Directors in 1924. During the First World War he was commissioned by the French Army to administer Bruay-la-Buissière and ensure that the town maintained its coal production, despite its very close proximity to the fighting on the Western Front.

His political career began in 1899, when he was elected mayor of Bruay-en-Artois. Elby was conseiller général of Houdain from 1901 to 1919. On 7 January 1923 he stood in a by-election to the Senate as the Republican candidate in Pas-de-Calais, and was elected in the first round with 1,033 votes to the Socialist candidate's 536. At the Luxembourg Palace he enrolled as a member of the Republican Union, part of the Democratic Republican Alliance. He was re-elected on 9 January 1927. During his time in the Senate he served on the Accounting Commission, the Railway Commission, in the Ministry of Transport and National Machinery, and in the Ministry of Mining. He retained his seat until his death at the age of 75 in 1933.

Elby held numerous other positions, including as a director of the Bank of France and President of the Chamber of Commerce of Bethune.

== Honours ==
Elby became Grand Officer of the Legion of Honour in 1919, having been made a knight in 1904. He was also honoured as a Grand Cross of the Order of Leopold II by Belgium (1920) and as a Commander of the Order of the British Empire by the United Kingdom (1920) for his work during the First World War. He was given an honorary Croix de Guerre.

== Family ==
He married Mathilde, the daughter of the Senator Alfred Leroy. Through marriage Elby became connected to the families of vicomte de Butler and comte du Merle. Mathilde died at the age of 38 in 1898 while undergoing an operation. Their children were subsequently sent to boarding school in England. One of their sons was the politician Henri Elby.

Elby owned numerous properties, including the Château de Remaisnil, which was held by his family until the 1950s, and the Château de Fressin.
