= Bruay-la-Buissière =

Bruay-la-Buissière Bruwaei
- Commune
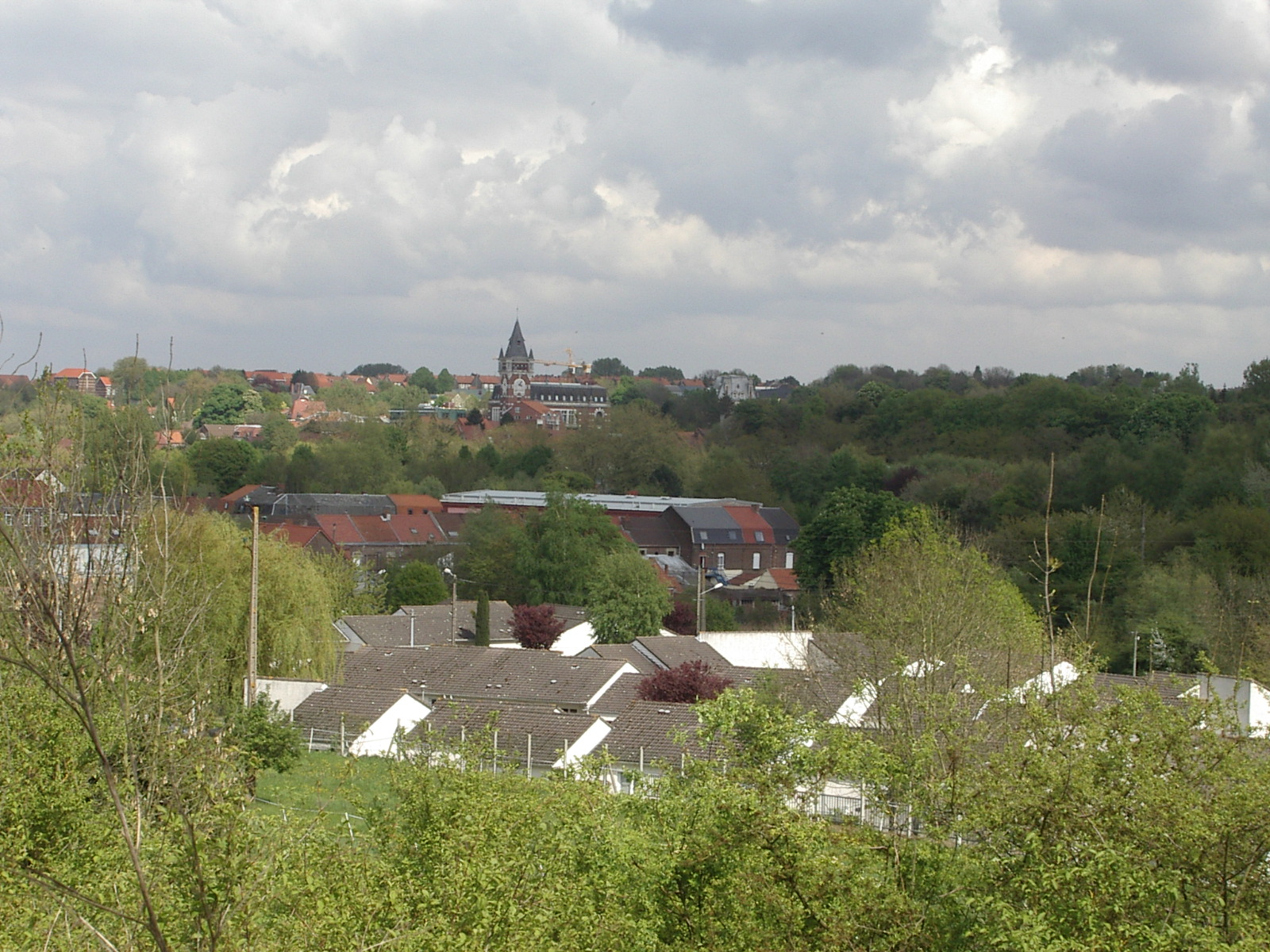
- A general view of Bruay-La-Buissière

- Coat of arms
- Location of Bruay-la-Buissière
- Location within France Location within Hauts-de-France
- Coordinates: 50°28′55″N 2°32′55″E
- Country: France
- Region: Hauts-de-France
- Department: Pas-de-Calais
- Arrondissement: Béthune
- Canton: Bruay-la-Buissière
- Intercommunality: CA Béthune-Bruay, Artois-Lys Romane

Government
  - Mayor (2020–2026): Ludovic Pajot (RN)
- Area^{1}: 16.35 km^{2} (6.31 sq mi)
- Elevation: 98 m (322 ft)
- Highest elevation: 106 m (348 ft)
- Lowest elevation: 30 m (98 ft)
- Population (2023): 21,424
  - Density: 1,310/km^{2} (3,394/sq mi)
- Time zone: UTC+01:00 (CET)
  - Summer (DST): UTC+02:00 (CEST)
- INSEE/Postal code: 62178 /62700
- ^{1} French Land Register data, which excludes lakes, ponds, glaciers > 1 km^{2} (0.386 sq mi or 247 acres) and river estuaries.

Bruay-la-Buissière (French pronunciation: [bʁyɛ la bɥisjɛʁ]; West Flemish: Bruwaei, Picard: Brouay-l'Bussière) is a commune in the Pas-de-Calais department in the Hauts-de-France region in northern France.

== Geography ==
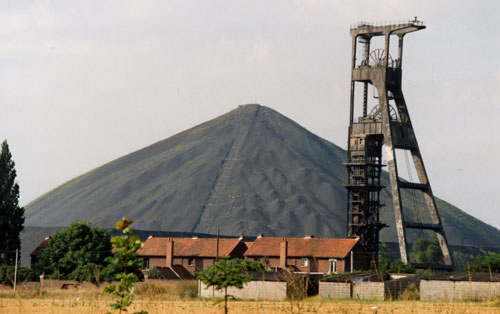
Slag heap

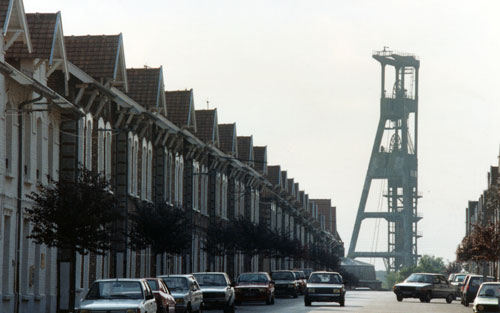
Miners' houses

It is a former coalmining town some 6 miles (9.7 km) southwest of Béthune and 30 miles (48 km) southwest of Lille, at the junction of the D57 and the N47 roads.

== History ==
With four coal mines, it was the headquarters of the Bruay Mining Company. The coal mines closed during the 1960s, to be replaced by light industrial work and chemical factories. In April 1972 the murder of miner's daughter Brigitte Dewevre became a politicized event when Pierre Leroy, a local middle-class lawyer associated with the local mining company, was arrested: La Cause du Peuple, the paper of the Maoist Gauche prolétarienne, publicized the case with the headline 'Bruay: And Now They Are Massacring Our Children!'

The two former communes of Bruay-en-Artois and Labuissière were joined as one commune in 1987.

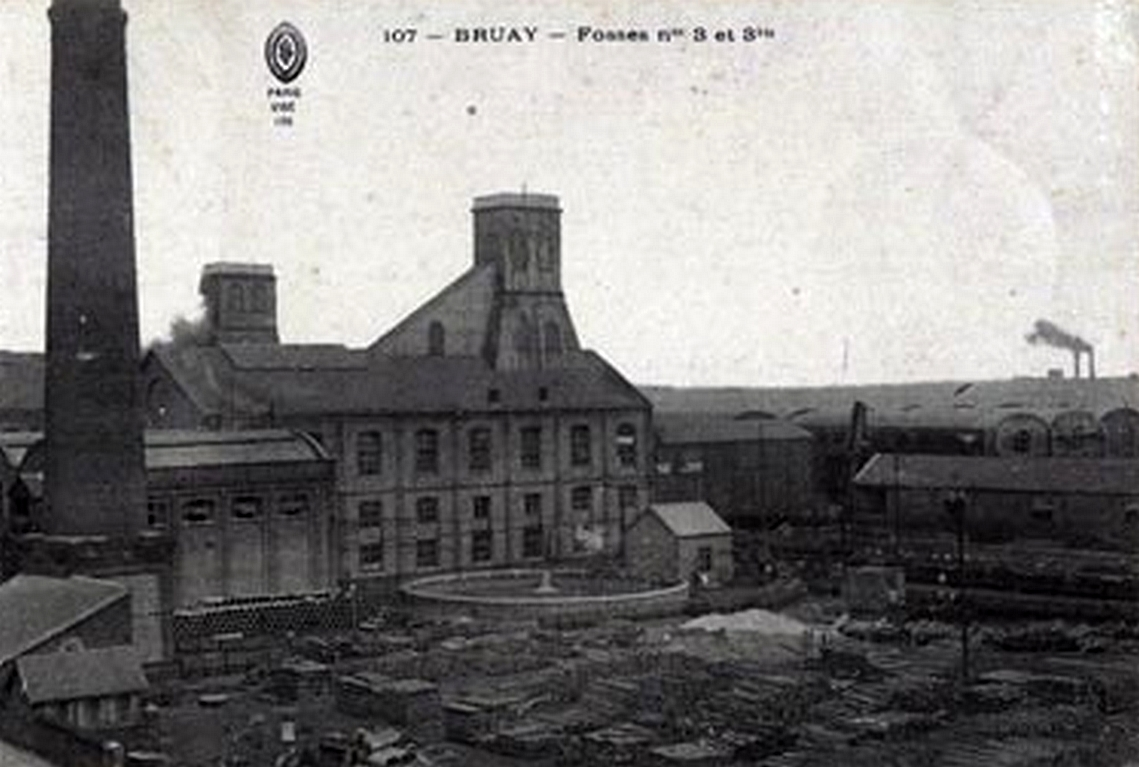
A pit head of the Compagnie des mines de Bruay

== Population ==
The population data given in the table and graph below for 1982 and earlier refer to the former commune of Bruay-en-Artois.

Historical population

Year	Pop.	±% p.a.
1793	500	—
1800	470	−0.88%
1806	592	+3.92%
1821	606	+0.16%
1831	688	+1.28%
1836	707	+0.55%
1841	711	+0.11%
1846	694	−0.48%
1851	712	+0.51%
1856	935	+5.60%
1861	1,528	+10.32%
1866	2,102	+6.59%
1872	2,316	+1.63%
1876	4,037	+14.90%
1881	5,335	+5.73%
1886	7,031	+5.68%
1891	9,647	+6.53%
1896	11,380	+3.36%
1901	14,740	+5.31%

Year	Pop.	±% p.a.
1906	16,544	+2.34%
1911	18,363	+2.11%
1921	29,710	+4.93%
1926	30,893	+0.78%
1931	31,831	+0.60%
1936	30,125	−1.10%
1946	31,705	+0.51%
1954	31,923	+0.09%
1962	30,902	−0.41%
1968	28,628	−1.27%
1975	25,714	−1.52%
1982	22,893	−1.65%
1990	24,927	+1.07%
1999	23,998	−0.42%
2007	23,804	−0.10%
2012	23,035	−0.65%
2017	21,831	−1.07%
2023	21,424	−0.31%

Source: EHESS and INSEE (1968-2023)

== Sights ==
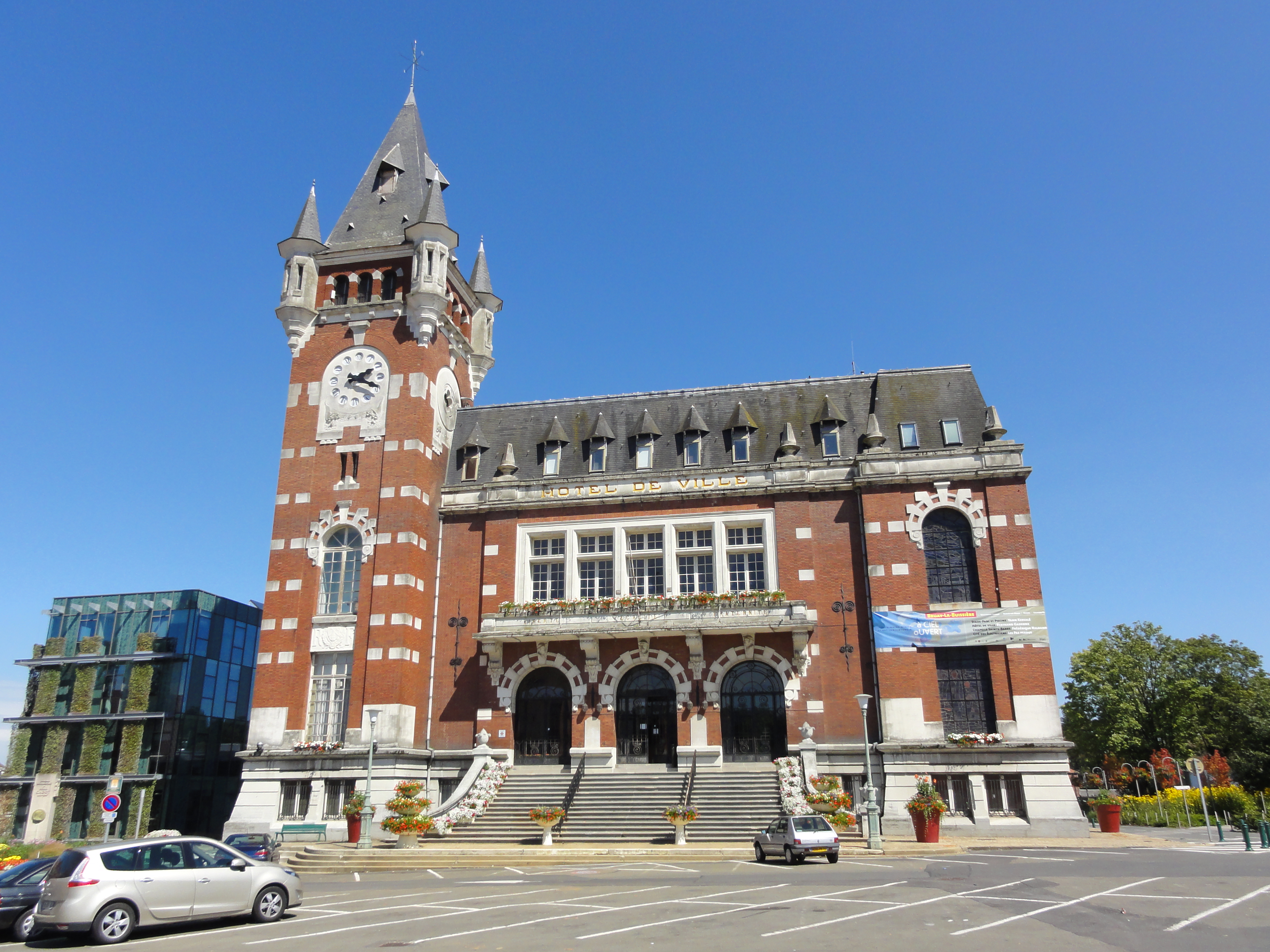
The Hôtel de Ville

- The Hôtel de Ville completed in 1931. The windows recount scenes from the lives of miners.
- The Art Deco swimming pool, built in 1936 (the last remaining Art Deco pool open to the public)
- The Museum of mining.
- The Church of Saint Martin, dating from the fifteenth century, was expanded and renovated in 1974.
- Ballencourt manor in Labuissière, was built in 1777. Partially renovated, it now hosts the music school.
- The donjon of the castle of La Buissière, built in 1310 by Mahaut, Countess of Artois.
- The church at Labuissière, presently closed to the public for renovation work.
- The Velodrome at Labuissière built by the Bruay Mining Co., in 1925.
- The Museum of calculation and Scripture. Traces the history of writing and calculating machines such as the Enigma German coding machine.

== See also ==
- Communes of the Pas-de-Calais department
