= Canton of Audruicq =

Coordinates: 50°54′21″N 2°04′32″E

Audruicq
- Former canton
- Interactive map of Audruicq
- Country: France
- Region: Hauts-de-France
- Department: Pas-de-Calais
- No. of communes: {{{nbcomm}}}
- Disbanded: 2015
- Area: 203.10 km^{2} (78.42 sq mi)
- Population (2012): 25,255
  - Density: 124.35/km^{2} (322.06/sq mi)

The canton of Audruicq is a former canton situated in the department of the Pas-de-Calais and in the Nord-Pas-de-Calais region of northern France. It was disbanded following the French canton reorganisation which came into effect in March 2015. It consisted of 13 communes, which joined the canton of Marck in 2015. It had a total of 25,255 inhabitants (2012, without double counting).

== Geography ==
The canton is organised around Audruicq in the arrondissement of Saint-Omer. The altitude varies from 0m (Oye-Plage) to 64m (Ruminghem) for an average altitude of 6m.

The canton comprised 13 communes:

- Audruicq
- Guemps
- Nortkerque
- Nouvelle-Église
- Offekerque
- Oye-Plage
- Polincove
- Ruminghem
- Saint-Folquin
- Sainte-Marie-Kerque
- Saint-Omer-Capelle
- Vieille-Église
- Zutkerque

== Population ==
Population Evolution
1962	1968	1975	1982	1990	1999
14733	15362	15552	19460	22058	23068
Census count starting from 1962 : Population without double counting

== See also ==
- Cantons of Pas-de-Calais
- Communes of Pas-de-Calais
- Arrondissements of the Pas-de-Calais department
