= French Flemish =

West Flemish dialect of northern France

- Frans-Vlams
- Native to: France
- Region: Hauts-de-France: Dunkirk, Bourbourg, Calais, Saint-Omer and Bailleul
- Native speakers: (20,000 full speakers or 50,000 with varying proficiency – 60,000) cited 1999)
- Language family: Indo-European: Germanic; West Germanic; Istvaeonic; Low Franconian; Dutch; West Flemish; French Flemish

Language codes
- ISO 639-3: –
- Glottolog: fran1265 Frans-Westhoek Vlaams
- Linguasphere: 52-ACB-agd

French Flemish (Fransch vlaemsch, Flamind franchoèse, Standard Dutch: Frans-Vlaams, French: flamand français) is a West Flemish dialect spoken in the north of contemporary France.

Place names indicate that Flemish was spoken as early as the 8th century in the region of Flanders that was ceded to France at the 1659 Treaty of the Pyrenees. This area became known as French Flanders. Its dialect subgroup, called French Flemish, meanwhile, became a minority dialect that survives mainly in Dunkirk (Duinkerke in Dutch, Duunkerke in West Flemish, "dune church"), Bourbourg (Broekburg in Dutch), Calais (Kales), Saint-Omer (Sint-Omaars), with its Flemish ethnic enclave of Haut-Pont (Haute-Ponte), and Bailleul (Belle).

French Flemish has about 20,000 daily users, and twice that number of occasional speakers. The dialect's status appears to be moribund, but there has been an active movement to retain French Flemish in the region.

== Status ==
Though generally seen as a dialect of Dutch, some of its speakers prefer to call it a regional language. Jean-Paul Couché, chairman of the Akademie voor Nuuze Vlaemsche Taele (ANVT), argues:

Linguistically, a dialect depends on a larger, national language. That does not apply to French Flemish. We are not connected to standard Dutch because it is an artificial language that was created based on the dialects of North Holland. Research shows that the distance between French Flemish and Dutch is greater than that between Dutch and German.

Although French Flemish and West Flemish are together with Limburgish the most distant dialects from Standard Dutch, Standard Dutch and Standard German are more distant still. However, that is not the case for dialects spoken at both sides of the Dutch-German border. This is partly due to the fact that those German dialects are not dialects of High German but of Low German and Low Franconian.

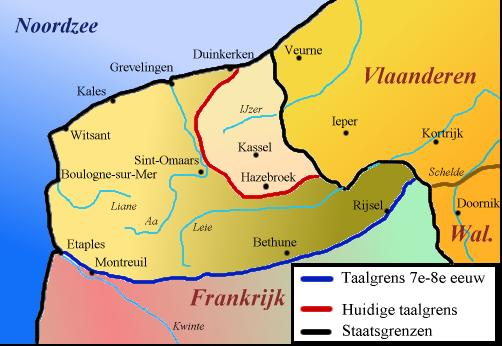
Historic regression of Dutch in the Western periphery. The blue line indicates the situation in the 7th–8th century; the red line marks the situation during the 20th century; the black line is the current French-Belgian border.

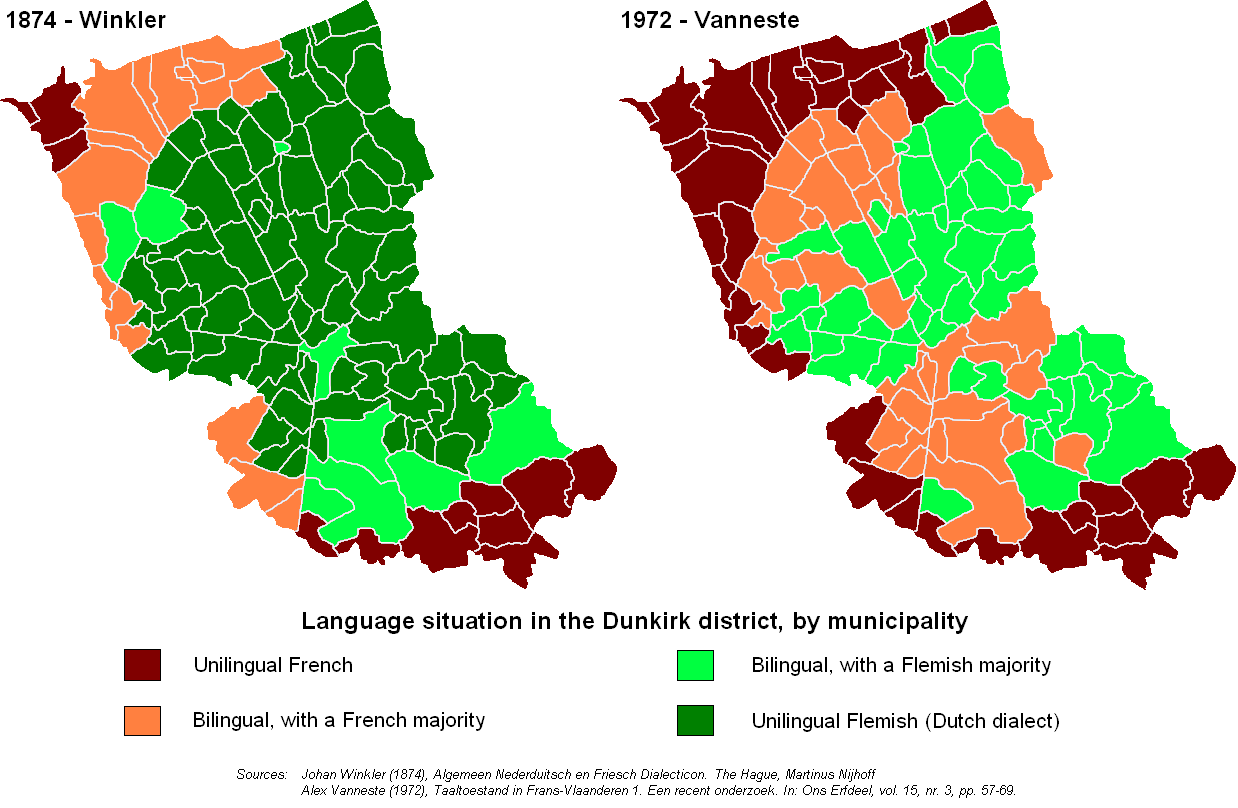
Flemish (green) and French (red/brown) as spoken in the arrondissement of Dunkirk in 1874 and 1972

== History ==
An earlier form of Flemish was once spoken in what is now metropolitan France over a much wider area than in the 21st century. This is also reflected in the toponymy of Nord-Pas-de-Calais, for instance in the name of the town of Wissant, in which the Flemish Witsant (“white sand”) can easily be recognised.

The chambers of rhetoric testify to an intellectual life in Flemish in French Flanders. These societies, created in the 15th century, organised religious festivities in towns and villages; the chamber of Eecke dates from 1542. They held competitions intended to “maintain the purity of the Flemish language in its form and pronunciation” and to promote poetry in Flemish. These competitions were public. Some chambers survived until the 19th century, and even into the 20th century in the case of the restored chamber of Eecke.

A native of French Flanders, the poet and playwright Michiel de Swaen was a 17th-century Dutch-language writer. In his plays, common people speak Flemish, whereas nobles use a written form strongly influenced by Brabantian and Hollandic.

After the French Revolution, the old Flemish chambers of rhetoric, which had been dissolved like civil and religious corporations, gradually re-established themselves in French Flanders. Louis de Backer notes the reconstitution of the chamber of rhetoric of Hondschoote on 27 Nivôse Year X of the French Republican calendar, as well as the organisation at Bergues of a poetry competition in which the chambers of rhetoric of Kortrijk, Steenvoorde, Steene, Veurne, Moorsele, Poperinge and Hondschoote took part. In the early 19th century, Flemish authors from France were still taking part in literary competitions in Diksmuide and Veurne, including Hubben from Dunkirk, Bertein and Bels from Wormhout, Van Rechem from Hazebrouck and Louis Lecomte from Bailleul.

=== 19th Century ===
The spread of French through schooling was an important factor in the decline of French Flemish in the 19th century. According to Jean-Claude Dupas, teaching in Flemish continued after the French Revolution, despite an initial attempt by the Convention to impose teaching in French. The turning point came in the 19th century, when French gradually became the normal and then exclusive language of primary education.

At the beginning of the 19th century, in the arrondissement of Dunkirk and in that of Hazebrouck, all municipalities were Flemish-speaking, with the exception of three municipalities in the arrondissement of Dunkirk that were exclusively French-speaking, namely Gravelines, Loon and Mardyck, and ten municipalities in the arrondissement of Hazebrouck that were likewise exclusively French-speaking, namely Blaringhem, Boeseghem, Thiennes, Haverskerque, Merville, La Gorgue, Estaires, Neuf-Berquin, Steenwerck and Nieppe.[12] In addition, French was also spoken in Holque and Saint-Momelin, but alongside Flemish, and in the arrondissement of Lille only the municipality of Wervicq-Sud was Flemish-speaking at that time.

According to a letter from the prefect dated 13 September 1806, out of the 671 municipalities in the Nord department, 99 were Flemish-speaking and 572 were French-speaking.[12] Also in 1806, there were reportedly 155,712 speakers of Flemish in the Nord department and 1,261 in Pas-de-Calais. In 1807, according to a letter from a sub-prefect, the inhabitants of Clairmarais, Ruminghem and the suburbs of Saint-Omer continued to speak their “corrupted Flemish”. They used it alongside French, which they practised rather than their Flemish [sic].

In 1833, the law on primary education, known as the Guizot Law, made the teaching of the elements of the French language compulsory in primary schools. Several studies devoted to French Flanders present this date as an important stage in the educational Frenchification of the region: according to Jean-Claude Dupas, it was from 1833 onwards that the State truly sought to limit the use of Flemish in schools; Hugo Ryckeboer also states that from this period onwards Flemish was gradually excluded from education, contributing to the decline of Flemish in the arrondissements of Dunkirk and Hazebrouck, where it nevertheless remained widely spoken among the popular, working-class and agricultural populations.

According to Abel Hugo, around 1835 Flemish was the usual language in the arrondissements of Hazebrouck and Dunkirk. However, all the inhabitants also knew and spoke French, a development he described as a conquest of the Revolution. Fifty years earlier, one would not have found in Flanders one farmer in twenty who could express himself in any language other than his mother tongue.

In 1845, in Pas-de-Calais, the localities of Clairmarais, Saint-Folquin, Le Haut-Pont, Saint-Omer-Cappelle, Oye, Ruminghem and Vieille-Église were places where Flemish was still spoken.

In January 1853, the Academic Council of the Nord department adopted a specific decision concerning the use of Flemish in schools in the arrondissements of Dunkirk and Hazebrouck. Teachers were authorised to teach reading in Flemish alongside reading in French, but only so that children whose mother tongue was Flemish could learn their catechism and prepare for First Communion. All other exercises, however, had to take place in French, and the teacher was required to speak French and not tolerate the use of any other language in the school. This decision, sometimes presented as a ban on Flemish in schools, therefore did not abolish all educational use of the language, but confined it to a religious and transitional function. It formed part of the broader movement of educational Frenchification in the 19th century, at a time when Flemish was still widely used among the popular, working-class and agricultural populations of French Flanders.

In the second half of the 19th century, scholarly defence of French Flemish was organised around local scholars and learned societies. Louis de Backer published several works devoted to the Flemings of France and their language, while the Comité flamand de France, founded in 1853, set itself the task, among others, of studying the language and literature of the Flemings of France.

The Historical Commission of the Nord department in 1845, and the Comité flamand de France in a more complete manner in 1857, recorded the linguistic situation in northern France. It emerged that, out of the 59 municipalities making up the arrondissement of Dunkirk, 40 spoke exclusively Flemish, 2 exclusively French, 5 Flemish and French with Flemish dominant, and 13 French and Flemish with French dominant.

Before their definitive incorporation into France, the inhabitants of the arrondissement of Dunkirk spoke only Flemish. This situation had not changed substantially by 1862. A significant part of the population knew French in 1862, but the majority of the inhabitants, especially those belonging to the working and agricultural classes, continued to speak Flemish at that time.

Around 1863, the language spoken by the inhabitants of the arrondissement of Hazebrouck, especially by the working and agricultural classes, was Flemish. According to a statistical study drawn up in 1857, out of the 53 municipalities making up the arrondissement, 31 spoke exclusively Flemish, 8 exclusively French, 11 Flemish and French with Flemish dominant, and 3 French and Flemish with French dominant.

According to De Backer, the disappearance of the last generations of the 19th century nevertheless marked the decline of Flemish as a written language in France. The language then survived more in oral, popular and festive uses. He notably mentions Tisje-Tasje of Noordpeene, a figure of cabaret and Flemish popular culture who became one of the emblematic giants of Hazebrouck, as well as Verlyck of Hazebrouck, who is said to have enlivened the fairs and kermesses of the region for more than half a century with his jokes, songs and comic dialogues with a puppet named Kô Poulle, which became legendary.

=== 20th Century ===
A 1911 census revealed that 75% of the market gardeners of Saint-Omer spoke West Flemish.

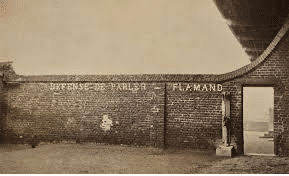
"Speaking Flemish is forbidden" written on a brick wall

At the turn of the 19th and 20th centuries, the decline of French Flemish formed part of a broader context of educational and administrative Francization. In schools, the use of Flemish was gradually associated with a popular, rural or archaic speech form, in contrast to French, which was presented as the language of education, social advancement and national unity. Testimonies report punishments imposed on pupils caught speaking Flemish, including the use of the “symbol” or signum: the child at fault was given an object, which he or she could pass on to another pupil by denouncing them in turn; whoever still had the object at the end of the day was punished. Other accounts mention humiliations, such as rinsing the mouth with cold water, intended to wash away the “bad” Flemish words. Inscriptions such as “Défense de parler flamand” (“Speaking Flemish forbidden”) or “Il est interdit de parler flamand et d’uriner sur les murs” (“It is forbidden to speak Flemish and to urinate on the walls”) are regularly cited as traces of this educational and social stigmatization.

In French Flanders, this linguistic pressure was combined with the conflict between republican schooling and Catholic circles. After the law of 9 December 1905 concerning the separation of the Churches and the State, the defence of Flemish could become, in some clerical or Catholic circles, a way of resisting republican secularization. The local language retained a religious and communal function: it continued to be used in families, in some parish contexts, in local relations and in rural areas. Conversely, for some republican authorities, Flemish appeared as one of the signs of a rural, Catholic and peripheral world that had to be more firmly integrated into the French nation through school, administration and military service.

The crisis over the inventories of Church property in 1906 gave this opposition a national dimension. On 6 March 1906, in Boeschèpe, an inventory operation concerning Church property led to clashes; Géry Ghysel, a village butcher, was killed. This episode was one of the two deaths recorded nationally during the quarrel over the inventories and caused considerable political emotion, contributing to the fall of the Rouvier government. In Flanders, the crisis reinforced the association between rural Catholicism, resistance to the central State and attachment to local customs, of which the Flemish language was part. It did not by itself cause the decline of Flemish, but it hardened the ideological climate in which the language was perceived.

In the years preceding the First World War, this religious tension was compounded by growing hostility towards anything that could be associated with the Germanic world. After the loss of Alsace-Lorraine in 1871, and then in the context of Franco-German rivalry, West Flemish in France occupied an ambiguous position: it was the traditional language of a French population, but it nevertheless belonged to the continuum of Germanic languages. This situation encouraged its symbolic marginalization. In some discourses, speaking Flemish could be perceived not only as a sign of social backwardness, but also as a foreign or suspect survival in a Republic that increasingly valued linguistic unity. This double stigmatization, both educational and national, helps explain why many parents, especially after the First and then the Second World War, chose to transmit French to their children rather than Flemish.

In the 1970s, French Flemish also benefited from the folk revival and from growing interest in regional cultures. Traditional song and dance became means of promoting the Flemish linguistic heritage. Christian-Pierre Ghillebaert notably cites, among the first folk groups to emerge from this revival, Joël et Klerktje and Haeghedoorn, and, for a more recent period, Het Reuzekoor and Edmonde Vanhille. Haeghedoorn, a group active in the repertoire of French Flanders, was the subject of a 1980 television report produced by France Régions 3 Lille and preserved by the INA, in which it was presented as a group perpetuating the Flemish tradition in popular festivals and cafés of inland Flanders. Its recordings, later included in a compilation, cover pieces recorded between 1975 and 1993; several traditional titles are indicated as coming from the collections of Edmond de Coussemaker, with arrangements by the group. In the same movement, Marieke en Bart also defended a repertoire sung in the Flemish of the Westhoek, notably based on the popular songs collected in the 19th century by Edmond de Coussemaker.

In 1972, Alex Vanneste carried out a new study of the linguistic situation in the Dunkirk arrondissement.[34] It showed that the French language had gained ground compared with 1874, since all the formerly bilingual municipalities with a French-speaking majority had become monolingual French-speaking.

In 1978, Radio Uylenspiegel was created in Cassel, first as a pirate radio station and then on FM in 1982, with the aim of promoting the Flemish language and culture. In 2002, 10% of its broadcasts were in Flemish. In addition, three regional journals, namely Platch’iou (1981–2000), Revue de l’Houtland (1979–2001) and Yser houck (since 1989), regularly devoted articles to various aspects of Flemish in France and included texts in regional Flemish or in Dutch.

According to the INSEE survey conducted in conjunction with the 1999 census, the Flemish language, concerning approximately 60,000 speakers over the age of 18, was mainly reported by the oldest generations. The proportion of speakers was divided by 13.3 for Flemish between people aged over 60 and those under 25. The language retention rate for Flemish, defined as the proportion of adults who had heard their parents speak Flemish and who themselves used it, even only occasionally, was around one third (33%); this proportion reached 42% among farmers. The figure of 33% as a retention rate implies only 11% retention after two generations, that is, after roughly 60 years. Among Flemish speakers, slightly more than half belonged to the categories of workers and employees, and 11% were farmers.

=== 21st Century ===
At the beginning of the 21st century, French Flemish is scarcely spoken outside the arrondissement of Dunkirk, extending as far as Armentières, west of Lille, the “capital of Flanders”, which itself has never been Flemish-speaking. In the 1980s and 1990s, thanks to the work of the association Tegaere Toegaen, French Flemish was taught in several secondary schools, either as a third modern language under the title “Flemish regional language and culture” or in school clubs, as well as in a few primary schools. In the 1990s, a “Flemish option” was also offered at the teacher-training college. Since the mid-2000s, at the request of the Institut de la langue régionale flamande, Flemish has once again been taught in a few primary schools as part of an experimental programme.

The institutional situation has recently evolved with the inclusion of West Flemish among the regional languages that may be taught within the French national education system. The circular of 16 December 2021 on the teaching of regional modern languages explicitly mentions West Flemish among the languages concerned, alongside Picard, Basque, Breton, Catalan, Corsican and Occitan, among others.

New prospects for the “rescue” of French Flemish opened with the Public Office for West Flemish, whose creation was approved on 27 March 2018 by the standing committee of the Hauts-de-France Regional Council. This office is the fifth of its kind in France, after those for the Basque language[43] (a public interest grouping created in 2004), the Breton language (a public cultural cooperation establishment created in 2010), the Occitan language (a public cultural cooperation establishment created in 2015) and the Catalan language (a public interest grouping created in 2016).

The preservation of French Flemish also involves audiovisual collections of native speakers. Mark Ingelaere has for several years documented French Flemish through his YouTube channel Streektaal, recording conversations with speakers still able to speak vlaemsch; according to Les Plats Pays, he had already filmed more than 460 speakers by 2024. This work constitutes a form of heritage collection at a time when family transmission of the language has become very weak.

In French Flanders, Flemish references today enjoy renewed symbolic and commercial visibility, including shop signs, café names, regional products, bilingual signs, flags and cultural events, even as the active use of West Flemish continues to decline sharply. The language survives mainly among elderly people, often in rural areas, while younger generations frequently retain only passive knowledge, a few words or expressions, or affective markers of local identity.

Recent initiatives, such as the free app Lingue Vive, developed with the support of the Institut de la langue régionale flamande, aim to familiarise children with West Flemish vocabulary, as part of a process of transmission and preservation rather than a return to widespread social use.

== Education ==
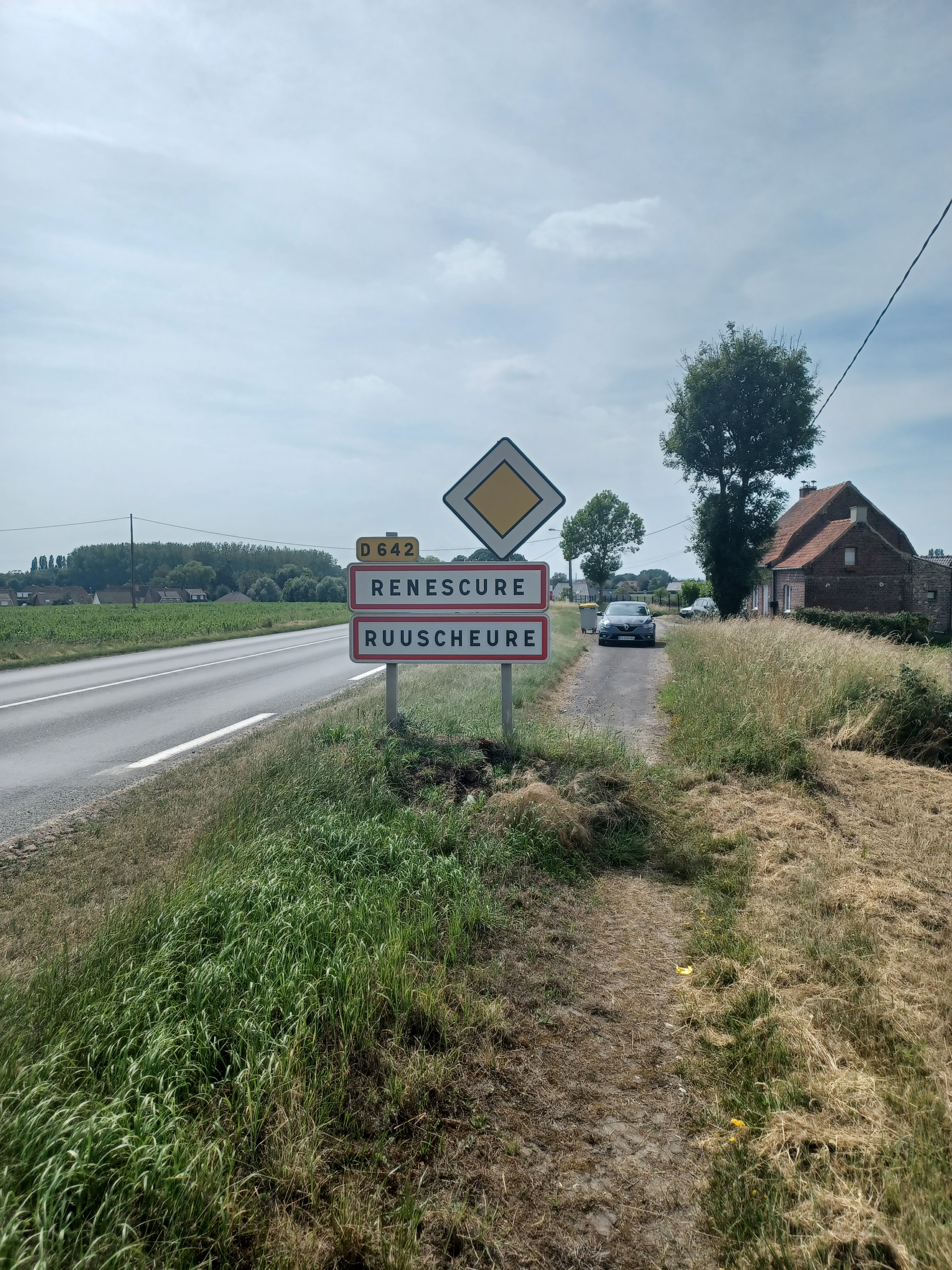
Bilingual sign at the entrance to the village of Renescure (between Saint-Omer and Hazebrouck)

A growing, re-introduced language, French Flemish is taught in several schools in the French Westhoek. The ANVT-ILRF was given permission to carry out experimental lessons in four public schools (in Esquelbecq, Noordpeene, Volckerinckhove, Wormhout) for the school years of 2007–08 until 2010–11, after which it would be evaluated. Afterwards, all requirements were met but it was only allowed to continue them, but not to expand to other schools or to the collège. On the other hand, the private Catholic education began teaching standard Dutch in collèges in Gravelines and Hondschoote.

== See also ==
- Burgundian Netherlands
- French Flanders
- French Netherlands
- Isogloss
- Nord-Pas de Calais
- Seventeen Provinces
