= Nykirken (disambiguation) =

Nykirken is a church in the city of Bergen in Vestland county, Norway.

Nykirken, Nykirke, or Ny Kirke (lit. "new church") may also refer to:

== Churches ==
- Ny Kirke, a church in the village of Nyker, on the island of Bornholm, Denmark
- Nykirken, also known as the Vestre Gausdal Church, a church in Gausdal municipality in Innlandet county, Norway
- Nykirke Church (Vestfold), a church in the village of Nykirke in Horten municipality in Vestfold county, Norway
- Nykirke (Innlandet), a church in Gjøvik municipality in Innlandet county, Norway
- Nykirke Church (Buskerud), a church in Modum municipality in Buskerud county, Norway

== Villages ==
- Nykirke, a village in Horten municipality, Vestfold county, Norway

== See also ==
- New Church (disambiguation)
