= Eski Mosque =

Eski Mosque or Old Mosque (Turkish: Eski Camii, meaning "Old Mosque"), can refer to a number of mosques across the former Ottoman Empire:

Bulgaria

- Eski Mosque, Yambol, Bulgaria

Greece

- Church of the Acheiropoietos in Thessaloniki, known in Ottoman times as Eski Mosque
- Eski Mosque, Komotini

North Macedonia

- Eski Mosque, Kumanovo

Turkey

- Eski Mosque, Adana, now Yağ Camii
- Old Mosque, Edirne
- Old Mosque, Mersin
- Old Mosque, Tarsus

== See also ==
- Eski Imaret Mosque, Istanbul, Turkey
- Purani Mosque (lit. 'Old Mosque'), Ghazipur, Uttar Pradesh, India
- Yeni Mosque (disambiguation)
