= Çarşı =

Çarşı (Ottoman Turkish: Çarşu) is a Turkish word meaning bazaar (or rather, an open market area), and may refer to:

- Çarşı (supporter group)
- Çarşı, Beşiktaş, the old center of the municipality of Beşiktaş
- Çarşı (Istanbul Metro)
- Çarşı Hamam, Mytilene
- Çarşı (Tram İzmir)
