= New Temple =

New Temple may refer to:

- Temple Church, Anglican church in London, England
- Third Temple, proposals to rebuild the Temple in Jerusalem on Temple Mount
- Naya Mandir (lit. 'New Temple'), Jain temple in Old Delhi, India

== See also ==
- New Church (disambiguation)
- Yeni Mosque (disambiguation)
- New Synagogue (disambiguation)
