= Château de Oye =

Castle in Oye-Plage, Pas-de-Calais, France

Château de Oye was a castle in Oye-Plage, Pas-de-Calais, France.

== History ==
A fort was built in 1348 by the French as a result of the English capturing Calais in 1347. The fort was progressively constructed into a castle. It was handed over to the English as part of the Treaty of Brétigny in 1360.

The castle was subject of sieges by the Count of Flanders and later by the Duke of Bourgogne. François, Duke of Guise captured the castle in 1558 and ordered its destruction.
