= Yeni Mosque =

Yeni Mosque (from Turkish: Yeni Cami) or New Mosque can refer to:

- New Mosque, Istanbul, Turkey
- New Mosque, Bitola, North Macedonia
- New Mosque, Malatya, Turkey
- Djamaa el Djedid ('New Mosque') in Algiers, Algeria
- Yeni Mosque, Edessa, Greece
- Yeni Mosque, Komotini, Greece
- Yeni Mosque, Larissa, Greece
- Yeni Mosque, Mytilene, Greece
- Yeni Mosque, Thessaloniki, Greece
- Yeni Jami, Nicosia, Cyprus

== See also ==
- Old Mosque (disambiguation)
- New Temple (disambiguation)
