= Charshi Hamam, Mytilene =

Coordinates: 39°06′37.5″N 26°33′25.7″E

Çarşı Hamam
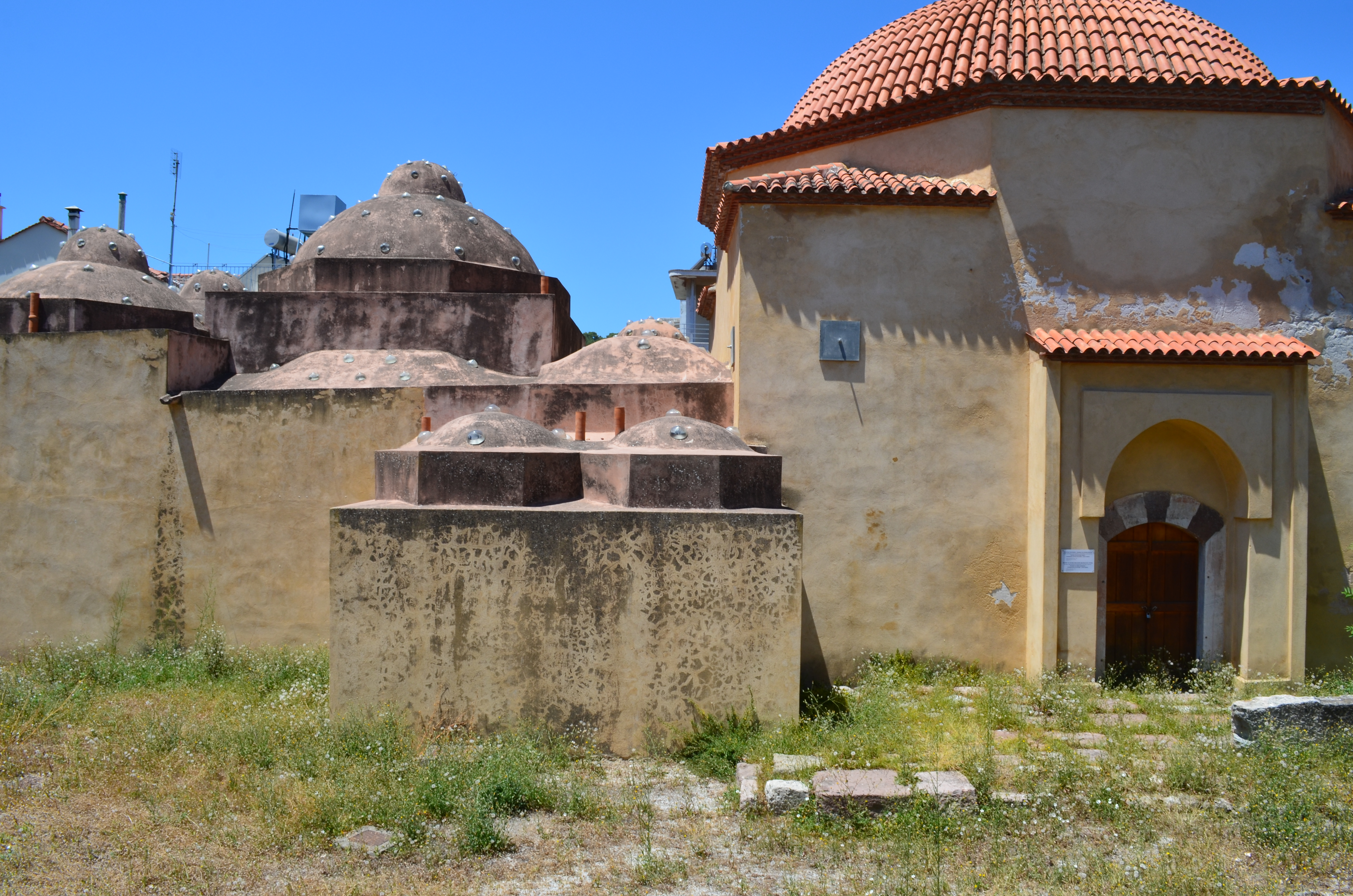
- Interactive map of the Çarşı Hamam area

General information
- Status: Completed
- Type: Hamam
- Location: Mytilene, Greece
- Completed: 19th century

The Çarşı Hamam (Greek: Τσαρσί Χαμάμ, in Turkish meaning "market bath") is an Ottoman bath (hamam) in the town of Mytilene in Lesbos, Greece.

It was probably built in the first quarter of the 19th century, and formed part of the nearby Yeni ("New") Mosque complex. As its name indicates, it was the main market bath for the local neighbourhood. Its layout follows the typical three-part procession from cold to warm found in Ottoman and Roman baths. The bath underwent a restoration in 2000–2001 and is open to the public for visits.
