= Communauté de communes de la Région d'Audruicq =

Federation of municipalities in Hauts-de-France, France

Coordinates: 50.88°N 2.08°E

Région d'Audruicq
- Communauté de communes
- Location of Région d'Audruicq within the department
- Country: France
- Region: Hauts-de-France
- Department: Pas-de-Calais
- No. of communes: {{{nbcomm}}}
- Established: 1994

Government
  - President: Nicole Chevalier
- Area: 220.0 km^{2} (84.9 sq mi)
- Population (2018): 27,630
  - Density: 125.6/km^{2} (325.3/sq mi)
- Website: www.ccra.fr

The Communauté de communes de la Région d'Audruicq is a communauté de communes, an intercommunal structure, centred on the town of Audruicq. It is located in the Pas-de-Calais department, in the Hauts-de-France region, northern France. It was created on 1 January 1994. Its seat is in Audruicq. Its area is 220.0 km^{2}. Its population was 27,630 in 2018, of which 5,422 in Audruicq proper.

== Composition ==
The communauté de communes consists of the following 15 communes:

1. Audruicq
2. Guemps
3. Muncq-Nieurlet
4. Nortkerque
5. Nouvelle-Église
6. Offekerque
7. Oye-Plage
8. Polincove
9. Recques-sur-Hem
10. Ruminghem
11. Sainte-Marie-Kerque
12. Saint-Folquin
13. Saint-Omer-Capelle
14. Vieille-Église
15. Zutkerque
