= Muncq-Nieurlet =

- Commune
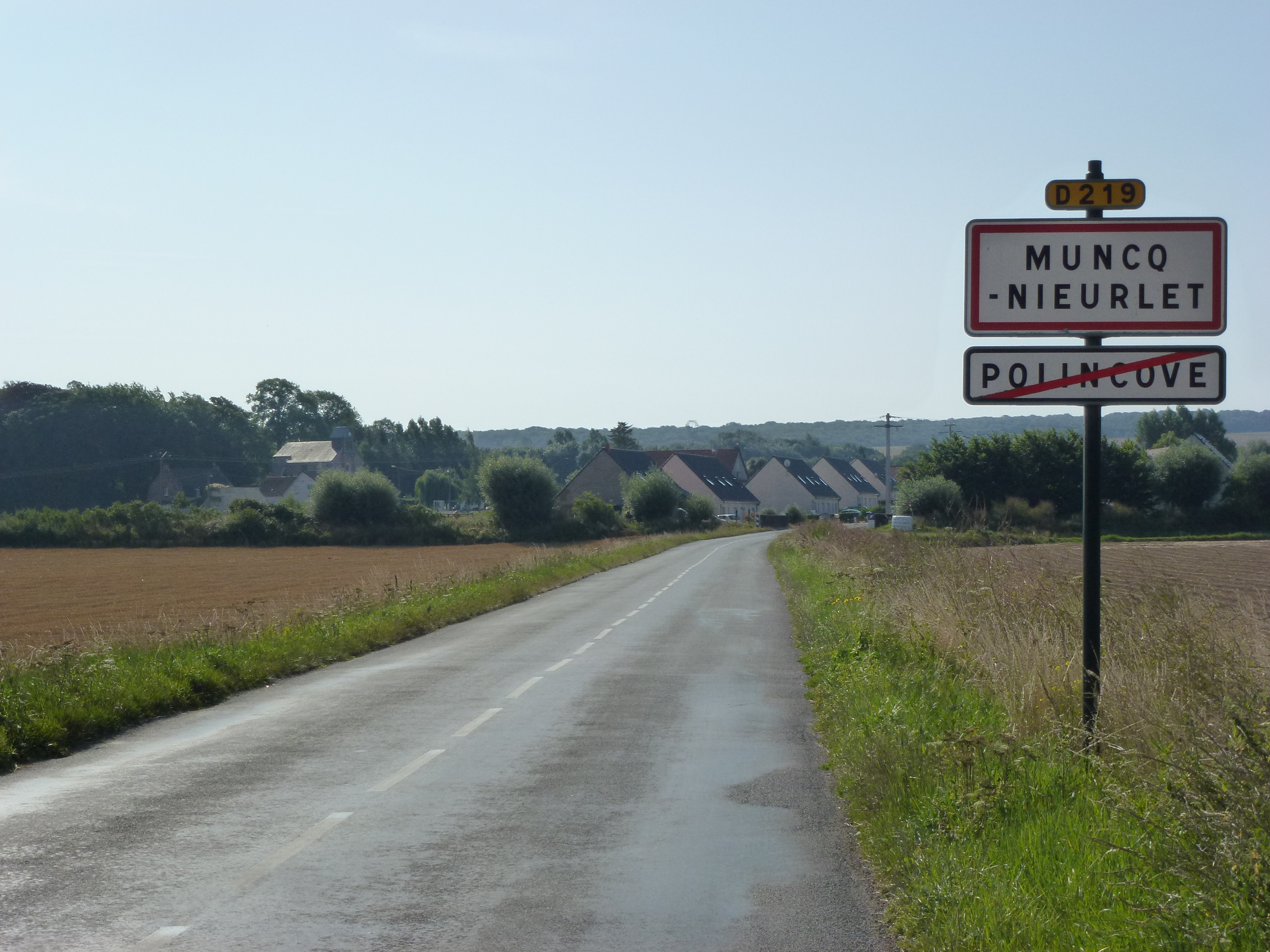
- The road into Muncq-Nieurlet

- Coat of arms
- Location of Muncq-Nieurlet
- Location within France Location within Hauts-de-France
- Coordinates: 50°50′56″N 2°06′57″E
- Country: France
- Region: Hauts-de-France
- Department: Pas-de-Calais
- Arrondissement: Calais
- Canton: Marck
- Intercommunality: CC Région d'Audruicq

Government
  - Mayor (2020–2026): Eric Biat
- Area^{1}: 11.44 km^{2} (4.42 sq mi)
- Elevation: 52 m (171 ft)
- Highest elevation: 97 m (318 ft)
- Lowest elevation: 1 m (3.3 ft)
- Population (2023): 673
  - Density: 58.8/km^{2} (152/sq mi)
- Time zone: UTC+01:00 (CET)
  - Summer (DST): UTC+02:00 (CEST)
- INSEE/Postal code: 62598 /62890
- ^{1} French Land Register data, which excludes lakes, ponds, glaciers > 1 km^{2} (0.386 sq mi or 247 acres) and river estuaries.

Muncq-Nieurlet (French pronunciation: [mœ̃k njœʁlɛ]; Dutch: Munk-Nieuwerleet) is a commune in the Pas-de-Calais department in the Hauts-de-France region of France.

== Geography ==
Munczq-Nieurlet lies about 9 miles (14 km) northwest of Saint-Omer, at the D217 and D219 crossroads.

== Population ==
Historical population
Year	Pop.	±% p.a.
1968	326	—
1975	314	−0.53%
1982	357	+1.85%
1990	451	+2.96%
1999	454	+0.07%
2007	614	+3.85%
2012	714	+3.06%
2017	734	+0.55%
2023	673	−1.44%
Source: INSEE

== Places of interest ==
- The church of St. Joseph, dating from the nineteenth century.

== See also ==
- Communes of the Pas-de-Calais department
