= Nortkerque =

Nortkerque Noordkerke
- Commune
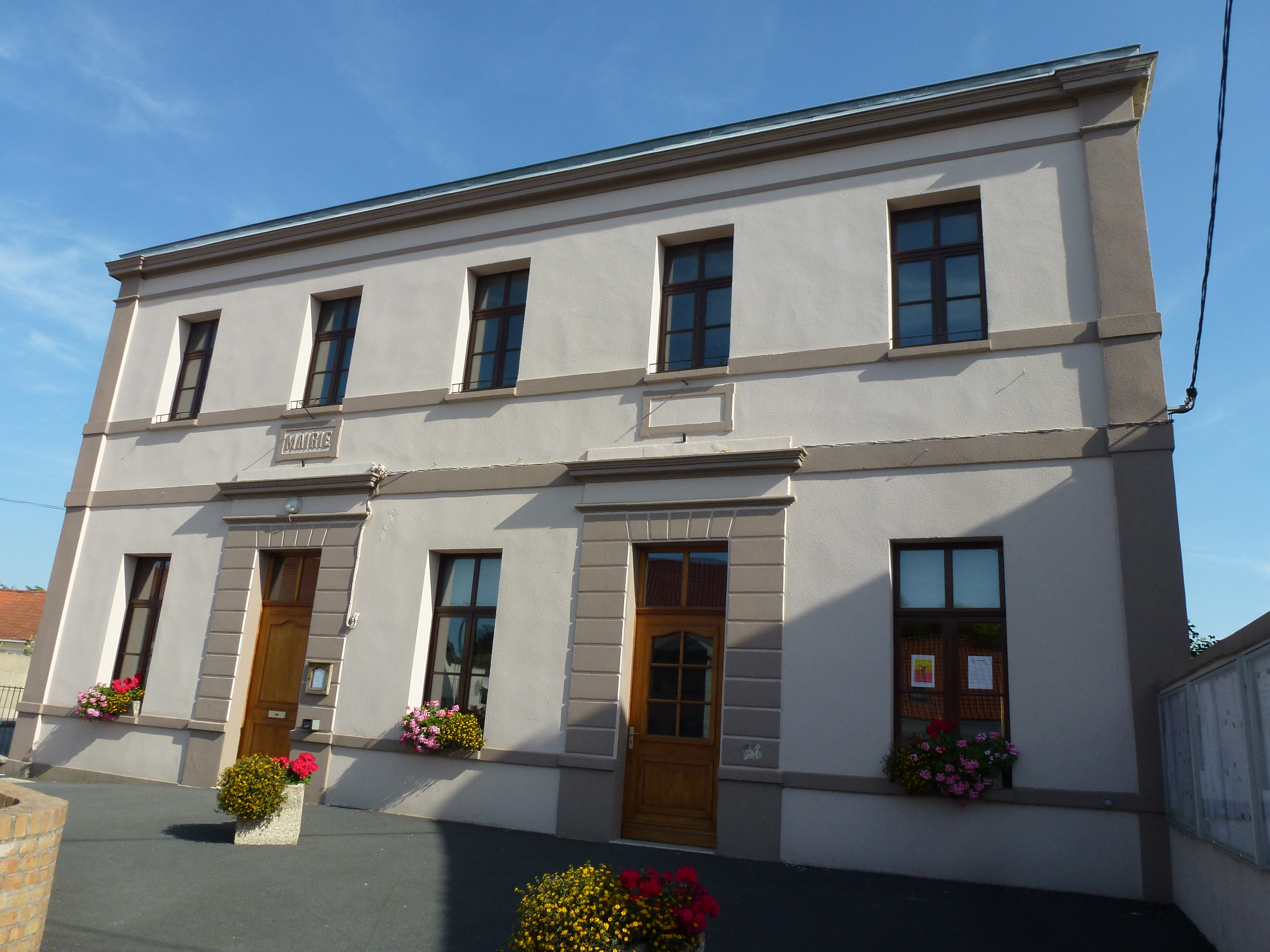
- The town hall of Nortkerque
- Location of Nortkerque
- Location within France Location within Hauts-de-France
- Coordinates: 50°52′33″N 2°01′33″E
- Country: France
- Region: Hauts-de-France
- Department: Pas-de-Calais
- Arrondissement: Calais
- Canton: Marck
- Intercommunality: CC Région d'Audruicq

Government
  - Mayor (2020–2026): Frédéric Melchior
- Area^{1}: 13.19 km^{2} (5.09 sq mi)
- Elevation: 13 m (43 ft)
- Highest elevation: 25 m (82 ft)
- Lowest elevation: 3 m (9.8 ft)
- Population (2023): 1,756
  - Density: 133.1/km^{2} (344.8/sq mi)
- Time zone: UTC+01:00 (CET)
  - Summer (DST): UTC+02:00 (CEST)
- INSEE/Postal code: 62621 /62370
- ^{1} French Land Register data, which excludes lakes, ponds, glaciers > 1 km^{2} (0.386 sq mi or 247 acres) and river estuaries.

Nortkerque (French pronunciation: [nɔʁ(t)kɛʁk]; West Flemish: Noordkerke) is a commune in the Pas-de-Calais department in the Hauts-de-France region of France.

Its name comes from Dutch and means "North church" (compare nearby Zutkerque).

== Geography ==
Nortkerque 15 miles (24 km) northwest of Saint-Omer, at the junction of the D224 and the D226 roads, half a mile from the A26 autoroute.

== Population ==
Historical population
Year	Pop.	±% p.a.
1968	1,010	—
1975	1,051	+0.57%
1982	1,355	+3.70%
1990	1,539	+1.60%
1999	1,583	+0.31%
2007	1,619	+0.28%
2012	1,627	+0.10%
2017	1,613	−0.17%
2023	1,756	+1.43%
Source: INSEE

== Places of interest ==
- The church of St. Martin, dating from the eighteenth century.
- Two chateaux.
- A ‘Triumphal arch’, near the cemetery.

== See also ==
- Communes of the Pas-de-Calais department
