= Recques-sur-Hem =

Recques-sur-Hem Rekke aan de Hem
- Commune
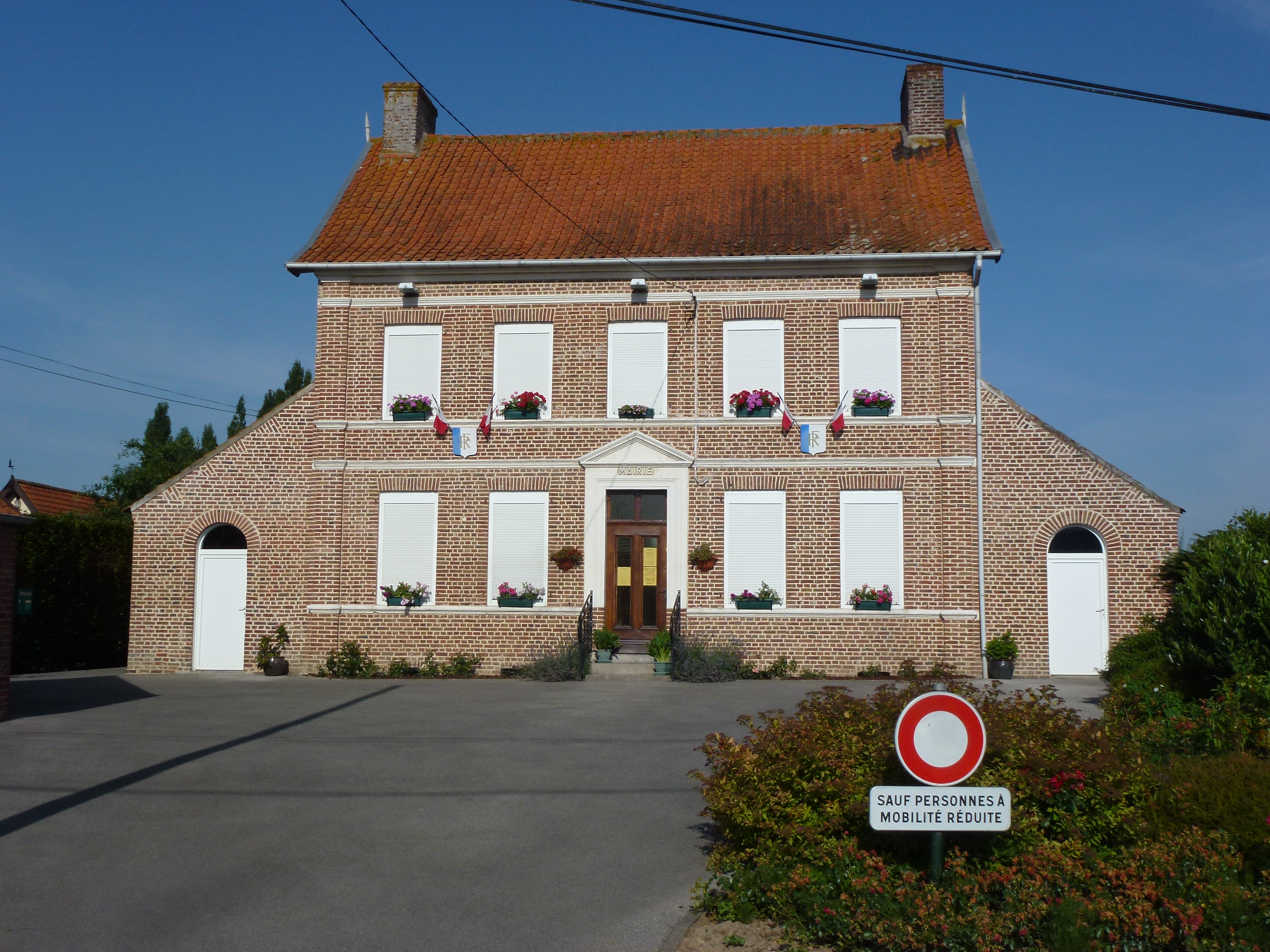
- The town hall of Recques-sur-Hem

- Coat of arms
- Location of Recques-sur-Hem
- Location within France Location within Hauts-de-France
- Coordinates: 50°50′09″N 2°05′24″E
- Country: France
- Region: Hauts-de-France
- Department: Pas-de-Calais
- Arrondissement: Calais
- Canton: Marck
- Intercommunality: CC Région d'Audruicq

Government
  - Mayor (2020–2026): Gérard Louguet
- Area^{1}: 5.41 km^{2} (2.09 sq mi)
- Elevation: 18 m (59 ft)
- Highest elevation: 46 m (151 ft)
- Lowest elevation: 3 m (9.8 ft)
- Population (2023): 675
  - Density: 125/km^{2} (323/sq mi)
- Time zone: UTC+01:00 (CET)
  - Summer (DST): UTC+02:00 (CEST)
- INSEE/Postal code: 62699 /62890
- ^{1} French Land Register data, which excludes lakes, ponds, glaciers > 1 km^{2} (0.386 sq mi or 247 acres) and river estuaries.

Recques-sur-Hem (French pronunciation: [ʁɛk syʁ ɛm], lit. 'Recques on Hem'; West Flemish: Rekke aan de Hem) is a commune in the Pas-de-Calais department in the Hauts-de-France region of France, 10 miles (16 km) northwest of Saint-Omer by the banks of the river Hem.

== Population ==
Historical population
Year	Pop.	±% p.a.
1968	359	—
1975	325	−1.41%
1982	355	+1.27%
1990	409	+1.79%
1999	504	+2.35%
2007	595	+2.10%
2012	597	+0.07%
2017	631	+1.11%
2023	675	+1.13%
Source: INSEE

== See also ==
- Communes of the Pas-de-Calais department
