= Nykirke Church (Buskerud) =

Church in Buskerud, Norway

- Nykirke kirke
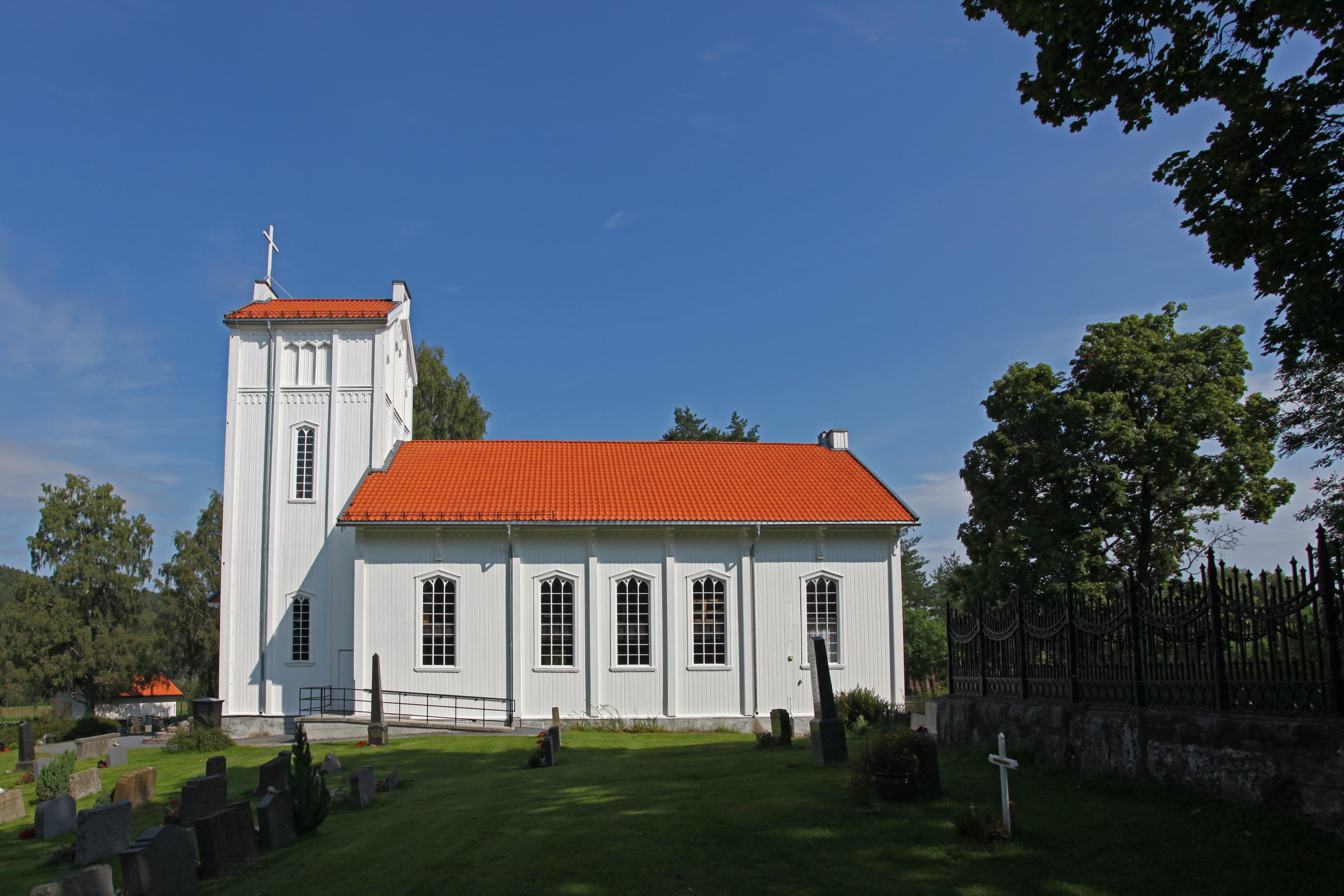
- View of the church
- Nykirke Church
- 59°53′14″N 9°52′47″E
- Location: Modum Municipality, Buskerud
- Country: Norway
- Denomination: Church of Norway
- Previous denomination: Catholic Church
- Churchmanship: Evangelical Lutheran

History
- Status: Parish church
- Founded: 14th century
- Consecrated: 3 Nov 1847

Architecture
- Functional status: Active
- Architect: Christian H. Grosch
- Architectural type: Long church
- Completed: 1847 (179 years ago)

Specifications
- Capacity: 307
- Materials: Wood

Administration
- Diocese: Tunsberg
- Deanery: Eiker prosti
- Parish: Modum
- Norwegian Cultural Heritage Site
- Type: Church
- Status: Automatically protected
- ID: 85185

Nykirke Church (Norwegian: Nykirke kirke) is a parish church of the Church of Norway in Modum Municipality in Buskerud county, Norway. It is located in the village of Nyhus. It is one of the churches for the Modum parish which is part of the Eiker prosti (deanery) in the Diocese of Tunsberg. The white, wooden church was built in a long church design in 1847 using plans drawn up by the architect Christian Heinrich Grosch. The church seats about 307 people.

== History ==
The earliest existing historical records of the church date back to the year 1331, but the church was not built that year. The first church here was probably built in the early 14th century. It was a stave church that was built on the grounds of the old Biskupsrud farm (later spelled Buskerud), which was then a bishop's estate. The farm Buskerud came into private ownership in 1668, and it is said that the church was included in the purchase. During the 1600s, the old stave church was gradually replaced by a new log building. In 1663 the old choir was demolished, and three new transepts were built, resulting in a cruciform church with a new choir in the eastern transept. The nave of the old stave church formed the western transept. In 1672, a sacristy was built next to the choir. In 1692 the western transept (the only remaining part of the old stave church) was torn down and replaced with new construction.

The owner of this church also bought the parish's two other churches (Heggen Church and Snarum Church) at the auction for the Norwegian church sale in 1723 to help the King pay off war debts. In 1828 the owner of the church got in trouble for neglecting maintenance on all the churches he owned, so the churches were taken away from him and given to the local residents. After the congregation took over the ownership of the church, the condition of the church was not in great shape. They tried to make some repairs, but by the 1840s, it was decided to replace the old building. A new timber-framed long church was designed by Christian H. Grosch it was built under the leadership of Anders Olsen. Construction begain in 1846 when the old church was demolished. The new church was consecrated on 3 November 1847.

== Media gallery ==

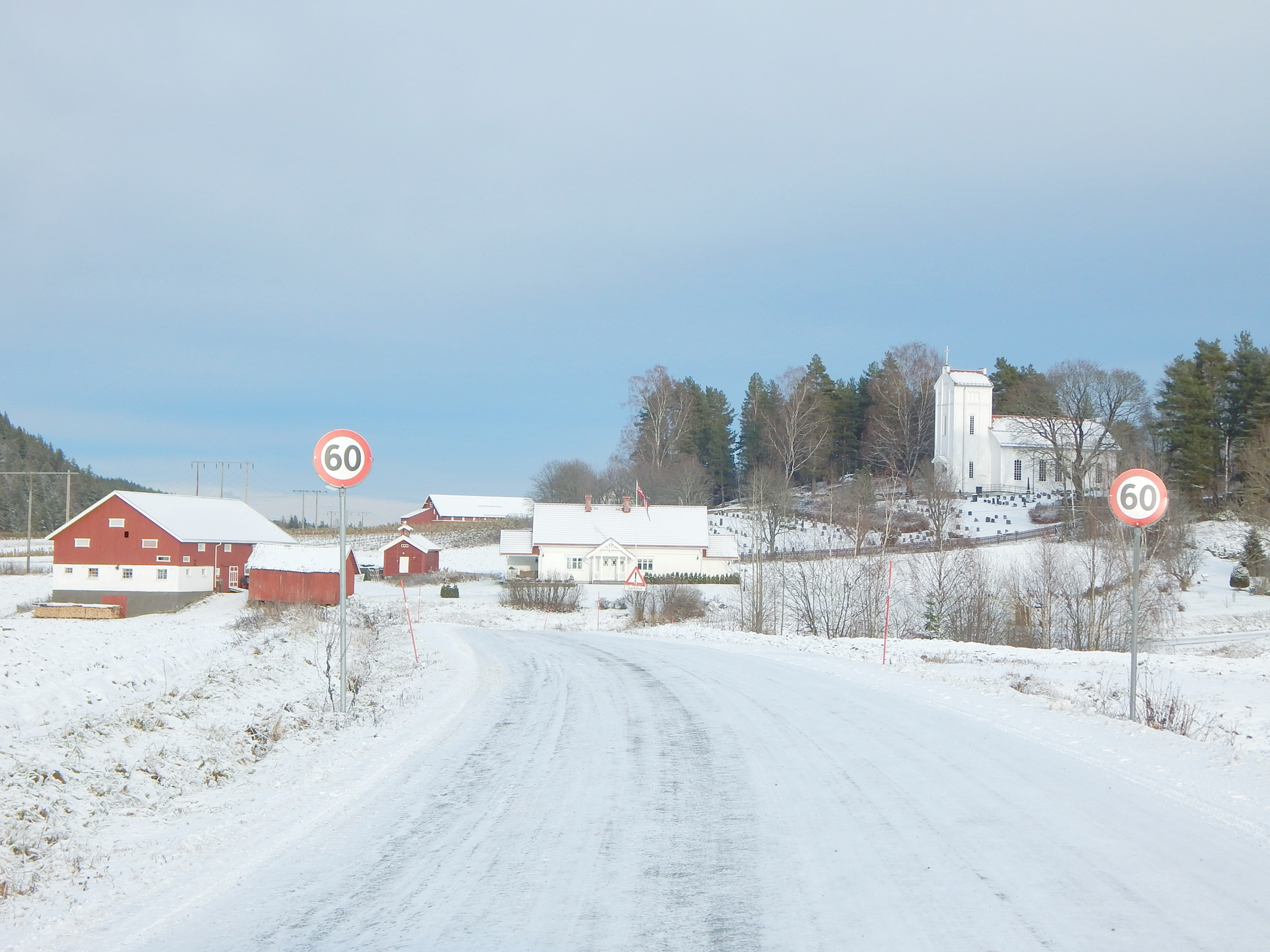

== See also ==
- List of churches in Tunsberg
