= New Church =

New Church may refer to:

== Church buildings ==
- New Church (Amsterdam), 15th-century church in Amsterdam, the Netherlands
- New Church (Constantinople), 9th-century church in Constantinople, Turkey
- New Church of the Theotokos, 6th-century church in Jerusalem, Israel
- Nykirken ("the New Church"), a 12th-century church in Bergen, Norway

== Church organization ==
- The New Church (Swedenborgian), a Protestant denomination

== Location ==
- New Church, Virginia, a census designated place in Virginia, USA

== See also ==
- Nouvelle-Église, French spelling
