= Canton of Marck =

Coordinates: 50.95°N 1.95°E

The canton of Marck is an administrative division of the Pas-de-Calais department, in northern France. It was created at the French canton reorganisation which came into effect in March 2015. Its seat is in Marck.

It consists of the following communes:

1. Audruicq
2. Guemps
3. Marck
4. Muncq-Nieurlet
5. Nortkerque
6. Nouvelle-Église
7. Offekerque
8. Oye-Plage
9. Polincove
10. Recques-sur-Hem
11. Ruminghem
12. Saint-Folquin
13. Saint-Omer-Capelle
14. Sainte-Marie-Kerque
15. Vieille-Église
16. Zutkerque
