= Mersin Old Mosque =

19th century mosque in Mersin, Turkey

Old Mosque (Eski Cami)
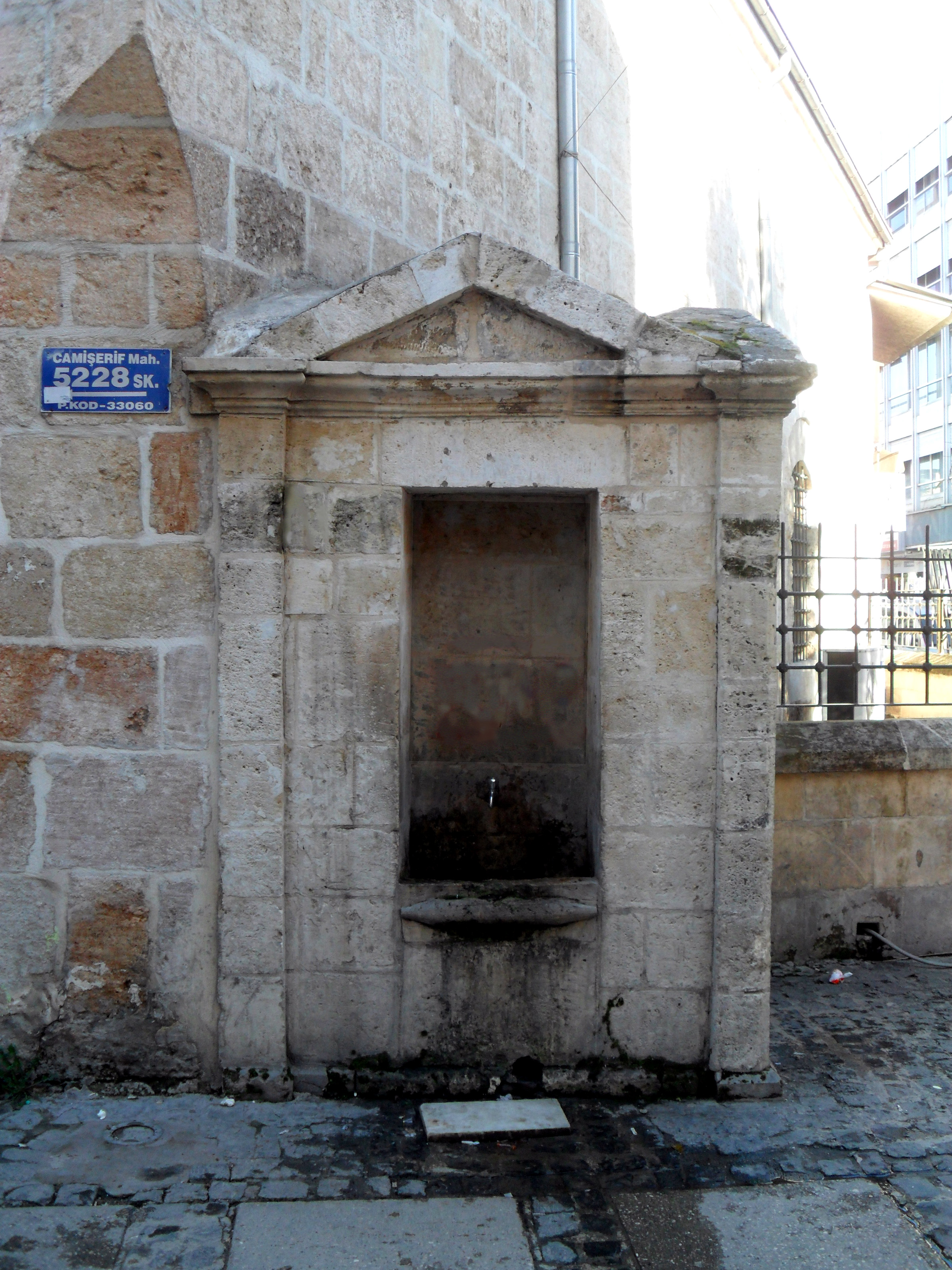

Religion
- Affiliation: Islam
- Province: Mersin Province
- Region: Mediterranean Region
- Rite: Sunni Islam
- Status: Active

Location
- Location: Mersin, Turkey
- Interactive map of Old Mosque (Eski Cami)

Architecture
- Type: Mosque
- Completed: 1870
- Minaret: 1

Old Mosque (Turkish: Eski Cami) is mosque in Mersin, Turkey.

== Location ==
The mosque is in the business quarters of the city at 36°48′N 34°38′E. The provincial governor's office is 200 metres (660 ft) to the east and the municipality is 400 metres (1,300 ft) to the southwest. Şavırvan, the fountain which is a complementary unit of the mosque is adjacent.

== History ==
In the 19th century Mersin was a small town and most of the coastline of the town belonged to the vakıf (foundation) of Bezmialem Sultan, mother of sultan Abdülmecit. In the 1860s the new sultan Abdülaziz decided to build a mosque and a fountain in the vakıf area. The fountain (with the water supply) was constructed in 1865 and the mosque in 1870. Originally these were named after the vakıf holder Bezmialem Sultan, the step mother of Abdülaziz. It is now the oldest mosque of Mersin which is still in use and it is properly called Old Mosque.

== Technical details ==
The old mosque is a single minaret mosque. Although commissioned by the sultan its dimensions are not comparable to those in Istanbul. The building is rectangular and the total area of the mosque including the nartex and the yard is about 600 square metres (6,500 sq ft). It has a wooden gable roof instead of a traditional dome. The mihrab is in a niche.

The mosque has been repaired in 1901, 1943 and 2008. The fountain, unlike most other mosques, is not in the yard: It faces Uray street to the south of the mosque.
