= Offekerque =

Offekerque Offekerke
- Commune
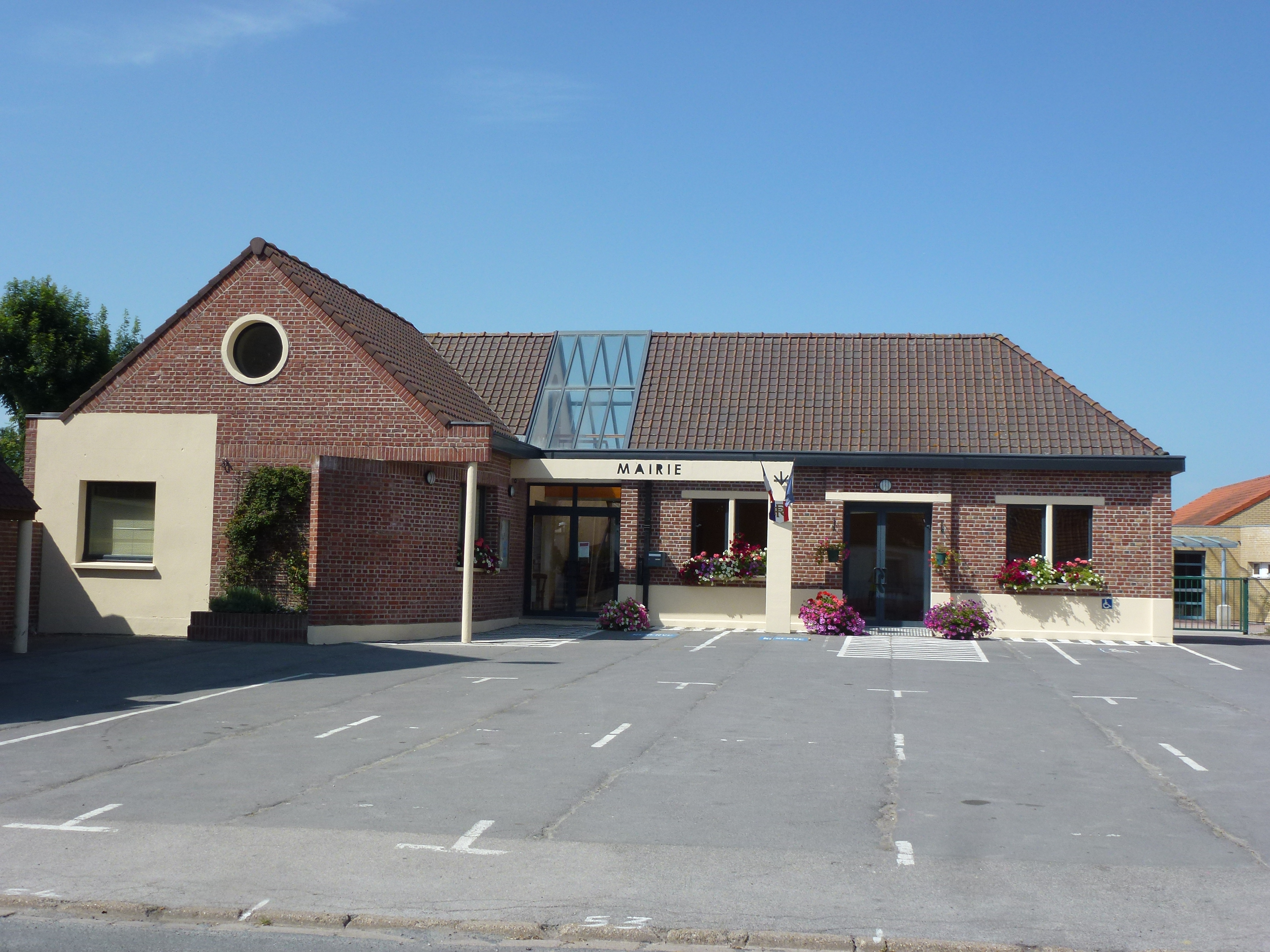
- The town hall of Offekerque

- Coat of arms
- Location of Offekerque
- Location within France Location within Hauts-de-France
- Coordinates: 50°56′31″N 2°01′10″E
- Country: France
- Region: Hauts-de-France
- Department: Pas-de-Calais
- Arrondissement: Calais
- Canton: Marck
- Intercommunality: CC Région d'Audruicq

Government
  - Mayor (2020–2026): Clotilde Beaufils
- Area^{1}: 13.37 km^{2} (5.16 sq mi)
- Elevation: 2 m (6.6 ft)
- Highest elevation: 5 m (16 ft)
- Lowest elevation: 1 m (3.3 ft)
- Population (2023): 1,291
  - Density: 96.56/km^{2} (250.1/sq mi)
- Time zone: UTC+01:00 (CET)
  - Summer (DST): UTC+02:00 (CEST)
- INSEE/Postal code: 62634 /62370
- ^{1} French Land Register data, which excludes lakes, ponds, glaciers > 1 km^{2} (0.386 sq mi or 247 acres) and river estuaries.

Offekerque (West Flemish: Offekerke) is a commune in the Pas-de-Calais department in the Hauts-de-France region of France about 6 miles (10 km) east of Calais.

== Population ==
Historical population
Year	Pop.	±% p.a.
1968	635	—
1975	628	−0.16%
1982	698	+1.52%
1990	759	+1.05%
1999	939	+2.39%
2007	1,043	+1.32%
2012	1,121	+1.45%
2017	1,167	+0.81%
2023	1,291	+1.70%
Source: INSEE

== See also ==
- Communes of the Pas-de-Calais department
