= Guemps =

Guemps Ganep (West Flemish) Guimpse (Picard)
- Commune
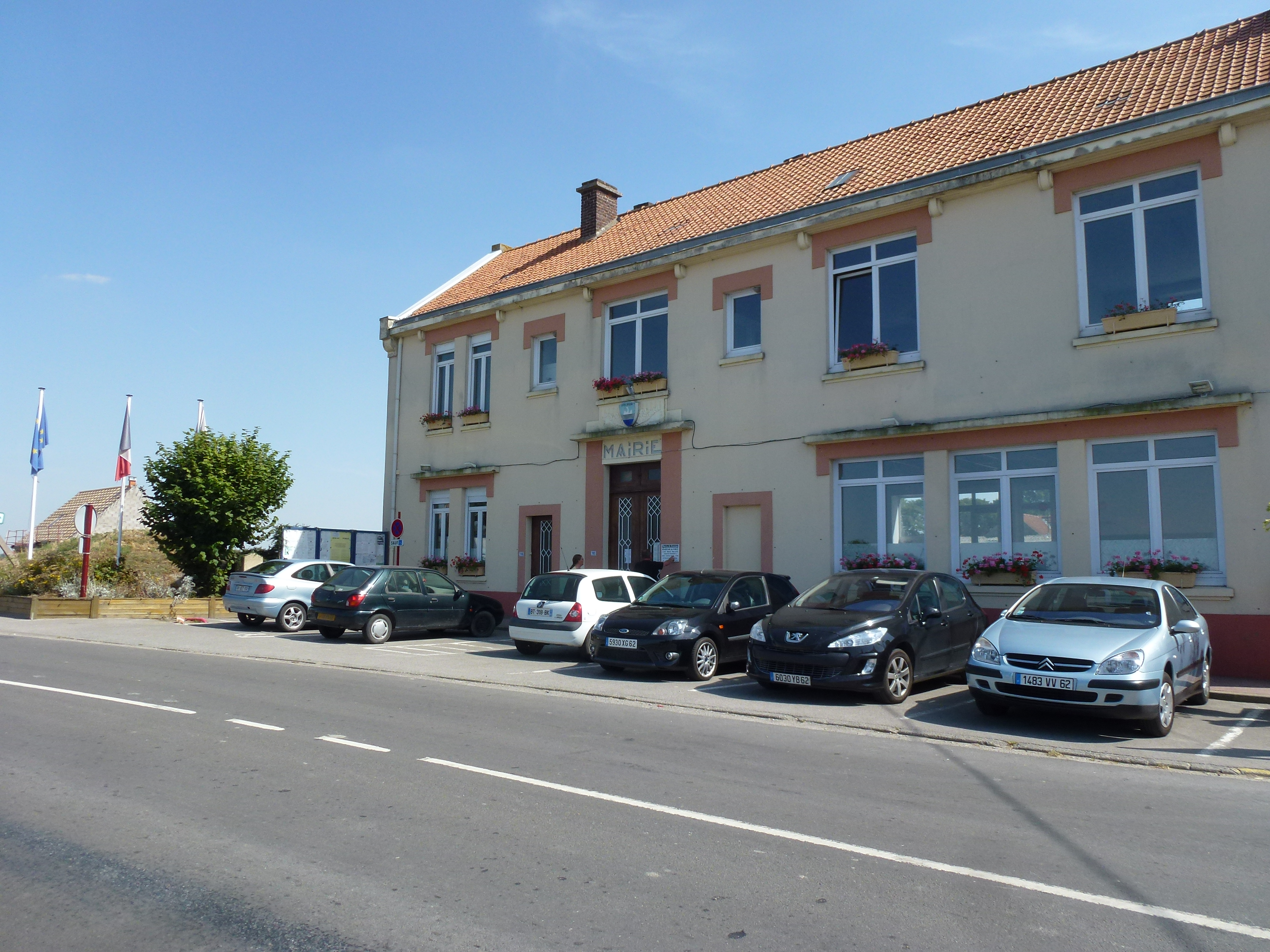
- The town hall of Guemps

- Coat of arms
- Location of Guemps
- Location within France Location within Hauts-de-France
- Coordinates: 50°54′56″N 1°59′48″E
- Country: France
- Region: Hauts-de-France
- Department: Pas-de-Calais
- Arrondissement: Calais
- Canton: Marck
- Intercommunality: CC Région d'Audruicq

Government
  - Mayor (2020–2026): Charles Cousin
- Area^{1}: 15.89 km^{2} (6.14 sq mi)
- Elevation: 3 m (9.8 ft)
- Highest elevation: 5 m (16 ft)
- Lowest elevation: 1 m (3.3 ft)
- Population (2023): 1,067
  - Density: 67.15/km^{2} (173.9/sq mi)
- Time zone: UTC+01:00 (CET)
  - Summer (DST): UTC+02:00 (CEST)
- INSEE/Postal code: 62393 /62370
- ^{1} French Land Register data, which excludes lakes, ponds, glaciers > 1 km^{2} (0.386 sq mi or 247 acres) and river estuaries.

Guemps (French pronunciation: [ɡɛms]; West Flemish: Ganep; Picard: Guimpse) is a commune in the Pas-de-Calais department in the Hauts-de-France region of France.

== Geography ==
A farming village situated 5 miles (8 km) southeast of Calais, at the D229 and D32 crossroads.

== Population ==
Historical population
Year	Pop.	±% p.a.
1968	797	—
1975	768	−0.53%
1982	808	+0.73%
1990	858	+0.75%
1999	882	+0.31%
2007	953	+0.97%
2012	1,031	+1.59%
2017	1,092	+1.16%
2023	1,067	−0.39%
Source: INSEE

== Places of interest ==
- The church of St.John the Baptist, dating from the fifteenth century.
- The windmills, used to pump water from the marshland.

== See also ==
- Communes of the Pas-de-Calais department
