= Audruicq =

Audruicq Ouderwijk
- Commune
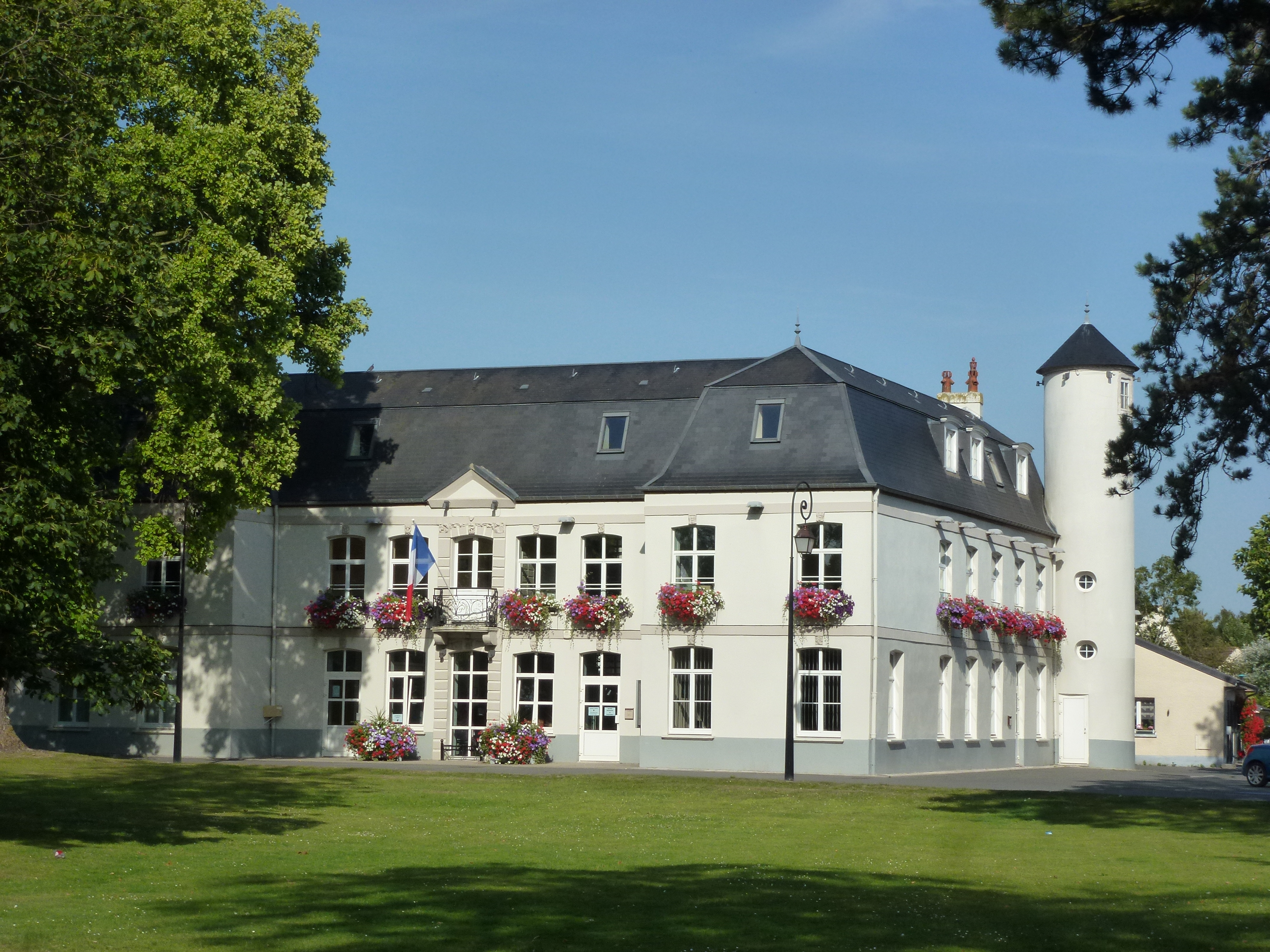
- The town hall of Audruicq

- Coat of arms
- Location of Audruicq
- Location within France Location within Hauts-de-France
- Coordinates: 50°52′47″N 2°04′53″E
- Country: France
- Region: Hauts-de-France
- Department: Pas-de-Calais
- Arrondissement: Calais
- Canton: Marck
- Intercommunality: CC Région d'Audruicq

Government
  - Mayor (2022–2026): Olivier Planque
- Area^{1}: 14.44 km^{2} (5.58 sq mi)
- Elevation: 10 m (33 ft)
- Highest elevation: 22 m (72 ft)
- Lowest elevation: 3 m (9.8 ft)
- Population (2023): 5,309
  - Density: 367.7/km^{2} (952.2/sq mi)
- Time zone: UTC+01:00 (CET)
  - Summer (DST): UTC+02:00 (CEST)
- INSEE/Postal code: 62057 /62370
- ^{1} French Land Register data, which excludes lakes, ponds, glaciers > 1 km^{2} (0.386 sq mi or 247 acres) and river estuaries.

Audruicq (French pronunciation: [odʁɥik]; West Flemish: Ouderwijk) is a commune in the Pas-de-Calais department in northern France.

== Geography ==
A town located 11 miles (18 km) southeast of Calais, at the junction of the D224 with the D309 road.

== History ==
Baldwin II, Count of Flanders named it a city in 1175, rebuilding the castle and converting the surrounding marshland to tillable soil. After continuously changing authority between the 13th century and the 17th century, Audruicq finally became a French town after the Peace of Nijmegen in 1678.

== Population ==
Historical population
Year	Pop.	±% p.a.
1968	3,606	—
1975	3,616	+0.04%
1982	4,078	+1.73%
1990	4,586	+1.48%
1999	4,555	−0.08%
2007	4,636	+0.22%
2012	5,204	+2.34%
2017	5,412	+0.79%
2023	5,309	−0.32%
Source: INSEE

== Sights ==
- The eighteenth-century church of St. Martin.
- The eighteenth-century château.

== Personalities ==
- Gilbert Brazy: Born at Audruicq on 15 February 1902. A pilot, he disappeared, flying a "Latham47" in the Arctic in 1928 with Roald Amundsen.

== International relations ==
Audruicq is twinned with: Hawkhurst in Kent, England, since 1998.

== See also ==
- Communes of the Pas-de-Calais department
