= Sainte-Marie-Kerque =

Sainte-Marie-Kerque Sinte-Mariakerke
- Commune
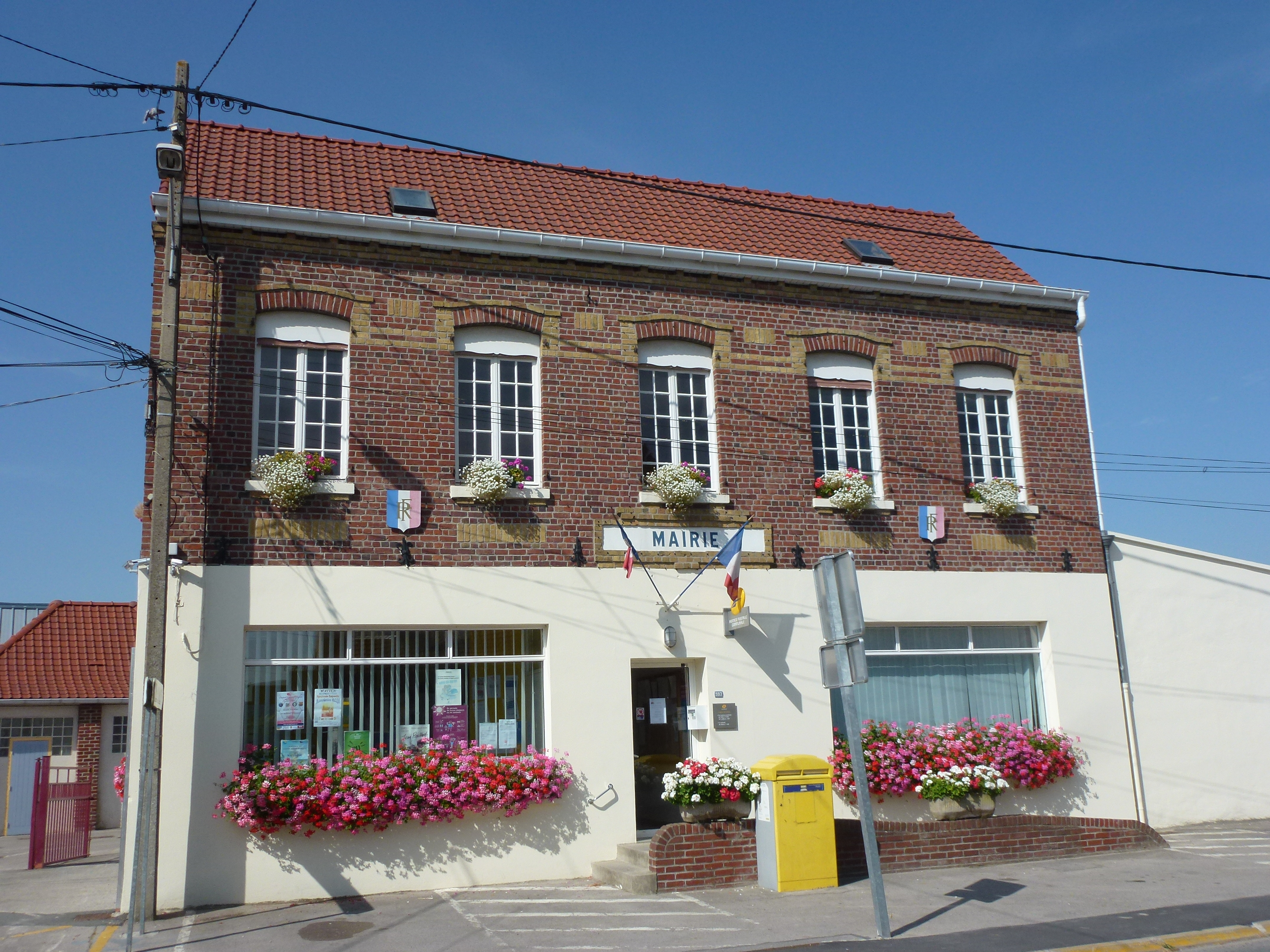
- The town hall of Sainte-Marie-Kerque

- Coat of arms
- Location of Sainte-Marie-Kerque
- Location within France Location within Hauts-de-France
- Coordinates: 50°54′00″N 2°08′19″E
- Country: France
- Region: Hauts-de-France
- Department: Pas-de-Calais
- Arrondissement: Calais
- Canton: Marck
- Intercommunality: CC Région d'Audruicq

Government
  - Mayor (2020–2026): Carole Duytsche
- Area^{1}: 18.47 km^{2} (7.13 sq mi)
- Elevation: 2 m (6.6 ft)
- Highest elevation: 5 m (16 ft)
- Lowest elevation: 2 m (6.6 ft)
- Population (2023): 1,708
  - Density: 92.47/km^{2} (239.5/sq mi)
- Time zone: UTC+01:00 (CET)
  - Summer (DST): UTC+02:00 (CEST)
- INSEE/Postal code: 62756 /62370
- ^{1} French Land Register data, which excludes lakes, ponds, glaciers > 1 km^{2} (0.386 sq mi or 247 acres) and river estuaries.

Sainte-Marie-Kerque (French pronunciation: [sɛ̃t maʁi kɛʁk]; West Flemish: Sinte-Mariakerke) is a commune in the Pas-de-Calais department in the Hauts-de-France region of France.

== Geography ==
Sainte-Marie-Kerque is located some 8 miles (13 km) to the east of Calais on the D224E1 and D218E1 roads.

== Population ==
Historical population
Year	Pop.	±% p.a.
1968	1,228	—
1975	1,224	−0.05%
1982	1,323	+1.12%
1990	1,322	−0.01%
1999	1,412	+0.73%
2007	1,531	+1.02%
2012	1,520	−0.14%
2017	1,648	+1.63%
2023	1,708	+0.60%
Source: INSEE

== Places of interest ==
- The church of Notre-Dame, dating from the fifteenth century.
- The church of St.Nicholas, dating from the nineteenth century.
- The Château du Wetz.

== See also ==
- Communes of the Pas-de-Calais department
