= Heggen Church =

Church in Buskerud, Norway

- Heggen kirke
- View of the church
- Heggen Church
- 59°56′27″N 10°00′05″E
- Location: Modum, Buskerud
- Country: Norway
- Denomination: Church of Norway
- Previous denomination: Catholic Church
- Churchmanship: Evangelical Lutheran

History
- Status: Parish church
- Founded: c. 1200
- Consecrated: c. 1200

Architecture
- Functional status: Active
- Architectural type: Cruciform
- Completed: c. 1200 (826 years ago)

Specifications
- Capacity: 396
- Materials: Stone

Administration
- Diocese: Tunsberg
- Deanery: Eiker prosti
- Parish: Modum
- Norwegian Cultural Heritage Site
- Type: Church
- Status: Automatically protected
- ID: 84519

Heggen Church (Norwegian: Heggen kirke) is a parish church of the Church of Norway in Modum Municipality in Buskerud county, Norway. It is located in the village of Vikersund. It is one of the churches for the Modum parish which is part of the Eiker prosti (deanery) in the Diocese of Tunsberg. The white, stone church was built in a cruciform design around the year 1200. The church seats about 396 people.

== History ==
The earliest existing historical records of the church date back to the year 1512, but the church was not built that year. The church was likely built around the year 1200. Originally this was a Romanesque long church in stone. It had a rectangular nave and a narrower and very short choir with an apse in the east.

In 1695 the church was enlarged by building a transept in the north. In 1714 the parish asked the government for permission to do the same and build a transept to the south because the church was too small. However, due to difficult financial times, the construction was delayed. Permission was finally granted in 1721, but the addition was not completed until 1725. After that, the church had a cruciform design rather than the original long church design. The church, like most other churches in Norway, was sold into private ownership during the Norwegian church sale in 1723 to help the King pay off war debts. This is why the 1725 addition was delayed. The new owner was Chancellor Schwartz, who funded the addition.

In 1814, this church served as an election church (Norwegian: valgkirke). Together with more than 300 other parish churches across Norway, it was a polling station for elections to the 1814 Norwegian Constituent Assembly which wrote the Constitution of Norway. This was Norway's first national election. Each church parish was a constituency that elected people called "electors" who later met together in each county to elect the representatives for the assembly that was to meet at Eidsvoll Manor later that year.

The church remained in private ownership until 1828 when the church ownership was transferred to the congregation. By that time, the church building was in poor condition. In 1832, the choir was extended and the tower was rebuilt under the builder Dideke (drawings and construction). For the choir, this meant that the apse and eastern part were demolished, and the new and extended choir was in the shape of a rectangle. The church was also expanded in 1877–1878 when a church porch was built on the west end (using plastered brick). In the 1950s, the plaster was removed from the original stone walls, which were plastered instead, so that the stone structure became visible.

== Media gallery ==
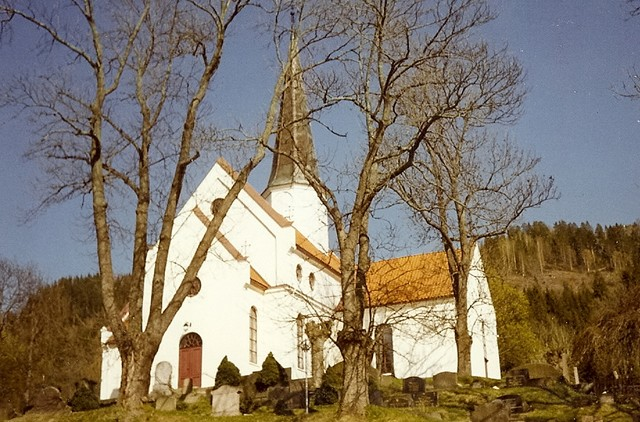

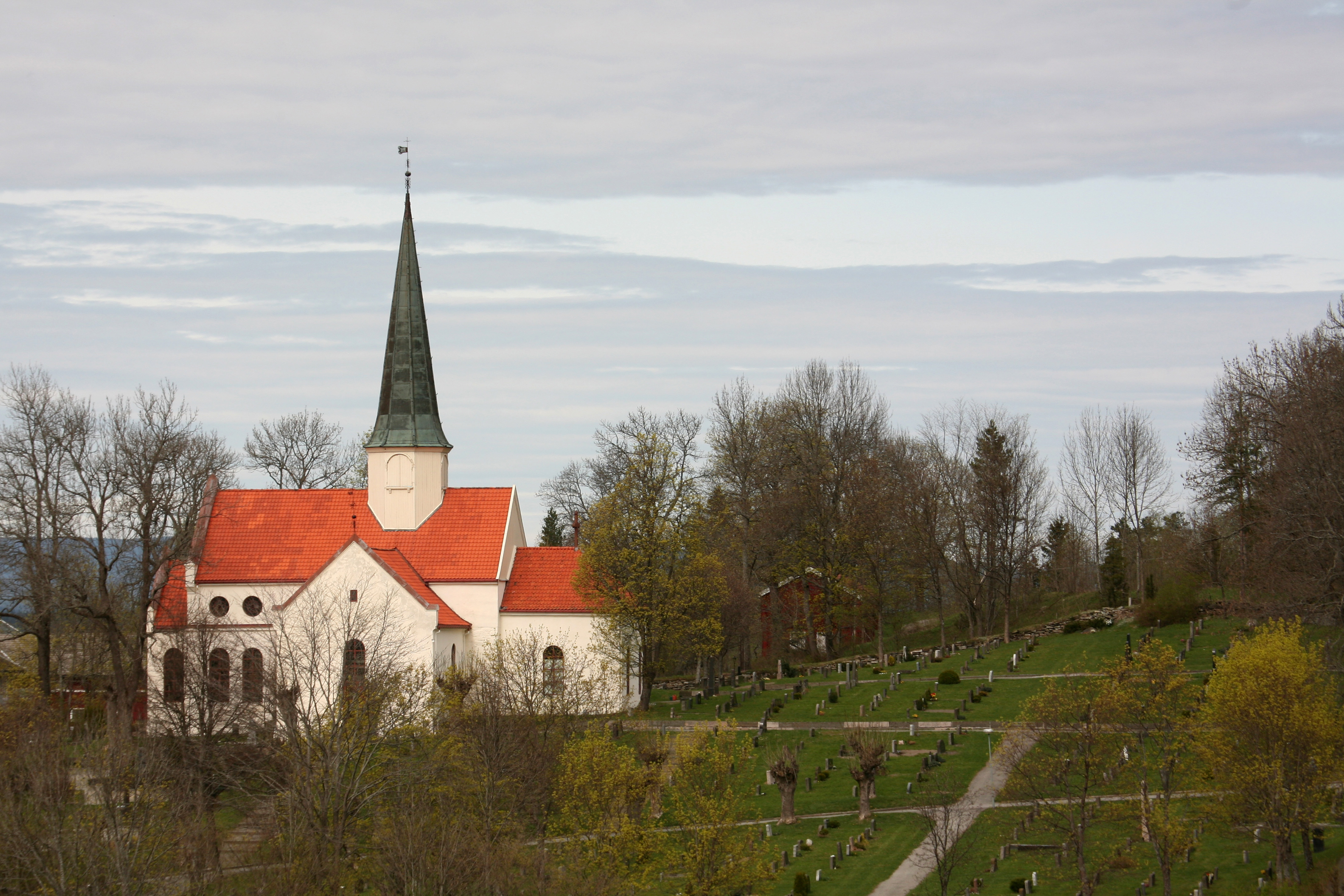

== See also ==
- List of churches in Tunsberg
