= Polincove =

- Commune
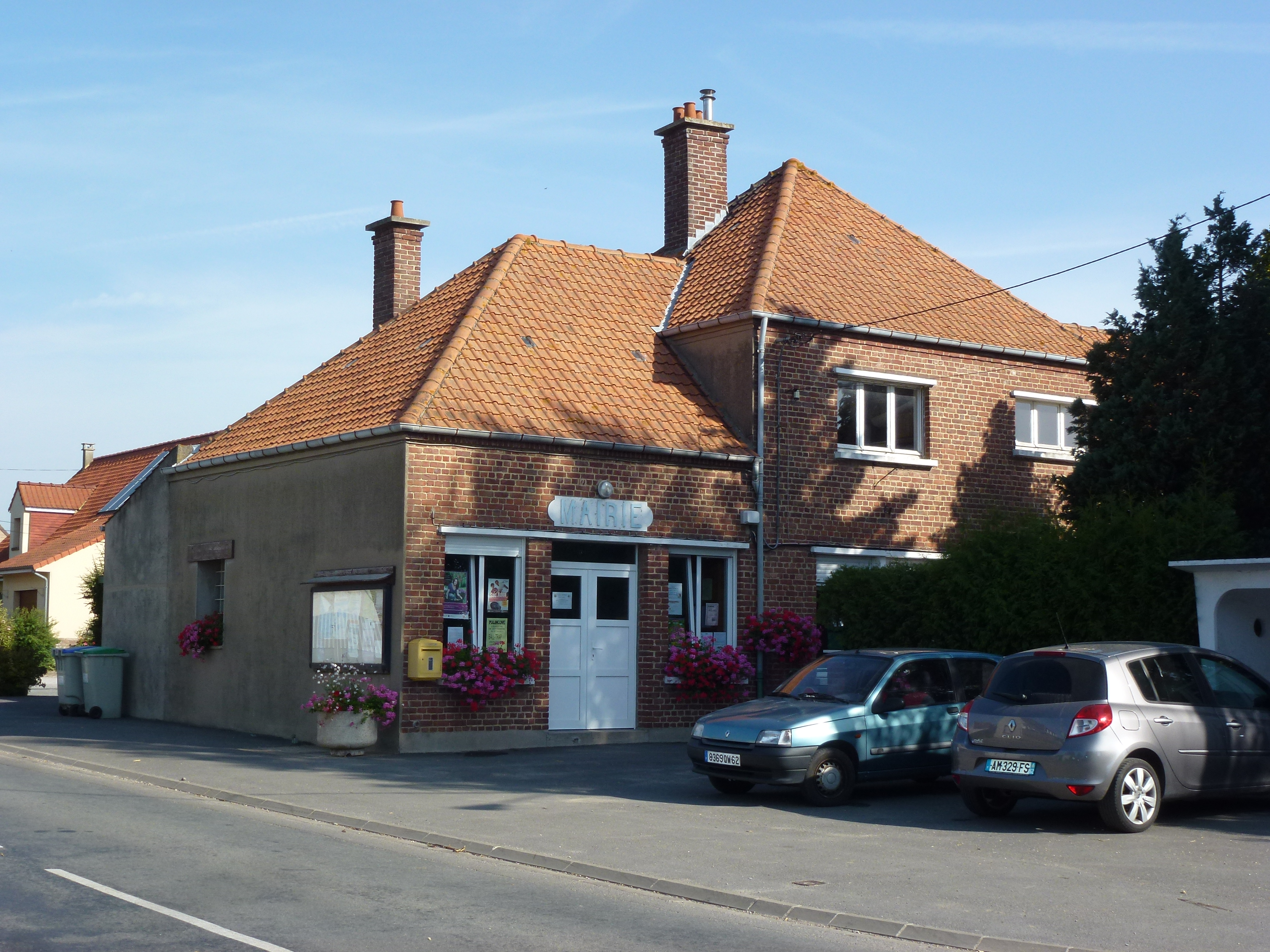
- The town hall of Polincove

- Coat of arms
- Location of Polincove
- Location within France Location within Hauts-de-France
- Coordinates: 50°51′05″N 2°05′32″E
- Country: France
- Region: Hauts-de-France
- Department: Pas-de-Calais
- Arrondissement: Calais
- Canton: Marck
- Intercommunality: CC Région d'Audruicq

Government
  - Mayor (2020–2026): Thierry Rouze
- Area^{1}: 4.75 km^{2} (1.83 sq mi)
- Elevation: 12 m (39 ft)
- Highest elevation: 21 m (69 ft)
- Lowest elevation: 1 m (3.3 ft)
- Population (2023): 867
  - Density: 183/km^{2} (473/sq mi)
- Time zone: UTC+01:00 (CET)
  - Summer (DST): UTC+02:00 (CEST)
- INSEE/Postal code: 62662 /62370
- ^{1} French Land Register data, which excludes lakes, ponds, glaciers > 1 km^{2} (0.386 sq mi or 247 acres) and river estuaries.

Polincove (French pronunciation: [pɔlɛ̃kɔv]; Dutch: Pollinkhove) is a commune in the Pas-de-Calais department in the Hauts-de-France region of France.

== Geography ==
Polincove lies about 10 miles (16 km) southeast of Calais, at the junction of the D218 and D219 roads and by the banks of the river Hem.

== Population ==
Historical population
Year	Pop.	±% p.a.
1968	395	—
1975	389	−0.22%
1982	416	+0.96%
1990	453	+1.07%
1999	560	+2.38%
2007	714	+3.08%
2012	799	+2.28%
2017	853	+1.32%
2023	867	+0.27%
Source: INSEE

== Places of interest ==
- The church of St. Leger, dating from the eighteenth century.

== See also ==
- Communes of the Pas-de-Calais department
