= Zutkerque =

Zutkerque Zuidkerke
- Commune
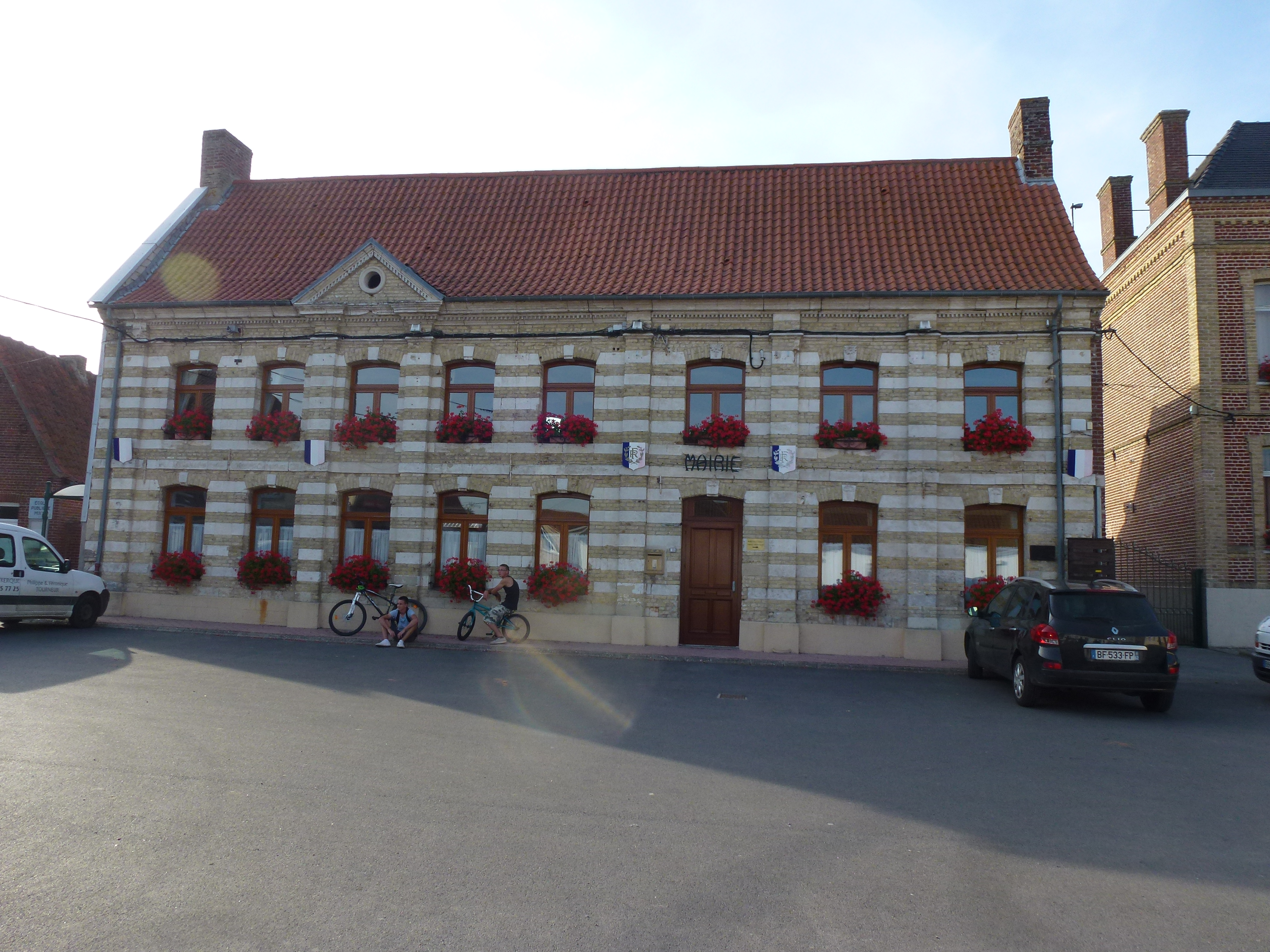
- The town hall of Zutkerque

- Coat of arms
- Location of Zutkerque
- Location within France Location within Hauts-de-France
- Coordinates: 50°51′16″N 2°04′06″E
- Country: France
- Region: Hauts-de-France
- Department: Pas-de-Calais
- Arrondissement: Calais
- Canton: Marck
- Intercommunality: Région d'Audruicq

Government
  - Mayor (2020–2026): Daniel Duriez
- Area^{1}: 16.41 km^{2} (6.34 sq mi)
- Elevation: 20 m (66 ft)
- Highest elevation: 55 m (180 ft)
- Lowest elevation: 3 m (9.8 ft)
- Population (2023): 1,820
  - Density: 111/km^{2} (287/sq mi)
- Demonym(s): Zutkerquois, Zutkerquoises
- Time zone: UTC+01:00 (CET)
  - Summer (DST): UTC+02:00 (CEST)
- INSEE/Postal code: 62906 /62370
- ^{1} French Land Register data, which excludes lakes, ponds, glaciers > 1 km^{2} (0.386 sq mi or 247 acres) and river estuaries.

Zutkerque (French pronunciation: [zytkɛʁk]; West Flemish: Zuidkerke) is a commune in the Pas-de-Calais department in the Hauts-de-France region of France 11 miles (17 km) northwest of Saint-Omer.

== Population ==
Historical population

| Year | Pop. | ±% p.a. |
|---|---|---|
| 1793 | 1,364 | — |
| 1800 | 1,544 | +1.79% |
| 1806 | 1,631 | +0.92% |
| 1821 | 1,894 | +1.00% |
| 1831 | 1,862 | −0.17% |
| 1836 | 1,814 | −0.52% |
| 1841 | 1,773 | −0.46% |
| 1846 | 1,795 | +0.25% |
| 1851 | 1,778 | −0.19% |
| 1856 | 1,735 | −0.49% |
| 1861 | 1,705 | −0.35% |
| 1866 | 1,680 | −0.29% |
| 1872 | 1,663 | −0.17% |
| 1876 | 1,609 | −0.82% |
| 1881 | 1,585 | −0.30% |
| 1886 | 1,619 | +0.43% |
| 1891 | 1,591 | −0.35% |
| 1896 | 1,617 | +0.32% |
| 1901 | 1,606 | −0.14% |

| Year | Pop. | ±% p.a. |
|---|---|---|
| 1906 | 1,650 | +0.54% |
| 1911 | 1,606 | −0.54% |
| 1921 | 1,368 | −1.59% |
| 1926 | 1,456 | +1.25% |
| 1931 | 1,426 | −0.42% |
| 1936 | 1,454 | +0.39% |
| 1946 | 1,383 | −0.50% |
| 1954 | 1,299 | −0.78% |
| 1962 | 1,291 | −0.08% |
| 1968 | 1,293 | +0.03% |
| 1975 | 1,308 | +0.16% |
| 1982 | 1,553 | +2.48% |
| 1990 | 1,723 | +1.31% |
| 1999 | 1,713 | −0.06% |
| 2007 | 1,712 | −0.01% |
| 2012 | 1,713 | +0.01% |
| 2017 | 1,753 | +0.46% |
| 2023 | 1,820 | +0.63% |

Source: EHESS (1793-1999) and INSEE

== See also ==
- Communes of the Pas-de-Calais department
