= Yeni Mosque, Mytilene =

Former mosque in Mytilene, Greece

Yeni Mosque
- Γενί Τζαμί
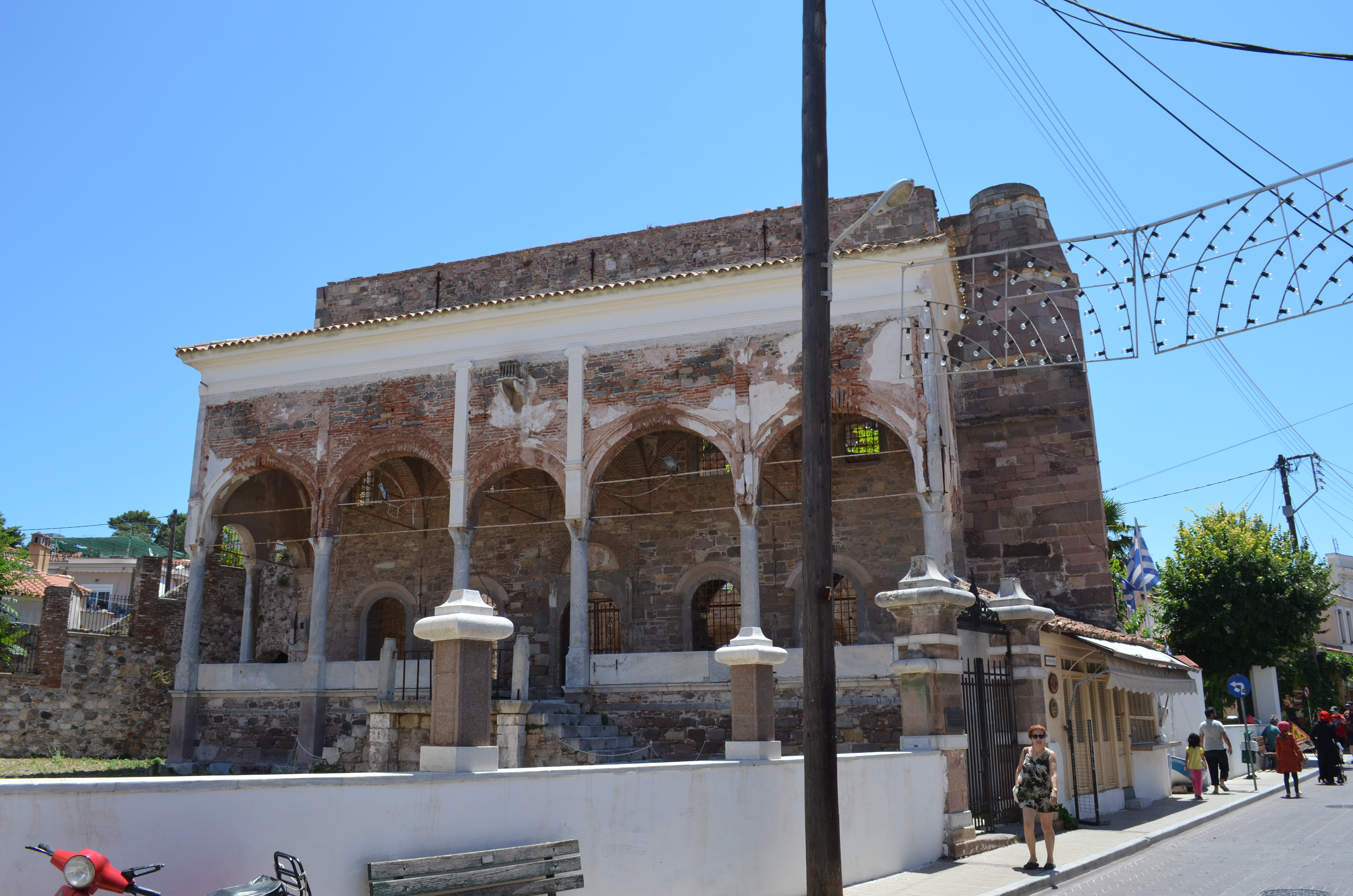
- Portico entrance of the former mosque in 2016

- Location of the former mosque in Greece

Religion
- Affiliation: Sunni Islam (former)
- Ecclesiastical or organisational status: Mosque (1825–1923)
- Status: Abandoned (as a mosque); Partial ruins

Location
- Location: Mytilene, Lesbos, North Aegean
- Country: Greece
- Interactive map of Yeni Mosque
- Coordinates: 39°06′40″N 26°33′11″E

Architecture
- Type: Mosque
- Style: Ottoman; Byzantine elements
- Founder: Mustafa Agha Koulaxiz
- Completed: 1825

Specifications
- Domes: 1 (collapsed, 1951)
- Minaret: 1 (destroyed)
- Materials: Brick; stone

The Yeni Mosque (Greek: Γενί Τζαμί, from Turkish: Yeni Cami, lit. 'New Mosque') is a former mosque in partial ruins, located in Mytilene on the island of Lesbos, in the North Aegean region of Greece. It was built in 1825 by local governor Mustafa Agha Koulaxiz, the largest and newest of the Ottoman era mosques on the island. The greater complex eventually included a madrasa, mufti's rooms, and a cemetery. In 1923, following the Balkan Wars, the Muslim population left Lesbos, and the mosque was abandoned. Over the decades it accumulated significant wear resulting in its roof collapsing. Some restoration works were completed in the early 2000s.

== Location ==
The mosque is on Ermou street in Epano Skala, the old Turkish neighborhood of Mytilene, at the center of the old Turkish market. Epano Skala is located to the north of the modern city center and west of the old harbor.

== History ==
During the late Midde Ages, Mytilene, the capital of the island of Lesbos, saw immense prosperity as a result of the commercial activities of the wealthy Genoa fleet. It was conquered by the Ottomans on 14 September 1462 after two weeks of siege. The Ottomans installed garrison and janissaries which formed the initial Muslim community of the island that would expand greatly in the following centuries.

With the end of piracy in the 18th century and a new era of stability kicking off, the island began to develop and progress as economic activities rose up, with Mytilenaean merchants expanding their markets as Mytilene became an important port connecting Constantinople, Smyrna and Alexandria, the most important cities in the Ottoman Empire.

=== Construction and fate ===
The Yeni Mosque, the largest and most recent mosque in Lesbos was commissioned and funded in 1825 by Mustafa Agha Koulaxiz, a tax collector and governor of Mytilene. The mosque was built in the bazaar district where the Muslims had their shops. A madrasa, founded by Hadji Muhammed Agha, the mansion of the Mufti Halim Pasha, and an Ottoman cemetery completed the mosque complex to the north and east.

In 1923 when the Muslim community of the island was forced to leave Lesbos as part of the agreed population exchange between Greece and Turkey, rural Muslims stayed in the mosque briefly. Their exodus led to the mosque being abandoned and neglected for decades, resulting in its gradual collapse.

The dome collapsed in 1951, with some of its materials looted and sold, leaving the mosque's interior vulnerable to the harsh weather conditions. Although there were plans for demolition, it was decided against after opposition from the locals. The Hellenic Ministry of Culture classified the Yeni Mosque as a monument for the first time in 1956, and in 1979 the municipality asked architect Constantinos Mylonas to submit a preservation proposal, although the necessary funds would not be raised for another twenty years. The initial restoration works were completed under the supervision of the 14th Ephorate of Byzantine Antiquities.

In 2011, 35 volunteers, members of Aeolistas civil initiative group, cleaned the mosque, although it remained in need of renovation. In 2014 then-mayor Spyros Galinos promised to restore the building with funds from the European Union.

== Architecture ==
The Yeni Mosque is one of the five preserved examples of the quatrefoil plan in Greece, with both Ottoman and Byzantine elements in its architecture with its distinctive high-drum dome located far from the exterior walls.

== See also ==
- Islam in Greece
- List of former mosques in Greece
- Ottoman Greece
