= Nouvelle-Église =

Nouvelle-Église Nieuwkerke
- Commune
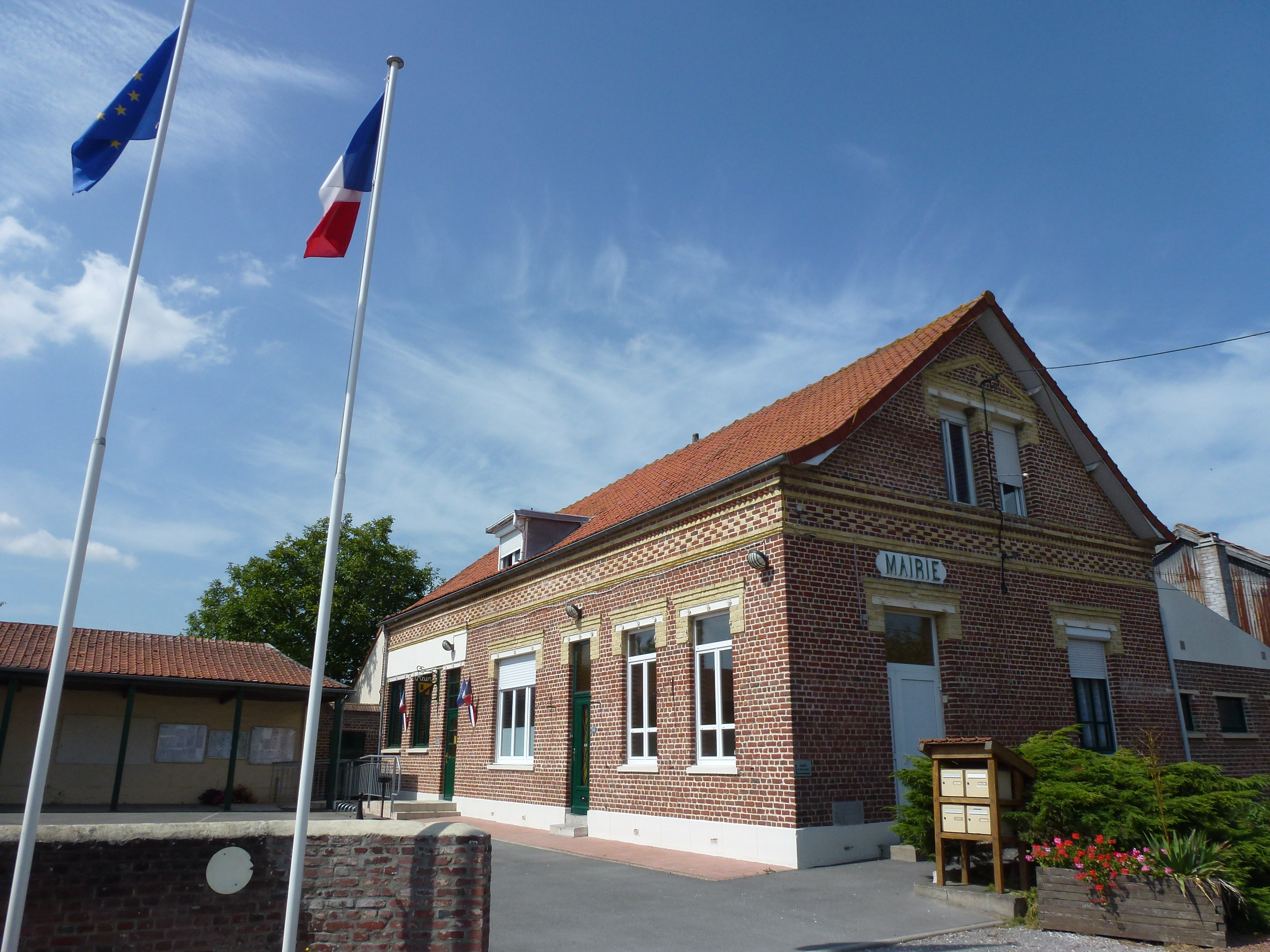
- The town hall of Nouvelle-Église

- Coat of arms
- Location of Nouvelle-Église
- Location within France Location within Hauts-de-France
- Coordinates: 50°55′33″N 2°03′18″E
- Country: France
- Region: Hauts-de-France
- Department: Pas-de-Calais
- Arrondissement: Calais
- Canton: Marck
- Intercommunality: CC Région d'Audruicq

Government
  - Mayor (2020–2026): Patrick Way
- Area^{1}: 9.07 km^{2} (3.50 sq mi)
- Elevation: 2 m (6.6 ft)
- Highest elevation: 5 m (16 ft)
- Lowest elevation: 1 m (3.3 ft)
- Population (2023): 709
  - Density: 78.2/km^{2} (202/sq mi)
- Time zone: UTC+01:00 (CET)
  - Summer (DST): UTC+02:00 (CEST)
- INSEE/Postal code: 62623 /62370
- ^{1} French Land Register data, which excludes lakes, ponds, glaciers > 1 km^{2} (0.386 sq mi or 247 acres) and river estuaries.

Nouvelle-Église (French pronunciation: [nuvɛl eɡliz]; West Flemish: Nieuwkerke; both lit. 'New Church')is a commune in the Pas-de-Calais department in the Hauts-de-France region of France about 6 miles (9 km) east of Calais.

== Population ==
Historical population
Year	Pop.	±% p.a.
1968	291	—
1975	268	−1.17%
1982	276	+0.42%
1990	322	+1.95%
1999	343	+0.70%
2007	486	+4.45%
2012	535	+1.94%
2017	679	+4.88%
2023	709	+0.72%
Source: INSEE

== See also ==
- Communes of the Pas-de-Calais department
