= Saint-Folquin =

Saint-Folquin Sint-Volkwin
- Commune
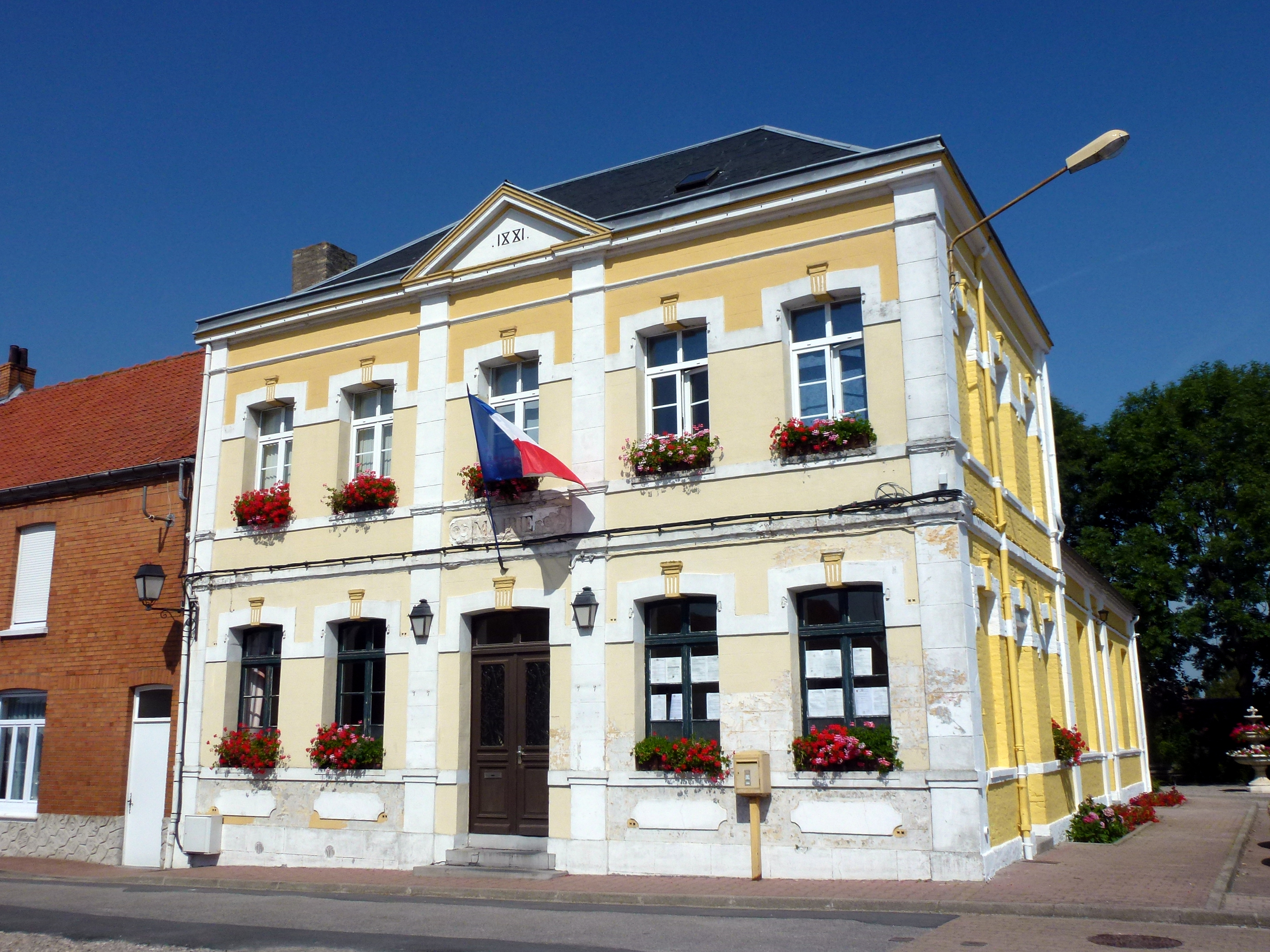
- The town hall of Saint-Folquin

- Coat of arms
- Location of Saint-Folquin
- Location within France Location within Hauts-de-France
- Coordinates: 50°56′49″N 2°07′24″E
- Country: France
- Region: Hauts-de-France
- Department: Pas-de-Calais
- Arrondissement: Calais
- Canton: Marck
- Intercommunality: CC Région d'Audruicq

Government
  - Mayor (2020–2026): Yves Engrand
- Area^{1}: 17.95 km^{2} (6.93 sq mi)
- Elevation: 3 m (9.8 ft)
- Highest elevation: 10 m (33 ft)
- Lowest elevation: 0 m (0 ft)
- Population (2023): 2,349
  - Density: 130.9/km^{2} (338.9/sq mi)
- Time zone: UTC+01:00 (CET)
  - Summer (DST): UTC+02:00 (CEST)
- INSEE/Postal code: 62748 /62370
- ^{1} French Land Register data, which excludes lakes, ponds, glaciers > 1 km^{2} (0.386 sq mi or 247 acres) and river estuaries.

Saint-Folquin (French pronunciation: [sɛ̃ fɔlkɛ̃]; West Flemish: Sint-Volkwin) is a commune in the Pas-de-Calais department in the Hauts-de-France region of France named for a 9th-century Christian saint named Folquin.

== Geography ==
Saint-Folquin is located some 8 miles (13 km) east of Calais on the D229 road, just yards from junction 51 of the A16 autoroute.

== Population ==
Historical population
Year	Pop.	±% p.a.
1968	1,335	—
1975	1,383	+0.51%
1982	1,754	+3.45%
1990	1,973	+1.48%
1999	2,062	+0.49%
2007	2,267	+1.19%
2012	2,167	−0.90%
2017	2,248	+0.74%
2023	2,349	+0.74%
Source: INSEE

== Places of interest ==
- The church of St. Folquin, dating from the sixteenth century
- The motte of a 14th-century castle

== See also ==
- Communes of the Pas-de-Calais department
