= Saint-Omer-Capelle =

Saint-Omer-Capelle Sint-Omaarskapelle
- Commune
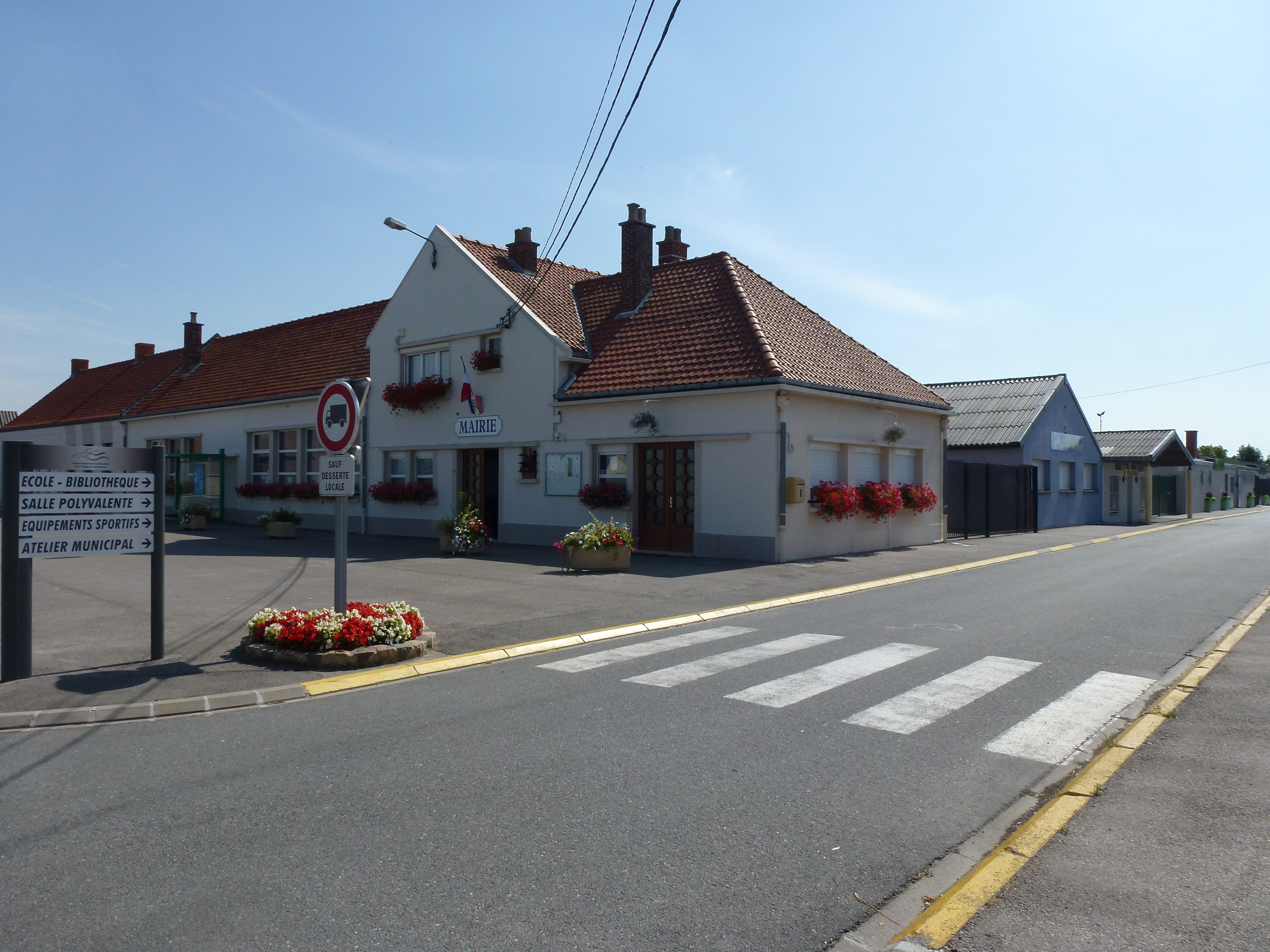
- The town hall of Saint-Omer-Capelle

- Coat of arms
- Location of Saint-Omer-Capelle
- Location within France Location within Hauts-de-France
- Coordinates: 50°56′23″N 2°06′06″E
- Country: France
- Region: Hauts-de-France
- Department: Pas-de-Calais
- Arrondissement: Calais
- Canton: Marck
- Intercommunality: CC Région d'Audruicq

Government
  - Mayor (2020–2026): Béatrice Boulanger
- Area^{1}: 10.69 km^{2} (4.13 sq mi)
- Elevation: 3 m (9.8 ft)
- Highest elevation: 5 m (16 ft)
- Lowest elevation: 1 m (3.3 ft)
- Population (2023): 1,073
  - Density: 100.4/km^{2} (260.0/sq mi)
- Time zone: UTC+01:00 (CET)
  - Summer (DST): UTC+02:00 (CEST)
- INSEE/Postal code: 62766 /62162
- ^{1} French Land Register data, which excludes lakes, ponds, glaciers > 1 km^{2} (0.386 sq mi or 247 acres) and river estuaries.

Saint-Omer-Capelle (French pronunciation: [sɛ̃t‿omɛʁ kapɛl]; West Flemish: Sint-Omaarskapelle) is a commune in the Pas-de-Calais department in the Hauts-de-France region of France about 8 miles (13 km) east of Calais.

== Population ==
Historical population
| Year | Pop. | ±% p.a. |
|---|---|---|
| 1968 | 538 | — |
| 1975 | 528 | −0.27% |
| 1982 | 698 | +4.07% |
| 1990 | 757 | +1.02% |
| 1999 | 835 | +1.10% |
| 2007 | 1,016 | +2.48% |
| 2012 | 1,121 | +1.99% |
| 2017 | 1,095 | −0.47% |
| 2023 | 1,073 | −0.34% |
Source: INSEE

== See also ==
- Communes of the Pas-de-Calais department
