= Ruminghem =

- Commune
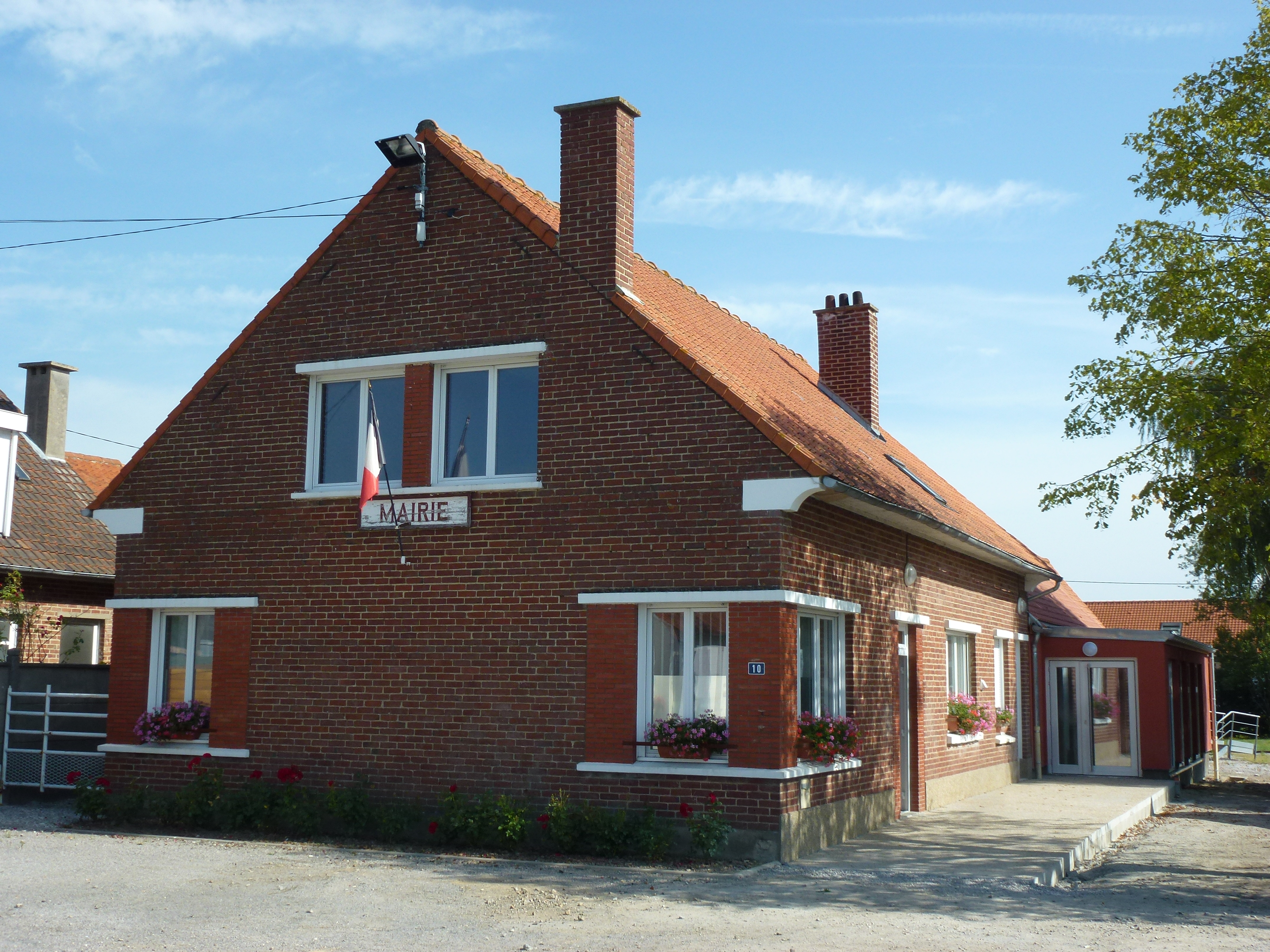
- The town hall of Ruminghem

- Coat of arms
- Location of Ruminghem
- Location within France Location within Hauts-de-France
- Coordinates: 50°51′37″N 2°09′31″E
- Country: France
- Region: Hauts-de-France
- Department: Pas-de-Calais
- Arrondissement: Calais
- Canton: Marck
- Intercommunality: CC Région d'Audruicq

Government
  - Mayor (2024–2026): Christian Wacsin
- Area^{1}: 13.89 km^{2} (5.36 sq mi)
- Elevation: 3 m (9.8 ft)
- Highest elevation: 64 m (210 ft)
- Lowest elevation: 1 m (3.3 ft)
- Population (2023): 1,614
  - Density: 116.2/km^{2} (301.0/sq mi)
- Time zone: UTC+01:00 (CET)
  - Summer (DST): UTC+02:00 (CEST)
- INSEE/Postal code: 62730 /62370
- ^{1} French Land Register data, which excludes lakes, ponds, glaciers > 1 km^{2} (0.386 sq mi or 247 acres) and river estuaries.

Ruminghem (French pronunciation: [ʁymɛ̃ɡɛm]) is a commune in the Pas-de-Calais department in the Hauts-de-France region of France about 10 miles (16 km) north of Saint-Omer.

== Population ==
Historical population
Year	Pop.	±% p.a.
1968	968	—
1975	927	−0.62%
1982	1,019	+1.36%
1990	1,120	+1.19%
1999	1,163	+0.42%
2007	1,464	+2.92%
2012	1,619	+2.03%
2017	1,650	+0.38%
2023	1,614	−0.37%
Source: INSEE

== See also ==
- Communes of the Pas-de-Calais department
- Chinese Labour Corps
