= Vieille-Église =

Vieille-Église Oudekerke
- Commune
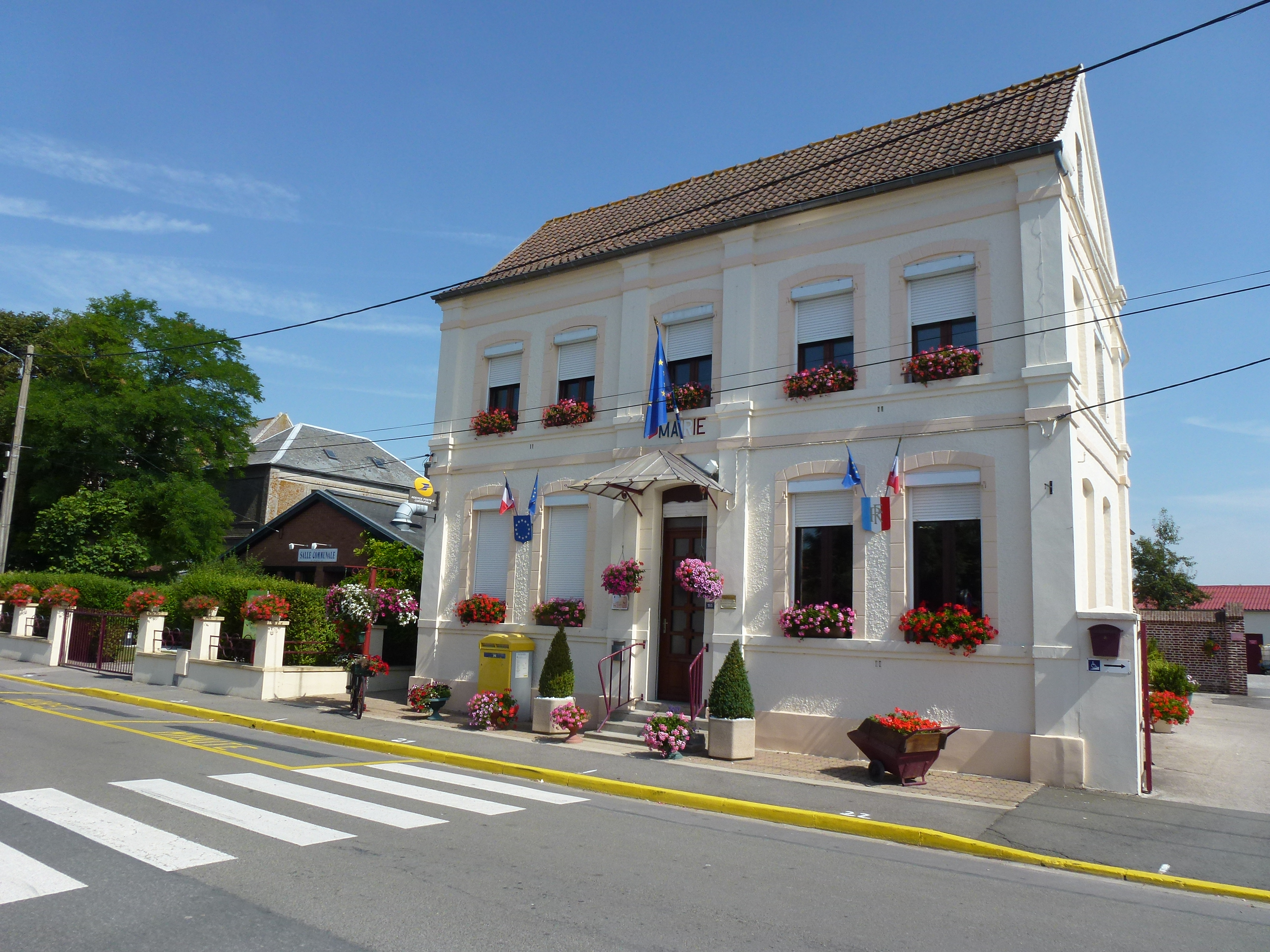
- The town hall of Vieille-Église

- Coat of arms
- Location of Vieille-Église
- Location within France Location within Hauts-de-France
- Coordinates: 50°55′45″N 2°04′39″E
- Country: France
- Region: Hauts-de-France
- Department: Pas-de-Calais
- Arrondissement: Calais
- Canton: Marck
- Intercommunality: CC Région d'Audruicq

Government
  - Mayor (2020–2026): Joël Levreay
- Area^{1}: 21.12 km^{2} (8.15 sq mi)
- Elevation: 8 m (26 ft)
- Highest elevation: 5 m (16 ft)
- Lowest elevation: 1 m (3.3 ft)
- Population (2023): 1,511
  - Density: 71.54/km^{2} (185.3/sq mi)
- Time zone: UTC+01:00 (CET)
  - Summer (DST): UTC+02:00 (CEST)
- INSEE/Postal code: 62852 /62162
- ^{1} French Land Register data, which excludes lakes, ponds, glaciers > 1 km^{2} (0.386 sq mi or 247 acres) and river estuaries.

Vieille-Église (French pronunciation: [vjɛj eɡliz]; West Flemish: Ouderkerke; both lit. 'Old Church') is a commune in the Pas-de-Calais department in the Hauts-de-France region of France 9 miles (15 km) east of Calais.

== Population ==
Historical population
Year	Pop.	±% p.a.
1968	940	—
1975	980	+0.60%
1982	1,003	+0.33%
1990	968	−0.44%
1999	1,139	+1.82%
2007	1,240	+1.07%
2012	1,420	+2.75%
2017	1,382	−0.54%
2023	1,511	+1.50%
Source: INSEE

== See also ==
- Communes of the Pas-de-Calais department
