= Oye-Plage =

Oye-Plage Ooie
- Commune
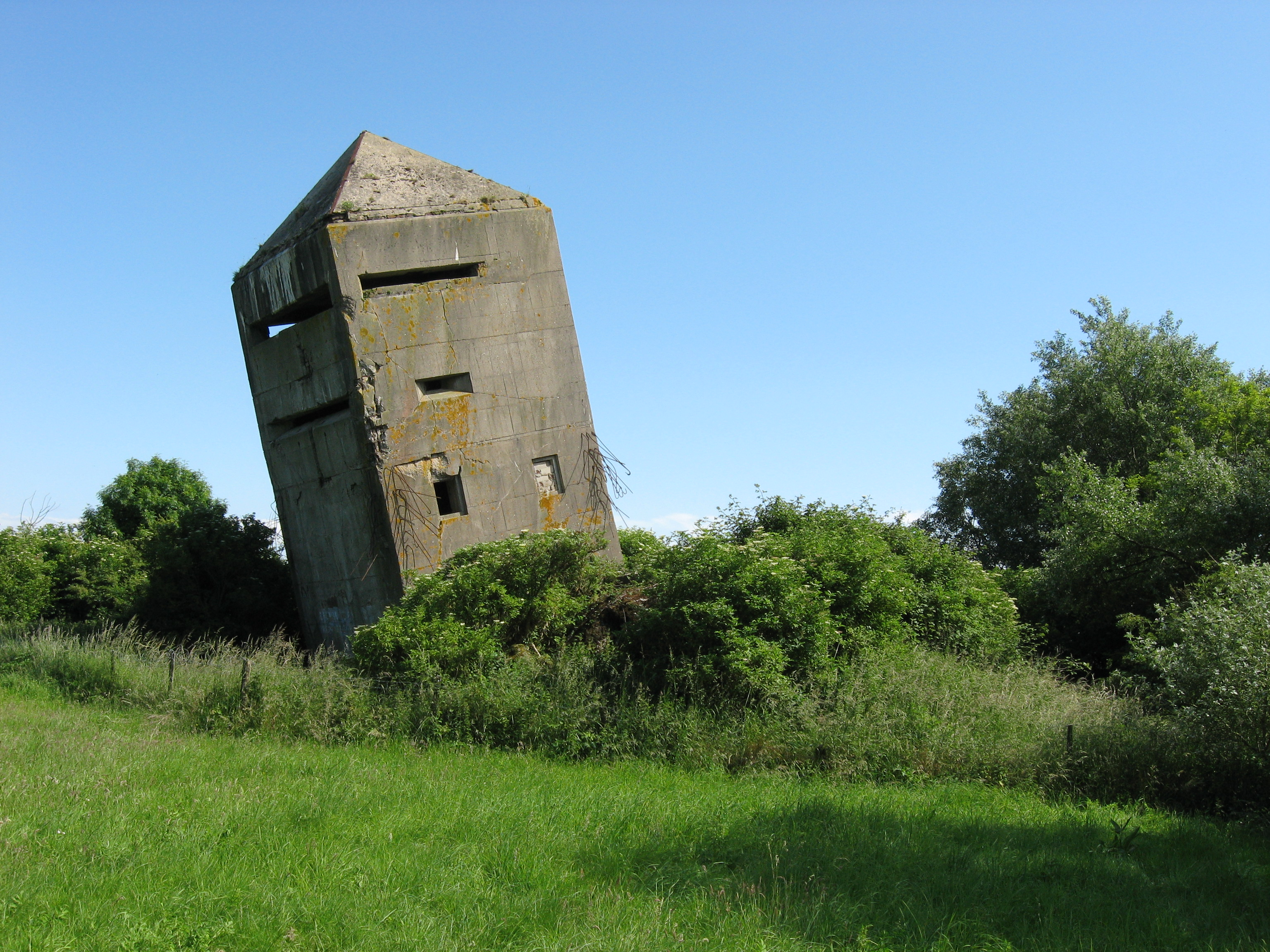
- La tour penchée, a blockhouse in Oye-Plage

- Coat of arms
- Location of Oye-Plage
- Location within France Location within Hauts-de-France
- Coordinates: 50°58′43″N 2°02′42″E
- Country: France
- Region: Hauts-de-France
- Department: Pas-de-Calais
- Arrondissement: Calais
- Canton: Marck
- Intercommunality: CC Région d'Audruicq

Government
  - Mayor (2020–2026): Olivier Majewicz
- Area^{1}: 33.86 km^{2} (13.07 sq mi)
- Elevation: 4 m (13 ft)
- Highest elevation: 14 m (46 ft)
- Lowest elevation: 0 m (0 ft)
- Population (2023): 5,780
  - Density: 171/km^{2} (442/sq mi)
- Time zone: UTC+01:00 (CET)
  - Summer (DST): UTC+02:00 (CEST)
- INSEE/Postal code: 62645 /62215
- ^{1} French Land Register data, which excludes lakes, ponds, glaciers > 1 km^{2} (0.386 sq mi or 247 acres) and river estuaries.

Oye-Plage (French pronunciation: [wa plaʒ]; West Flemish: Ooie) is a commune in the Pas-de-Calais department in the Hauts-de-France region of France about 7 miles (11 km) east of Calais, nearly a mile from the English Channel.

== Population ==
Historical population
Year	Pop.	±% p.a.
1968	2,326	—
1975	2,482	+0.93%
1982	4,479	+8.80%
1990	5,678	+3.01%
1999	5,882	+0.39%
2007	5,638	−0.53%
2012	5,378	−0.94%
2017	5,373	−0.02%
2023	5,780	+1.22%
Source: INSEE

== Twin town ==
On 27 September 1992 Oye-Plage was twinned with the English village of Capel-le-Ferne.

== See also ==
- Communes of the Pas-de-Calais department
