= Canton of Guînes =

Coordinates: 50°49′09″N 1°52′20″E

Guînes
- Former canton
- Interactive map of Guînes
- Country: France
- Region: Hauts-de-France
- Department: Pas-de-Calais
- No. of communes: {{{nbcomm}}}
- Disbanded: 2015
- Area: 147.81 km^{2} (57.07 sq mi)
- Population (2012): 16,775
  - Density: 113.49/km^{2} (293.94/sq mi)

The canton of Guînes is a former canton situated in the department of the Pas-de-Calais and in the Nord-Pas-de-Calais region of northern France. It was disbanded following the French canton reorganisation which came into effect in March 2015. It had a total of 16,775 inhabitants (2012).

== Geography ==
The canton is organised around Guînes in the arrondissement of Calais. The altitude varies from 0m (Guînes) to 199m (Herbinghen) for an average altitude of 59m.

The canton comprised 16 communes:

- Alembon
- Andres
- Bouquehault
- Boursin
- Caffiers
- Campagne-lès-Guines
- Fiennes
- Guînes
- Hames-Boucres
- Hardinghen
- Herbinghen
- Hermelinghen
- Hocquinghen
- Licques
- Pihen-lès-Guînes
- Sanghen

== Population ==
Population Evolution
| 1962 | 1968 | 1975 | 1982 | 1990 | 1999 |
|---|---|---|---|---|---|
| 12017 | 12739 | 12778 | 13575 | 14001 | 14577 |
Census count starting from 1962 : Population without double counting

== See also ==
- Cantons of Pas-de-Calais
- Communes of Pas-de-Calais
- Arrondissements of the Pas-de-Calais department
