= Canton of Ardres =

Coordinates: 50°48′57″N 2°01′34″E

Ardres
- Former canton
- Interactive map of Ardres
- Country: France
- Region: Hauts-de-France
- Department: Pas-de-Calais
- No. of communes: {{{nbcomm}}}
- Disbanded: 2015
- Area: 180.33 km^{2} (69.63 sq mi)
- Population (2012): 21,370
  - Density: 118.5/km^{2} (306.9/sq mi)

The canton of Ardres is a former canton situated in the department of the Pas-de-Calais and in the Nord-Pas-de-Calais region of northern France. It was disbanded following the French canton reorganisation which came into effect in March 2015. It had a total of 21,370 inhabitants (2012, without double counting).

== Geography ==
The canton was organised around Ardres in the arrondissement of Saint-Omer. The altitude varied from 0m (Éperlecques) to 196m (Rebergues) for an average altitude of 42m.

The canton comprised 22 communes:

- Ardres
- Audrehem
- Autingues
- Balinghem
- Bayenghem-lès-Éperlecques
- Bonningues-lès-Ardres
- Brêmes
- Clerques
- Éperlecques
- Journy
- Landrethun-lès-Ardres
- Louches
- Mentque-Nortbécourt
- Muncq-Nieurlet
- Nielles-lès-Ardres
- Nordausques
- Nort-Leulinghem
- Rebergues
- Recques-sur-Hem
- Rodelinghem
- Tournehem-sur-la-Hem
- Zouafques

== Population ==
Population Evolution
1962	1968	1975	1982	1990	1999
12536	13188	13277	14515	16519	17610
Census count starting from 1962 : Population without double counting

== See also ==
- Cantons of Pas-de-Calais
- Communes of Pas-de-Calais
- Arrondissements of the Pas-de-Calais department
