= Canton of Calais-Sud-Est =

Coordinates: 50.9500°N 1.8333°E

Calais-Sud-Est
- Former canton
- Interactive map of Calais-Sud-Est
- Country: France
- Region: Hauts-de-France
- Department: Pas-de-Calais
- No. of communes: {{{nbcomm}}}
- Disbanded: 2015
- Population (2012): 20,623

The canton of Calais-Sud-Est is a former canton situated in the department of the Pas-de-Calais of northern France. It was disbanded following the French canton reorganisation which came into effect in March 2015. It consisted of part of the commune of Calais, and its population was 20,623 in 2012.

== Geography ==
The canton is organised around Calais in the arrondissement of Calais. The altitude varies from 0m to 18m for an average altitude of 5m.

== See also ==
- Cantons of Pas-de-Calais
- Communes of Pas-de-Calais
- Arrondissements of the Pas-de-Calais department
