= Canton of Calais-Centre =

Coordinates: 50°55′34″N 1°53′29″E

Calais-Centre
- Former canton
- Interactive map of Calais-Centre
- Country: France
- Region: Hauts-de-France
- Department: Pas-de-Calais
- No. of communes: {{{nbcomm}}}
- Disbanded: 2015
- Population (2012): 27,832

The canton of Calais-Centre is a former canton situated in the department of the Pas-de-Calais and in the Nord-Pas-de-Calais region of northern France. It was disbanded following the French canton reorganisation which came into effect in March 2015. It consisted of 3 communes, which joined the canton of Calais-2 in 2015. It had a total of 27,832 inhabitants (2012).

== Geography ==
The canton is organised around Calais in the arrondissement of Calais. The altitude varies from 0 m (0 ft) (Les Attaques) to 18 m (59 ft) (Calais) for an average altitude of 4 m (13 ft).

The canton comprised 3 communes:

- Les Attaques
- Calais (partly)
- Coulogne

== See also ==
- Cantons of Pas-de-Calais
- Communes of Pas-de-Calais
- Arrondissements of the Pas-de-Calais department
