= Canton of Calais-Est =

Coordinates: 50°56′56″N 1°54′24″E

Calais-Est
- Former canton
- Interactive map of Calais-Est
- Country: France
- Region: Hauts-de-France
- Department: Pas-de-Calais
- No. of communes: {{{nbcomm}}}
- Disbanded: 2015
- Population (2012): 24,112

The canton of Calais-Est is a former canton situated in the department of the Pas-de-Calais and in the Nord-Pas-de-Calais region of northern France. It was disbanded following the French canton reorganisation, which came into effect in March 2015. It had a total of 24,112 inhabitants (2012).

== Geography ==
The canton is organised around Calais in the arrondissement of Calais. The altitude varies from 0m to 18m in Calais for an average altitude of 5m.

The canton comprised 2 communes:

- Calais (partly)
- Marck

== See also ==
- Cantons of Pas-de-Calais
- Communes of Pas-de-Calais
- Arrondissements of the Pas-de-Calais department
