= Jean-Jacques Barthe =

French politician (1936–2022)

Member of the Parliamentary Assembly of the Council of Europe
- In office 30 September 1981 – 30 April 1982

Member of the French National Assembly
- In office 2 April 1973 – 14 May 1988
- Constituency: Pas-de-Calais's 7th constituency

General Councilor of the Canton of Calais-Centre
- In office 1973–1979

Mayor of Calais
- In office March 1971 – 27 March 2000
- Preceded by: Charles Beaugrand
- Succeeded by: Jacky Hénin

Personal details
- Born: 27 June 1936 Calais, France
- Died: 10 June 2022 (aged 85) Calais, France
- Party: PCF
- Occupation: Teacher

Jean-Jacques Barthe (27 June 1936 – 10 June 2022) was a French politician.

== Biography ==
A teacher by occupation, Barthe joined the French Communist Party (PCF) in 1961, where he became a member of the Calais local office in 1963. He served on Calais's municipal council from March 1969 until his election as mayor in 1971. He resigned from this position on 27 March 2000 after nearly 30 years of service.

Barthe was elected to the National Assembly in 1973, where he represented Pas-de-Calais's 7th constituency. He was also General Councilor of the Canton of Calais-Centre from 1973 to 1979.

Jean-Jacques Barthe died in Calais on 10 June 2022, at the age of 85.

== Decorations ==
- Knight of the National Order of Merit (2001)[5]
