= Communauté de communes des Pays d'Opale =

Federation of municipalities in France

Coordinates: 50.87°N 1.87°E

Pays d'Opale
- Communauté de communes
- Country: France
- Region: Hauts-de-France
- Department: Pas-de-Calais
- No. of communes: {{{nbcomm}}}
- Established: 27 December 1996

Government
  - President: Ludovic Loquet
- Area: 189.3 km^{2} (73.1 sq mi)
- Population (2018): 25,188
  - Density: 133.1/km^{2} (344.6/sq mi)
- Website: www.cc-paysdopale.fr

The communauté de communes des Pays d'Opale (before 2017: communauté de communes des Trois Pays) was created on 27 December 1996 and is located in the Pas-de-Calais département, in northern France. It lost four communes to the agglomeration community Grand Calais Terres et Mers on 1 December 2019. Its seat is Guînes. Its area is 189.3 km^{2}, and its population was 25,188 in 2018.

== Composition ==
The communauté de communes consists of the following 23 communes:

1. Alembon
2. Andres
3. Ardres
4. Autingues
5. Bainghen
6. Balinghem
7. Bouquehault
8. Boursin
9. Brêmes
10. Caffiers
11. Campagne-lès-Guines
12. Fiennes
13. Guînes
14. Hardinghen
15. Herbinghen
16. Hermelinghen
17. Hocquinghen
18. Landrethun-lès-Ardres
19. Licques
20. Louches
21. Nielles-lès-Ardres
22. Rodelinghem
23. Sanghen
