= Campagne-lès-Guines =

Campagne-lès-Guînes
- Commune
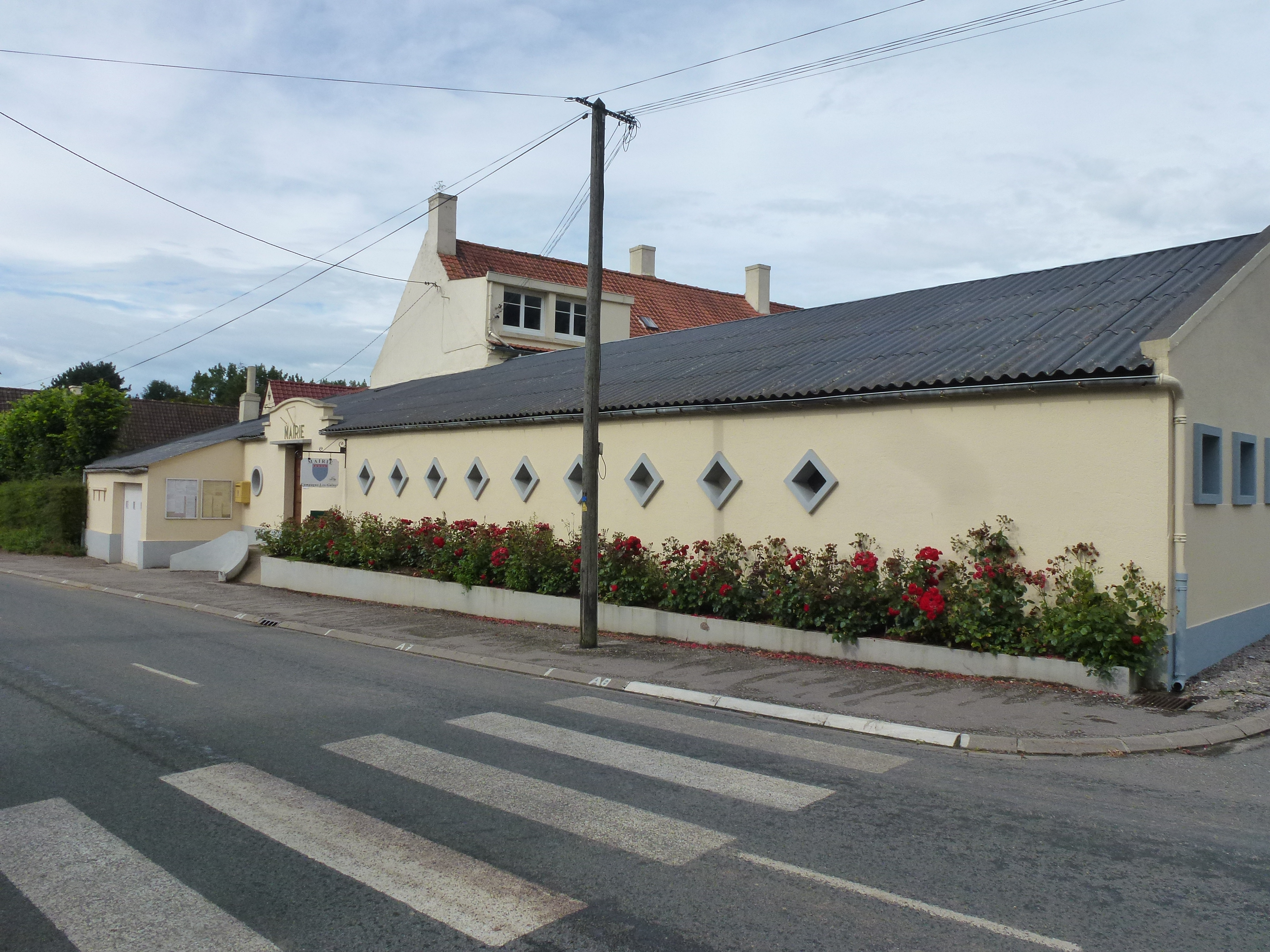
- The town hall of Campagne-lès-Guines

- Coat of arms
- Location of Campagne-lès-Guînes
- Location within France Location within Hauts-de-France
- Coordinates: 50°50′26″N 1°54′17″E
- Country: France
- Region: Hauts-de-France
- Department: Pas-de-Calais
- Arrondissement: Calais
- Canton: Calais-2
- Intercommunality: CC Pays d'Opale

Government
  - Mayor (2020–2026): Bruno Demilly
- Area^{1}: 5.72 km^{2} (2.21 sq mi)
- Elevation: 45 m (148 ft)
- Highest elevation: 160 m (520 ft)
- Lowest elevation: 21 m (69 ft)
- Population (2023): 407
  - Density: 71.2/km^{2} (184/sq mi)
- Time zone: UTC+01:00 (CET)
  - Summer (DST): UTC+02:00 (CEST)
- INSEE/Postal code: 62203 /62340
- ^{1} French Land Register data, which excludes lakes, ponds, glaciers > 1 km^{2} (0.386 sq mi or 247 acres) and river estuaries.

Campagne-lès-Guines (French pronunciation: [kɑ̃paɲ lɛ ɡin], literally Campagne near Guines) is a commune in the Pas-de-Calais department in the Hauts-de-France region of France 10 miles (16 km) south of Calais.

== Population ==
Historical population
Year	Pop.	±% p.a.
1968	295	—
1975	296	+0.05%
1982	370	+3.24%
1990	406	+1.17%
1999	452	+1.20%
2007	454	+0.06%
2012	451	−0.13%
2017	445	−0.27%
2023	407	−1.48%
Source: INSEE

== See also ==
- Communes of the Pas-de-Calais department
