= Nielles-lès-Ardres =

- Commune
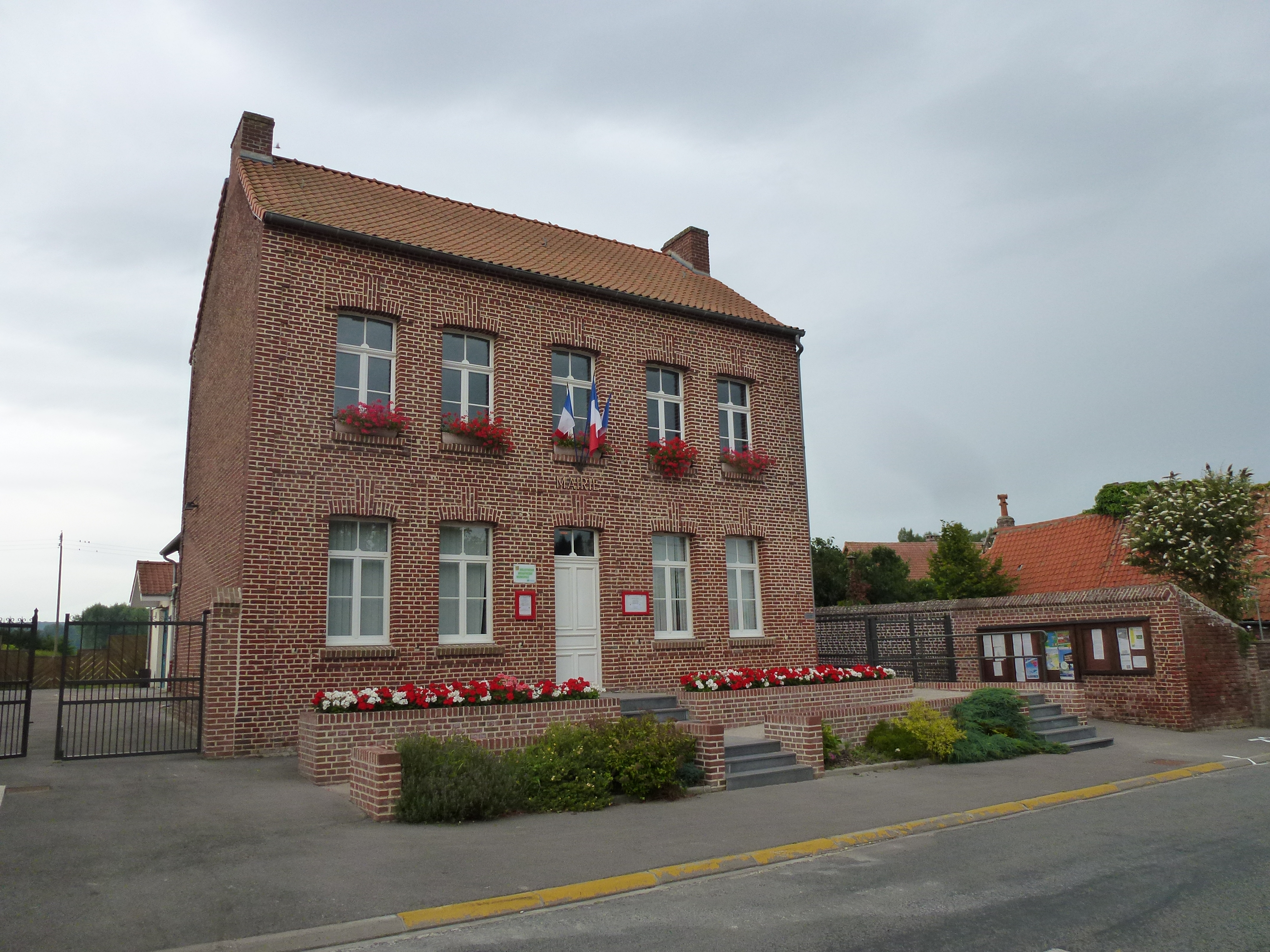
- The town hall of Nielles-lès-Ardres

- Coat of arms
- Location of Nielles-lès-Ardres
- Location within France Location within Hauts-de-France
- Coordinates: 50°50′33″N 2°01′02″E
- Country: France
- Region: Hauts-de-France
- Department: Pas-de-Calais
- Arrondissement: Calais
- Canton: Calais-2
- Intercommunality: CC Pays d'Opale

Government
  - Mayor (2020–2026): Pierre-Eloi Calais
- Area^{1}: 4.48 km^{2} (1.73 sq mi)
- Elevation: 9 m (30 ft)
- Highest elevation: 29 m (95 ft)
- Lowest elevation: 1 m (3.3 ft)
- Population (2023): 577
  - Density: 129/km^{2} (334/sq mi)
- Time zone: UTC+01:00 (CET)
  - Summer (DST): UTC+02:00 (CEST)
- INSEE/Postal code: 62614 /62610
- ^{1} French Land Register data, which excludes lakes, ponds, glaciers > 1 km^{2} (0.386 sq mi or 247 acres) and river estuaries.

Nielles-lès-Ardres (French pronunciation: [njɛl lɛ.z‿aʁdʁ], literally Nielles near Ardres; Dutch: Niel-bij-Aarde) is a commune in the Pas-de-Calais department in the Hauts-de-France region of France.

== Geography ==
Nielles-lès-Ardres lies about 14 miles (22 km) northwest of Saint-Omer, on the D225E road.

== Population ==
Historical population
Year	Pop.	±% p.a.
1968	261	—
1975	282	+1.11%
1982	344	+2.88%
1990	383	+1.35%
1999	444	+1.66%
2007	484	+1.08%
2012	521	+1.48%
2017	557	+1.35%
2023	577	+0.59%
Source: INSEE

== Places of interest ==
- The church of St. Pierre, dating from the year 1200.
- Ruins of the château de la Montoire, destroyed by the duc de Vendôme in 1542.
- Château de la Cressonnerie, built between 1808/1812.
- The seventeenth century ‘Le Colombier’, an enormous round tower.

== See also ==
- Communes of the Pas-de-Calais department
