= Bainghen =

- Commune
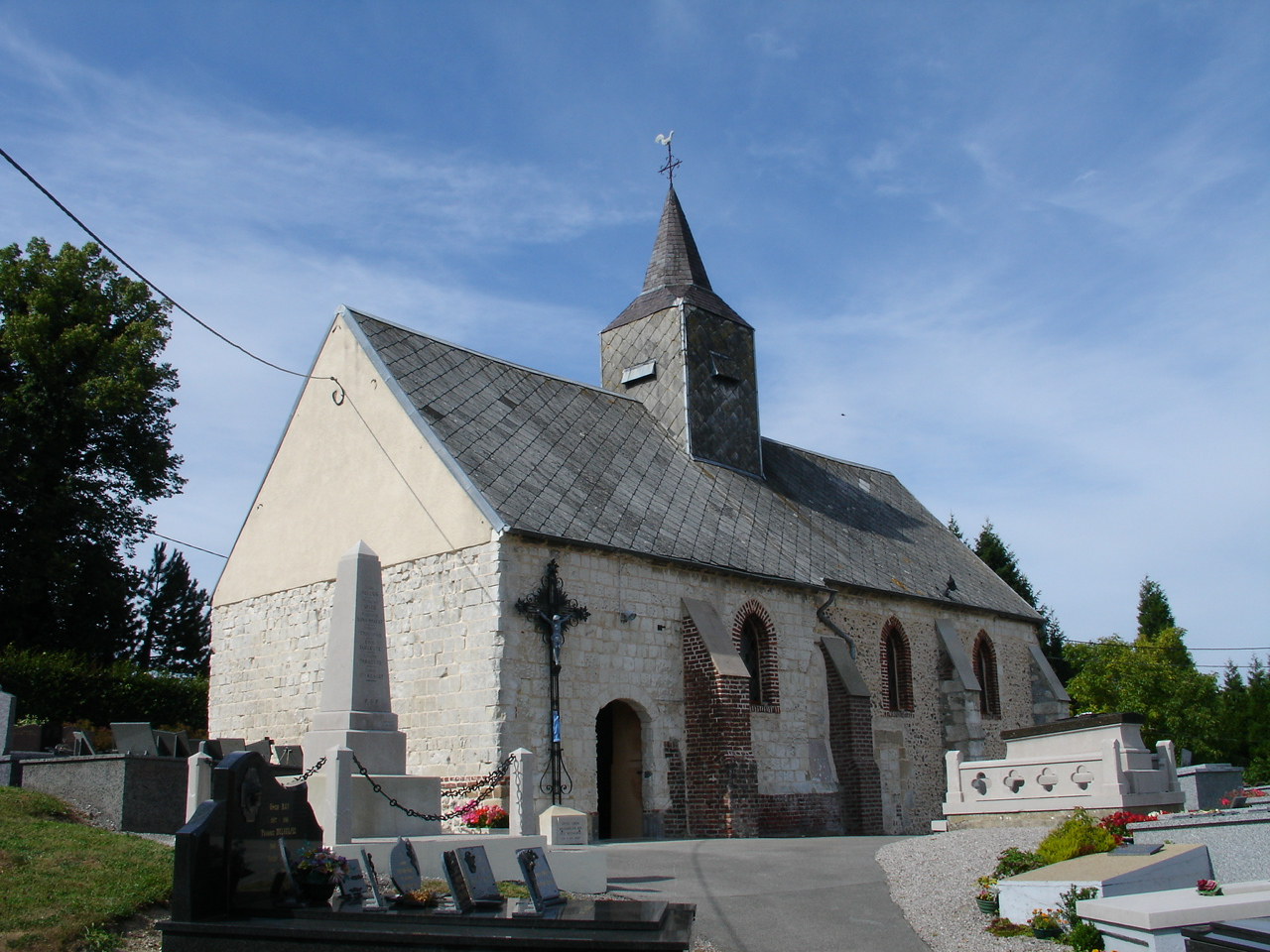
- The church of Bainghen

- Coat of arms
- Location of Bainghen
- Location within France Location within Hauts-de-France
- Coordinates: 50°45′08″N 1°54′28″E
- Country: France
- Region: Hauts-de-France
- Department: Pas-de-Calais
- Arrondissement: Calais
- Canton: Calais-2
- Intercommunality: CC Pays d'Opale

Government
  - Mayor (2020–2026): Thierry Terlutte
- Area^{1}: 6.69 km^{2} (2.58 sq mi)
- Elevation: 200 m (660 ft)
- Highest elevation: 202 m (663 ft)
- Lowest elevation: 77 m (253 ft)
- Population (2023): 208
  - Density: 31.1/km^{2} (80.5/sq mi)
- Time zone: UTC+01:00 (CET)
  - Summer (DST): UTC+02:00 (CEST)
- INSEE/Postal code: 62076 /62850
- ^{1} French Land Register data, which excludes lakes, ponds, glaciers > 1 km^{2} (0.386 sq mi or 247 acres) and river estuaries.

Bainghen (French pronunciation: [bɛ̃ɡɑ̃]; Dutch: Baiengem) is a commune in the Pas-de-Calais department in the Hauts-de-France region of France.

== Geography ==
A small farming commune, some 14 miles (23 km) east of Boulogne, at the junction of the D206 and the D206e roads.

== Population ==
Historical population
Year	Pop.	±% p.a.
1968	135	—
1975	130	−0.54%
1982	122	−0.90%
1990	135	+1.27%
1999	126	−0.76%
2007	155	+2.62%
2012	188	+3.94%
2017	227	+3.84%
2023	208	−1.45%
Source: INSEE

== Transport ==
The Chemin de fer de Boulogne à Bonningues (CF de BB) opened a station at Bainghen on 22 April 1900. Passenger services were withdrawn on 31 December 1935. They were reinstated in November 1942. The CF de BB closed in 1948.

== Sights ==
- The ruins of a feudal chateau.
- The church of St. Martin, dating from the eighteenth century.

== See also ==
- Communes of the Pas-de-Calais department
