= Landrethun-lès-Ardres =

- Commune
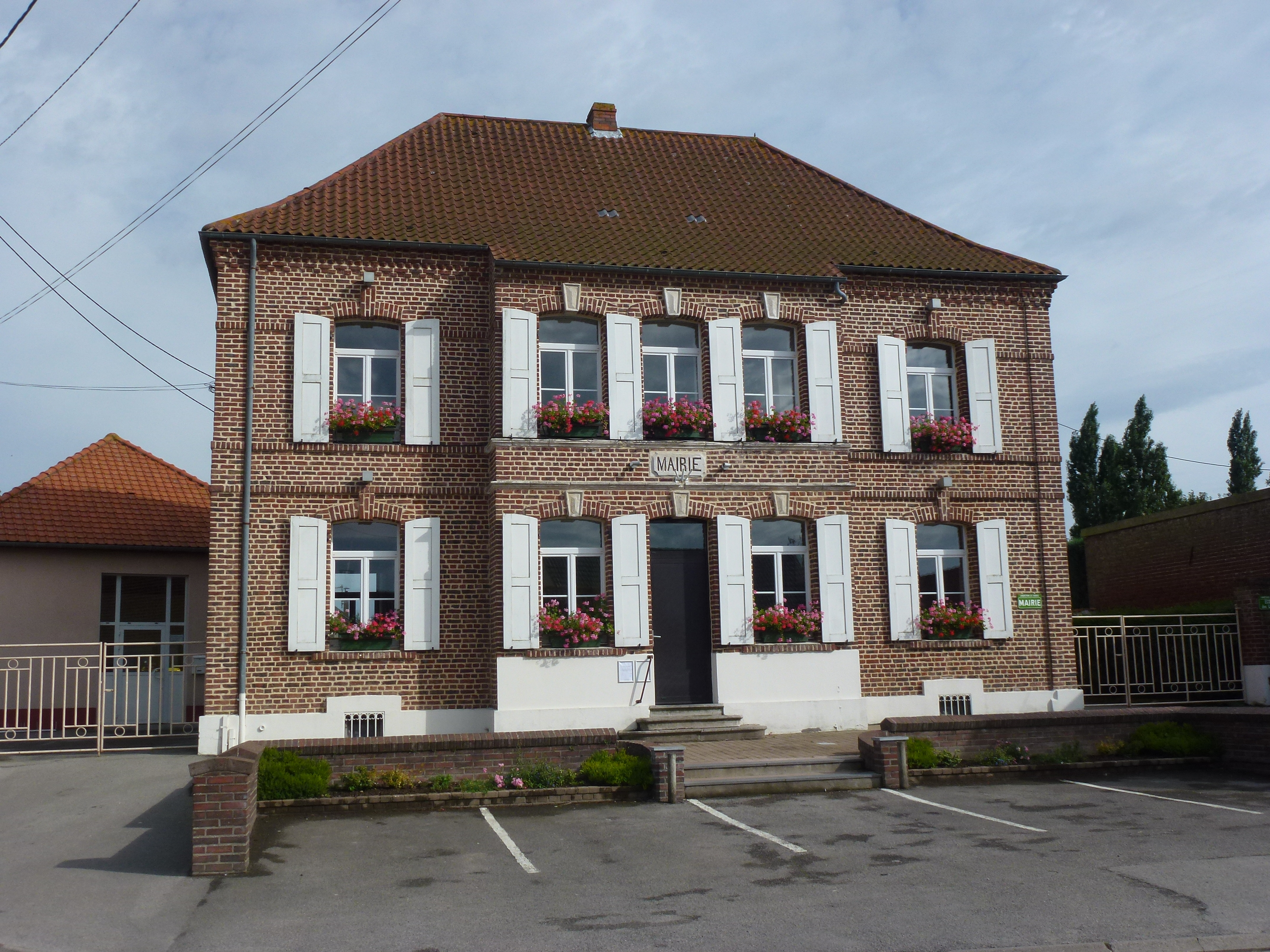
- The town hall of Landrethun-lès-Ardres

- Coat of arms
- Location of Landrethun-lès-Ardres
- Location within France Location within Hauts-de-France
- Coordinates: 50°49′32″N 1°57′38″E
- Country: France
- Region: Hauts-de-France
- Department: Pas-de-Calais
- Arrondissement: Calais
- Canton: Calais-2
- Intercommunality: CC Pays d'Opale

Government
  - Mayor (2020–2026): Gabriel Berly
- Area^{1}: 5.71 km^{2} (2.20 sq mi)
- Elevation: 85 m (279 ft)
- Highest elevation: 171 m (561 ft)
- Lowest elevation: 34 m (112 ft)
- Population (2023): 787
  - Density: 138/km^{2} (357/sq mi)
- Time zone: UTC+01:00 (CET)
  - Summer (DST): UTC+02:00 (CEST)
- INSEE/Postal code: 62488 /62610
- ^{1} French Land Register data, which excludes lakes, ponds, glaciers > 1 km^{2} (0.386 sq mi or 247 acres) and river estuaries.

Landrethun-lès-Ardres (French pronunciation: [lɑ̃dʁətœ̃ lɛ.z‿aʁdʁ], literally Landrethun near Ardres) is a commune in the Pas-de-Calais department in the Hauts-de-France region of France.

== Geography ==
A village situated 14 miles (23 km) northwest of Saint-Omer, on the D227 road.

== Population ==
Historical population
Year	Pop.	±% p.a.
1968	414	—
1975	399	−0.53%
1982	469	+2.34%
1990	568	+2.42%
1999	599	+0.59%
2007	681	+1.62%
2012	719	+1.09%
2017	753	+0.93%
2023	787	+0.74%
Source: INSEE

== Places of interest ==
- The church of St. Martin, dating from the nineteenth century.

== See also ==
- Communes of the Pas-de-Calais department
