= Fiennes, Pas-de-Calais =

Fiennes
- Commune
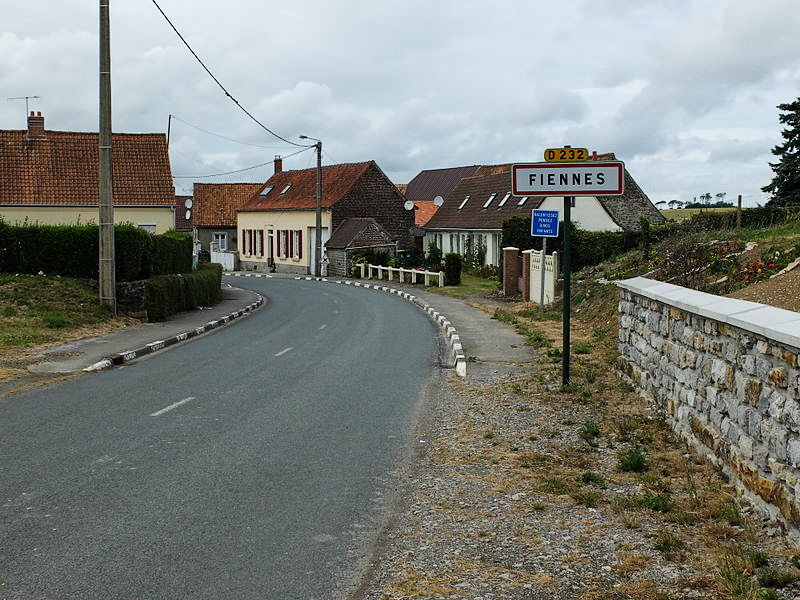
- The entrance to the commune

- Coat of arms
- Location of Fiennes
- Location within France Location within Hauts-de-France
- Coordinates: 50°49′38″N 1°49′33″E
- Country: France
- Region: Hauts-de-France
- Department: Pas-de-Calais
- Arrondissement: Calais
- Canton: Calais-2
- Intercommunality: CC Pays d'Opale

Government
  - Mayor (2020–2026): Eloi Bonningues
- Area^{1}: 11.64 km^{2} (4.49 sq mi)
- Elevation: 92 m (302 ft)
- Highest elevation: 166 m (545 ft)
- Lowest elevation: 71 m (233 ft)
- Population (2023): 850
  - Density: 73/km^{2} (190/sq mi)
- Time zone: UTC+01:00 (CET)
  - Summer (DST): UTC+02:00 (CEST)
- INSEE/Postal code: 62334 /62132
- ^{1} French Land Register data, which excludes lakes, ponds, glaciers > 1 km^{2} (0.386 sq mi or 247 acres) and river estuaries.

Fiennes (French pronunciation: [fjɛn]) is a commune in the Pas-de-Calais department in the Hauts-de-France region of France.

== Geography ==
A farming village located 16 km (10 miles) south of Calais, at the junction of the D250, D232 and D151 roads. It ranges from 71–166 meters above sea level, with an average elevation of around 92–106 meters.

== Population ==
Historical population
Year	Pop.	±% p.a.
1968	747	—
1975	682	−1.29%
1982	739	+1.15%
1990	760	+0.35%
1999	813	+0.75%
2007	859	+0.69%
2012	897	+0.87%
2017	891	−0.13%
2023	850	−0.78%
Source: INSEE

== Places of interest ==
- The church of St. Martin, dating from the fifteenth century.
- The ruins of a castle, originally destroyed in 1320, rebuilt and destroyed again in 1543

== See also ==
- Communes of the Pas-de-Calais department
