= Rodelinghem =

- Commune
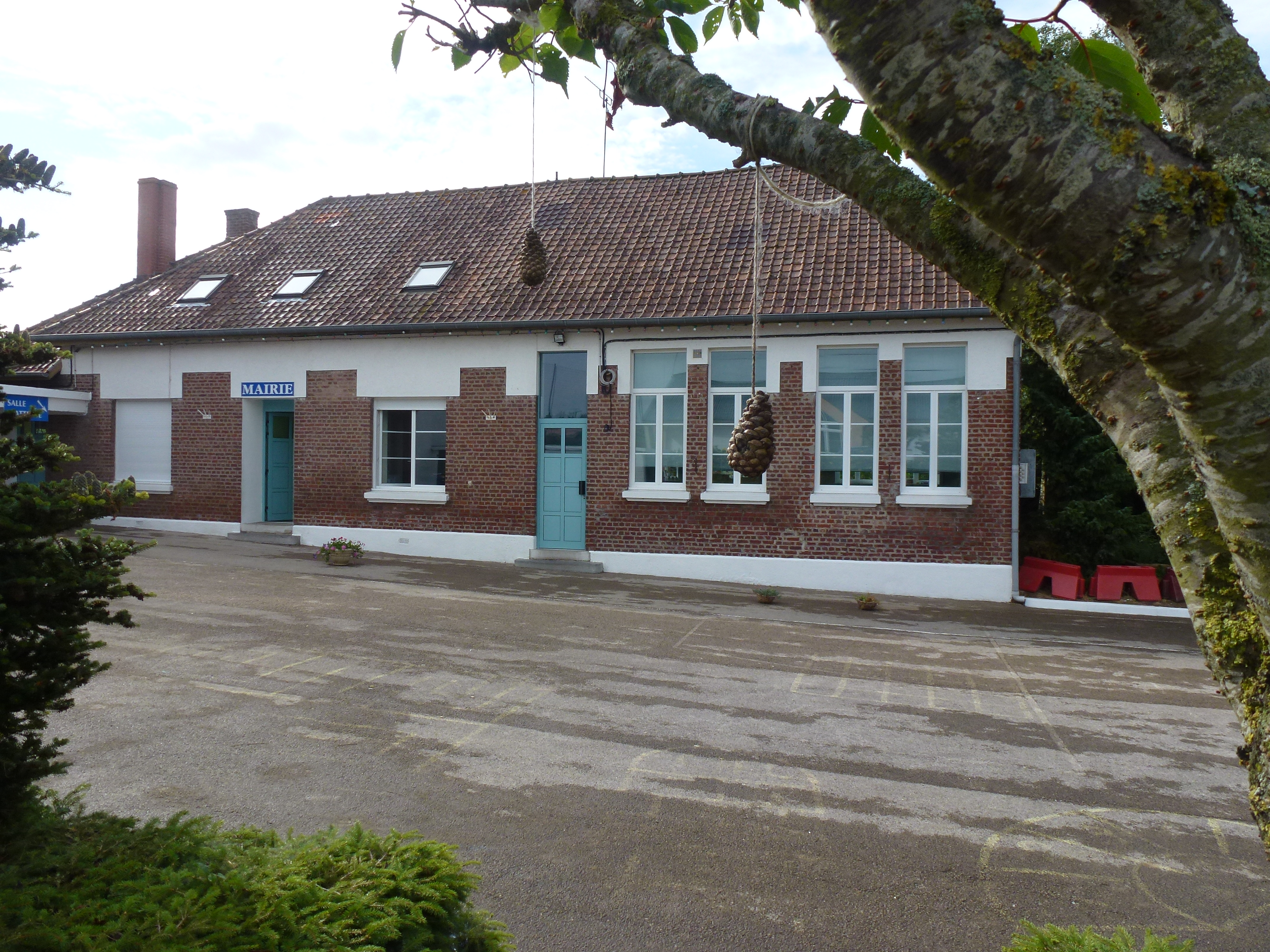
- The town hall of Rodelinghem

- Coat of arms
- Location of Rodelinghem
- Location within France Location within Hauts-de-France
- Coordinates: 50°50′20″N 1°55′46″E
- Country: France
- Region: Hauts-de-France
- Department: Pas-de-Calais
- Arrondissement: Calais
- Canton: Calais-2
- Intercommunality: CC Pays d'Opale

Government
  - Mayor (2020–2026): Guy Vasseur
- Area^{1}: 4.35 km^{2} (1.68 sq mi)
- Elevation: 25 m (82 ft)
- Highest elevation: 81 m (266 ft)
- Lowest elevation: 14 m (46 ft)
- Population (2023): 558
  - Density: 128/km^{2} (332/sq mi)
- Time zone: UTC+01:00 (CET)
  - Summer (DST): UTC+02:00 (CEST)
- INSEE/Postal code: 62716 /62610
- ^{1} French Land Register data, which excludes lakes, ponds, glaciers > 1 km^{2} (0.386 sq mi or 247 acres) and river estuaries.

Rodelinghem (French pronunciation: [ʁɔdlɛ̃ɡɑ̃]) is a commune in the Pas-de-Calais department in the Hauts-de-France region of France.

== Geography ==
Rodelinghem lies about 8 miles (13 km) south of Calais, on the D228 road.

== Population ==
Historical population
Year	Pop.	±% p.a.
1968	234	—
1975	229	−0.31%
1982	288	+3.33%
1990	373	+3.29%
1999	393	+0.58%
2007	520	+3.56%
2012	555	+1.31%
2017	528	−0.99%
2023	558	+0.93%
Source: INSEE

== Places of interest ==
- The church of St.Michel, dating from the seventeenth century.

== See also ==
- Communes of the Pas-de-Calais department
