= Autingues =

- Commune
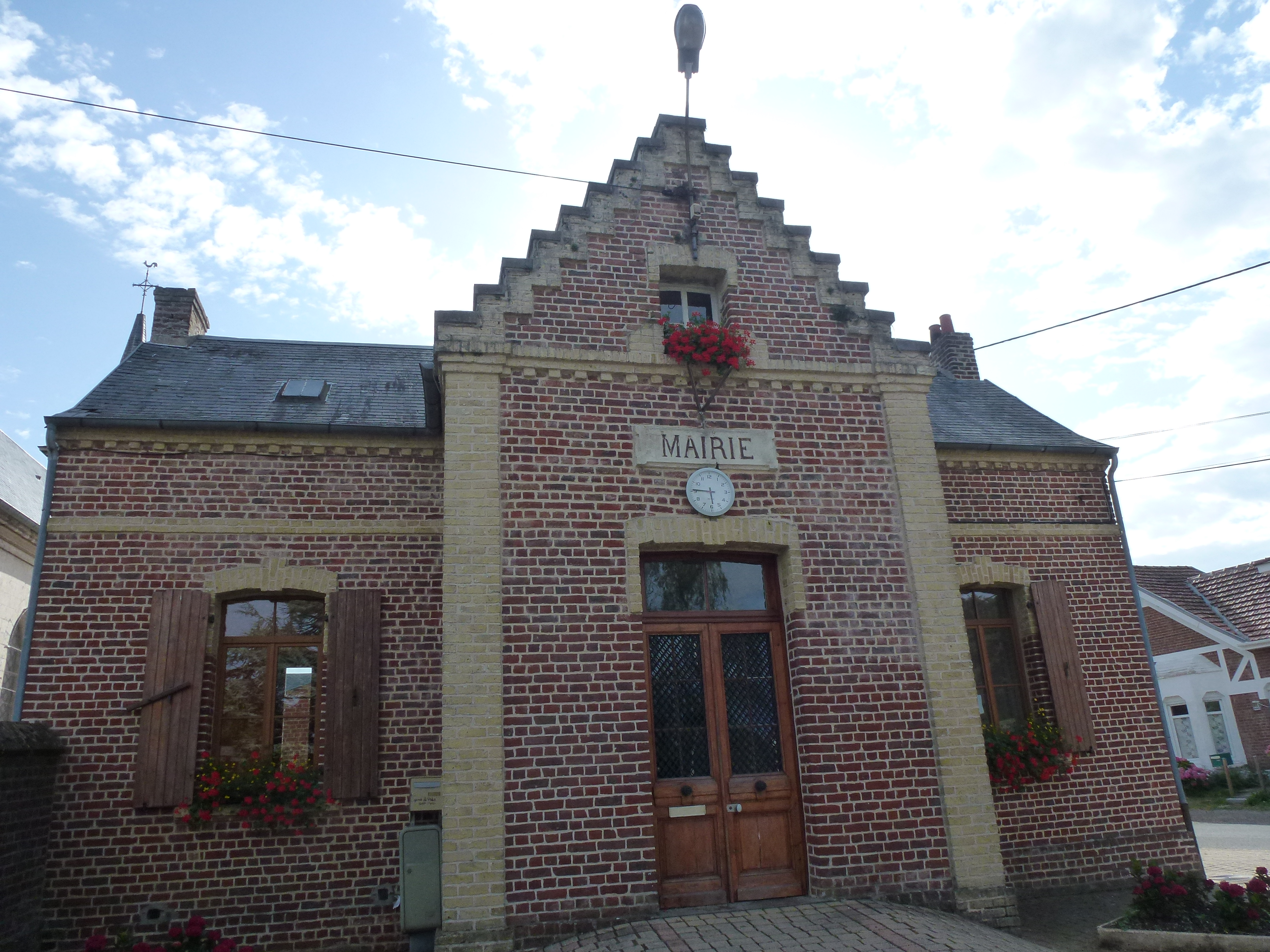
- The town hall of Autingues

- Coat of arms
- Location of Autingues
- Location within France Location within Hauts-de-France
- Coordinates: 50°50′19″N 1°58′45″E
- Country: France
- Region: Hauts-de-France
- Department: Pas-de-Calais
- Arrondissement: Calais
- Canton: Calais-2
- Intercommunality: CC Pays d'Opale

Government
  - Mayor (2020–2026): Blaise de Saint-Just d'Autingues
- Area^{1}: 2.97 km^{2} (1.15 sq mi)
- Elevation: 21 m (69 ft)
- Highest elevation: 45 m (148 ft)
- Lowest elevation: 4 m (13 ft)
- Population (2023): 293
  - Density: 98.7/km^{2} (256/sq mi)
- Time zone: UTC+01:00 (CET)
  - Summer (DST): UTC+02:00 (CEST)
- INSEE/Postal code: 62059 /62610
- ^{1} French Land Register data, which excludes lakes, ponds, glaciers > 1 km^{2} (0.386 sq mi or 247 acres) and river estuaries.

Autingues (French pronunciation: [otɛ̃ɡ]) is a commune in the Pas-de-Calais department in northern France 10 miles (16 km) southeast of Calais.

== Population ==
Historical population
Year	Pop.	±% p.a.
1968	182	—
1975	223	+2.94%
1982	230	+0.44%
1990	224	−0.33%
1999	255	+1.45%
2007	309	+2.43%
2012	287	−1.47%
2017	291	+0.28%
2023	293	+0.11%
Source: INSEE

== See also ==
- Communes of the Pas-de-Calais department
