= Andres, Pas-de-Calais =

Andres Anderne
- Commune
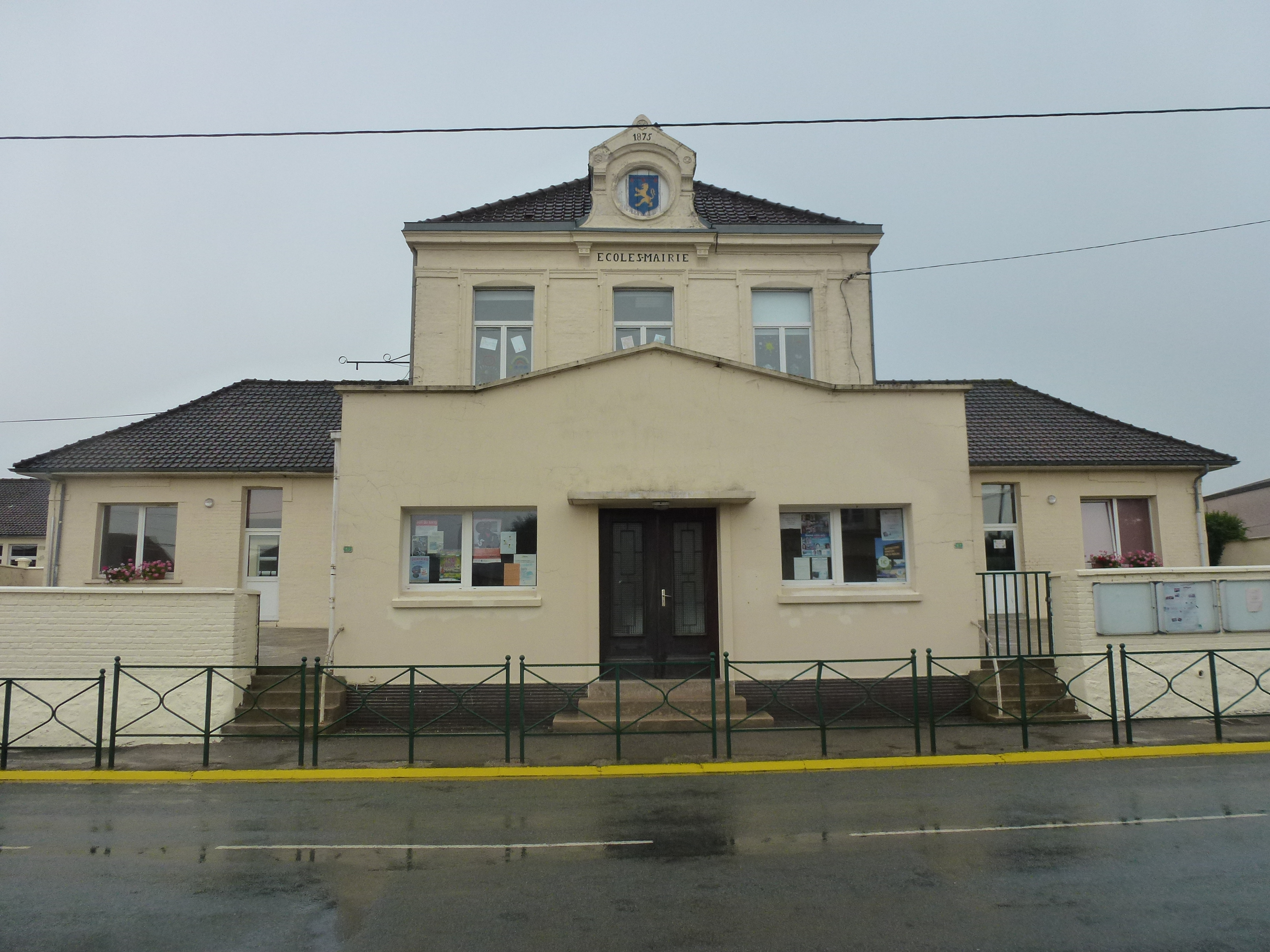
- The school and former town hall of Andres

- Coat of arms
- Location of Andres
- Location within France Location within Hauts-de-France
- Coordinates: 50°52′05″N 1°55′18″E
- Country: France
- Region: Hauts-de-France
- Department: Pas-de-Calais
- Arrondissement: Calais
- Canton: Calais-2
- Intercommunality: CC des Pays d'Opale

Government
  - Mayor (2021–2026): Allan Turpin
- Area^{1}: 7.15 km^{2} (2.76 sq mi)
- Elevation: 6 m (20 ft)
- Highest elevation: 34 m (112 ft)
- Lowest elevation: 1 m (3.3 ft)
- Population (2023): 1,523
  - Density: 213/km^{2} (552/sq mi)
- Time zone: UTC+01:00 (CET)
  - Summer (DST): UTC+02:00 (CEST)
- INSEE/Postal code: 62031 /62340
- ^{1} French Land Register data, which excludes lakes, ponds, glaciers > 1 km^{2} (0.386 sq mi or 247 acres) and river estuaries.

Andres (French pronunciation: [ɑ̃dʁ]; West Flemish: Anderne) is a commune in the Pas-de-Calais department in northern France.

== Geography ==
Andres is a farming village located 8 miles (13 km) southeast of Calais, at the junction of the D244 and D248 roads.

== Population ==
Historical population
Year	Pop.	±% p.a.
1968	759	—
1975	697	−1.21%
1982	1,007	+5.40%
1990	1,396	+4.17%
1999	1,445	+0.38%
2007	1,531	+0.73%
2012	1,524	−0.09%
2017	1,564	+0.52%
2023	1,523	−0.44%
Source: INSEE

== Sights ==
- The church of St. John, dating from the eighteenth century.
- The tower of an old windmill.

== Transport ==
The Chemin de fer d'Anvin à Calais opened a railway station at Andres in 1881. The railway was closed in 1955.

== See also ==
- Communes of the Pas-de-Calais department
