= Arrondissement of Calais =

Coordinates: 50°57′N 1°51′E

Calais
- Arrondissement
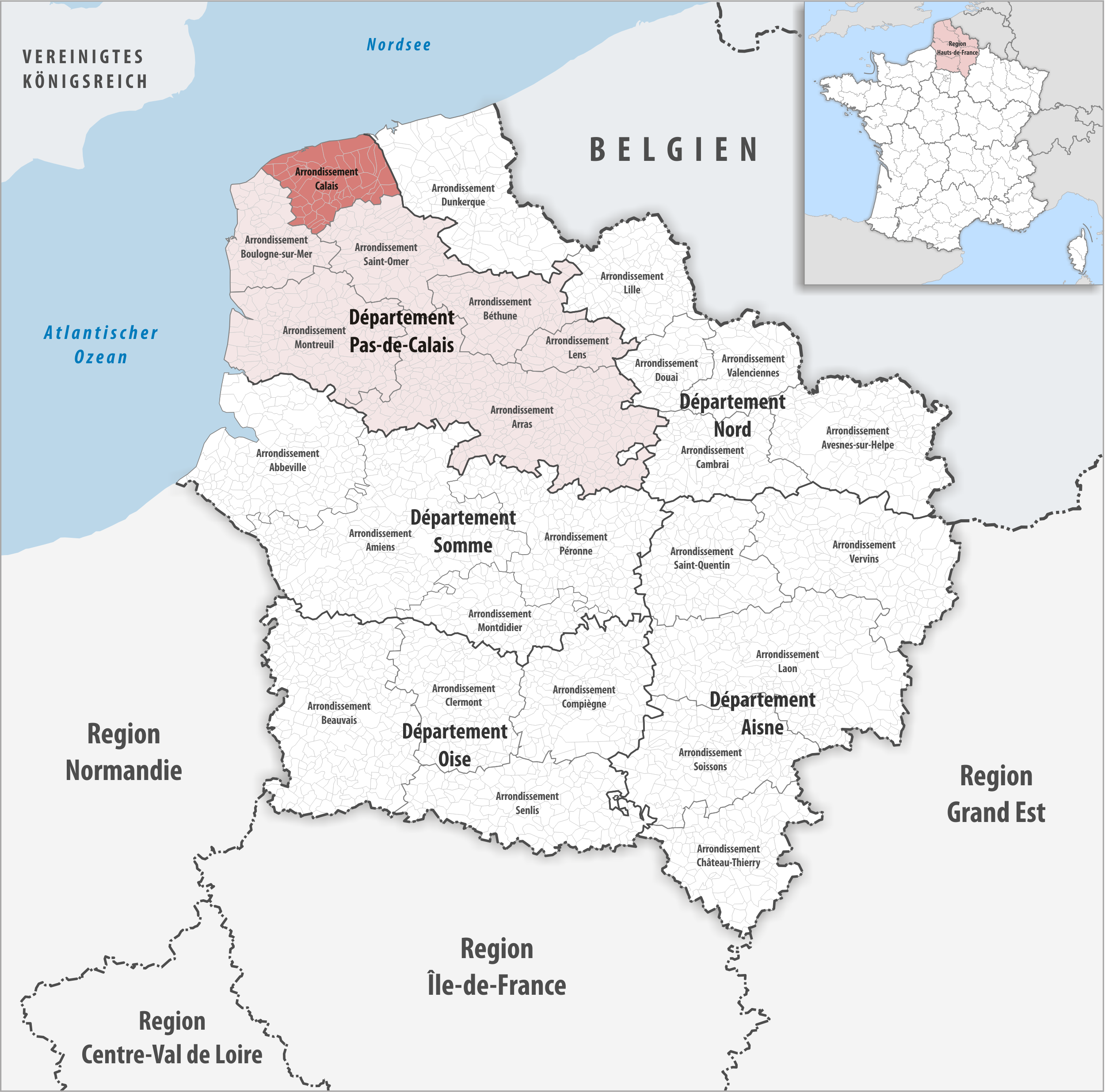
- Location within the region Hauts-de-France
- Country: France
- Region: Hauts-de-France
- Department: Pas-de-Calais
- No. of communes: {{{nbcomm}}}
- Area: 593.4 km^{2} (229.1 sq mi)
- Population (2023): 152,245
  - Density: 256.6/km^{2} (664.5/sq mi)
- INSEE code: 626

The Arrondissement of Calais is an arrondissement of France in the Pas-de-Calais department in the Hauts-de-France region. It has 52 communes. Its population is 152,091 (2021), and its area is 593.4 km^{2} (229.1 sq mi).

== Composition ==
The communes of the arrondissement of Calais, and their INSEE codes, are:

1. Alembon (62020)
2. Andres (62031)
3. Ardres (62038)
4. Les Attaques (62043)
5. Audruicq (62057)
6. Autingues (62059)
7. Bainghen (62076)
8. Balinghem (62078)
9. Bonningues-lès-Calais (62156)
10. Bouquehault (62161)
11. Boursin (62167)
12. Brêmes (62174)
13. Caffiers (62191)
14. Calais (62193)
15. Campagne-lès-Guines (62203)
16. Coquelles (62239)
17. Coulogne (62244)
18. Escalles (62307)
19. Fiennes (62334)
20. Fréthun (62360)
21. Guemps (62393)
22. Guînes (62397)
23. Hames-Boucres (62408)
24. Hardinghen (62412)
25. Herbinghen (62432)
26. Hermelinghen (62439)
27. Hocquinghen (62455)
28. Landrethun-lès-Ardres (62488)
29. Licques (62506)
30. Louches (62531)
31. Marck (62548)
32. Muncq-Nieurlet (62598)
33. Nielles-lès-Ardres (62614)
34. Nielles-lès-Calais (62615)
35. Nortkerque (62621)
36. Nouvelle-Église (62623)
37. Offekerque (62634)
38. Oye-Plage (62645)
39. Peuplingues (62654)
40. Pihen-lès-Guînes (62657)
41. Polincove (62662)
42. Recques-sur-Hem (62699)
43. Rodelinghem (62716)
44. Ruminghem (62730)
45. Sainte-Marie-Kerque (62756)
46. Saint-Folquin (62748)
47. Saint-Omer-Capelle (62766)
48. Saint-Tricat (62769)
49. Sangatte (62774)
50. Sanghen (62775)
51. Vieille-Église (62852)
52. Zutkerque (62906)

== History ==
The arrondissement of Calais was created in 1962 from part of the arrondissement of Boulogne-sur-Mer. At the January 2017 reorganisation of the arrondissements of Pas-de-Calais, it gained one commune from the arrondissement of Boulogne-sur-Mer and 23 communes from the arrondissement of Saint-Omer.

As a result of the reorganisation of the cantons of France which came into effect in 2015, the borders of the cantons are no longer related to the borders of the arrondissements. The cantons of the arrondissement of Calais were, as of January 2015:

1. Calais-Centre
2. Calais-Est
3. Calais-Nord-Ouest
4. Calais-Sud-Est
5. Guînes
