= Brêmes =

- Commune
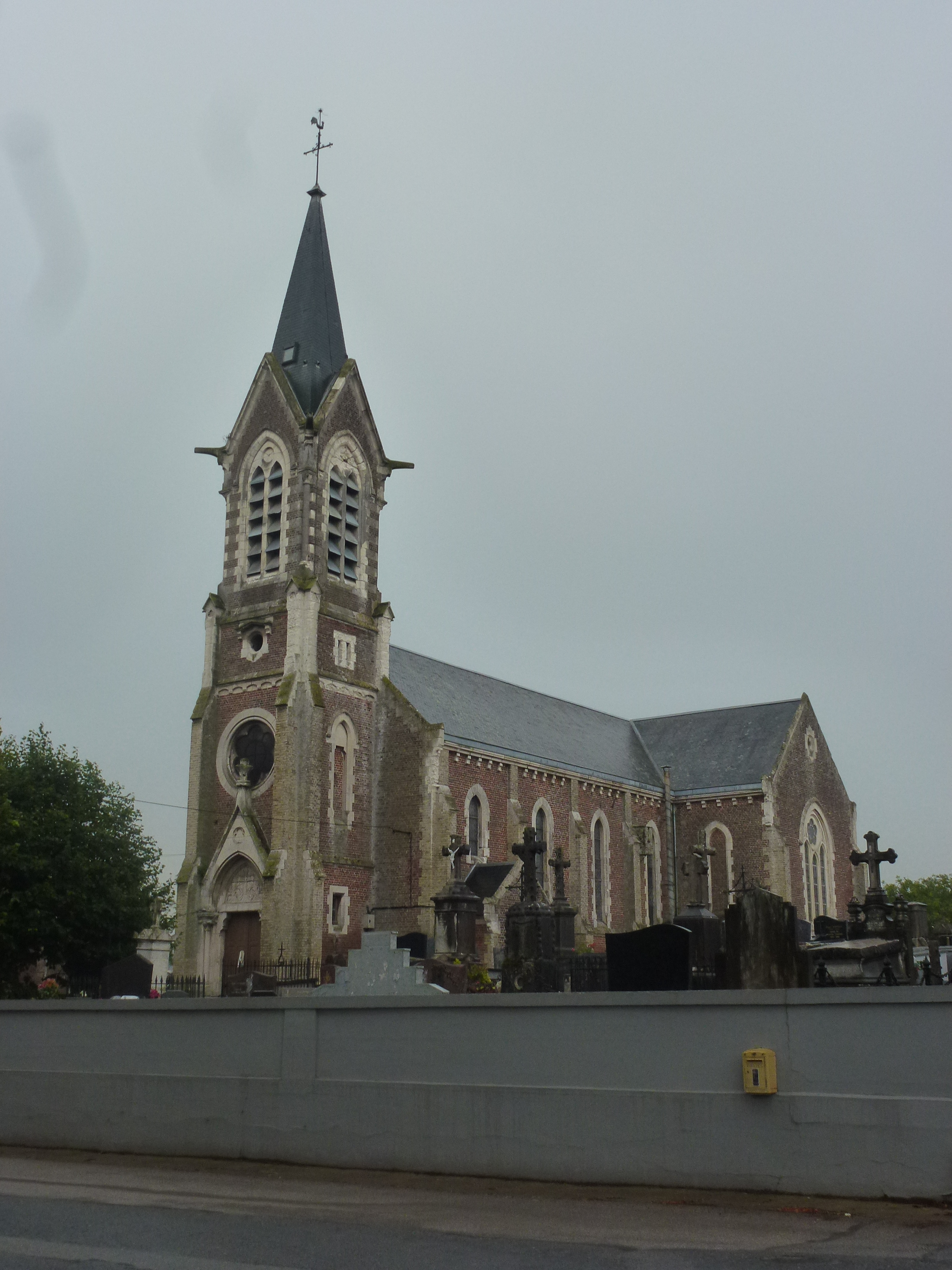
- The church of Brêmes

- Coat of arms
- Location of Brêmes
- Location within France Location within Hauts-de-France
- Coordinates: 50°51′20″N 1°58′14″E
- Country: France
- Region: Hauts-de-France
- Department: Pas-de-Calais
- Arrondissement: Calais
- Canton: Calais-2
- Intercommunality: CC Pays d'Opale

Government
  - Mayor (2020–2026): Thierry Poussière
- Area^{1}: 7.25 km^{2} (2.80 sq mi)
- Elevation: 60 m (200 ft)
- Highest elevation: 76 m (249 ft)
- Lowest elevation: 3 m (9.8 ft)
- Population (2023): 1,324
  - Density: 183/km^{2} (473/sq mi)
- Time zone: UTC+01:00 (CET)
  - Summer (DST): UTC+02:00 (CEST)
- INSEE/Postal code: 62174 /62610
- ^{1} French Land Register data, which excludes lakes, ponds, glaciers > 1 km^{2} (0.386 sq mi or 247 acres) and river estuaries.

Brêmes (French pronunciation: [bʁɛm]) is a commune in the Pas-de-Calais department in the Hauts-de-France region in northern France.

== Geography ==
A village situated 10 miles (16 km) south of Calais, on the D213 road. Surrounded by water, including the lake of Brêmes.

== Population ==
Historical population
Year	Pop.	±% p.a.
1968	855	—
1975	873	+0.30%
1982	1,067	+2.91%
1990	1,264	+2.14%
1999	1,315	+0.44%
2007	1,311	−0.04%
2012	1,308	−0.05%
2017	1,290	−0.28%
2023	1,324	+0.43%
Source: INSEE

== Sights ==
- The church of the St. Martin, dating from the late 19th century.
- The ruins of a watermill.

== Transport ==
The Chemin de fer d'Anvin à Calais opened a railway station at Guînes in 1881. The railway was closed in 1955.

== See also ==
- Communes of the Pas-de-Calais department
