= Louches =

- Commune
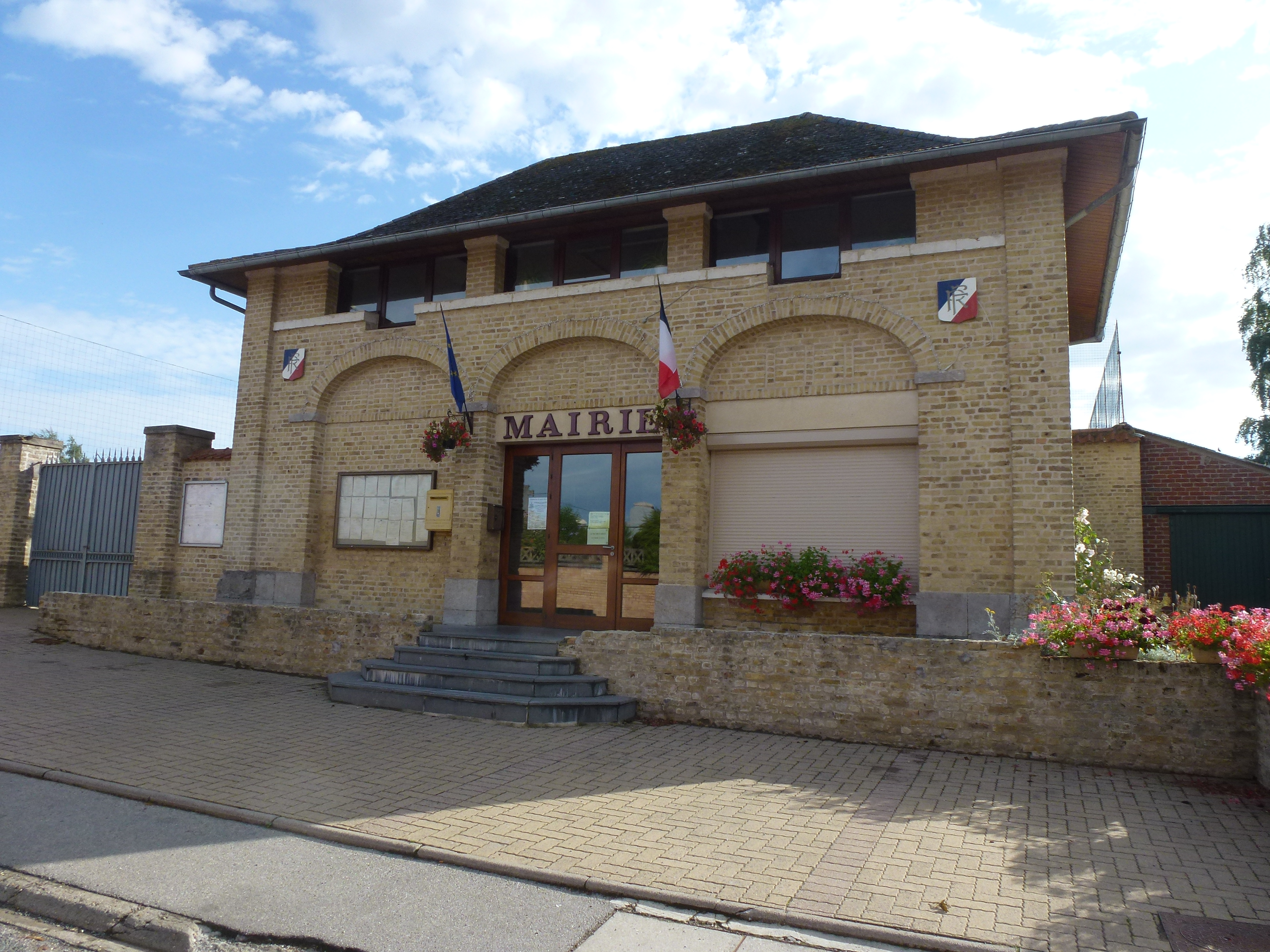
- The town hall of Louches
- Location of Louches
- Location within France Location within Hauts-de-France
- Coordinates: 50°49′50″N 2°00′26″E
- Country: France
- Region: Hauts-de-France
- Department: Pas-de-Calais
- Arrondissement: Calais
- Canton: Calais-2
- Intercommunality: CC Pays d'Opale

Government
  - Mayor (2020–2026): Franck Delabasserue
- Area^{1}: 12.83 km^{2} (4.95 sq mi)
- Elevation: 26 m (85 ft)
- Highest elevation: 166 m (545 ft)
- Lowest elevation: 8 m (26 ft)
- Population (2023): 947
  - Density: 73.8/km^{2} (191/sq mi)
- Time zone: UTC+01:00 (CET)
  - Summer (DST): UTC+02:00 (CEST)
- INSEE/Postal code: 62531 /62610
- ^{1} French Land Register data, which excludes lakes, ponds, glaciers > 1 km^{2} (0.386 sq mi or 247 acres) and river estuaries.

Louches (French pronunciation: [luʃ]) is a commune in the Pas-de-Calais department in the Hauts-de-France region of France.

== Geography ==
A village some 12 miles (19 km) southeast of Calais, on the D225 road.

== Population ==
Historical population
Year	Pop.	±% p.a.
1968	696	—
1975	701	+0.10%
1982	677	−0.50%
1990	722	+0.81%
1999	733	+0.17%
2007	853	+1.91%
2012	943	+2.03%
2017	960	+0.36%
2023	947	−0.23%
Source: INSEE

== Places of interest ==
- The church of St.Omer, dating from the seventeenth century.

== Transport ==
The Chemin de fer d'Anvin à Calais opened a railway station at Louches in 1881. The railway was closed in 1955.

== See also ==
- Communes of the Pas-de-Calais department
