= Canton of Calais-2 =

Coordinates: 50.94°N 1.89°E

The canton of Calais-2 is an administrative division of the Pas-de-Calais department in northern France. It was created at the French canton reorganisation which came into effect in March 2015. Its seat is in Calais.

It consists of the following communes:

1. Alembon
2. Andres
3. Ardres
4. Les Attaques
5. Autingues
6. Bainghen
7. Balinghem
8. Bouquehault
9. Boursin
10. Brêmes
11. Caffiers
12. Calais (partly)
13. Campagne-lès-Guines
14. Coulogne
15. Fiennes
16. Guînes
17. Hardinghen
18. Herbinghen
19. Hermelinghen
20. Hocquinghen
21. Landrethun-lès-Ardres
22. Licques
23. Louches
24. Nielles-lès-Ardres
25. Rodelinghem
26. Sanghen
