= Bouquehault =

- Commune
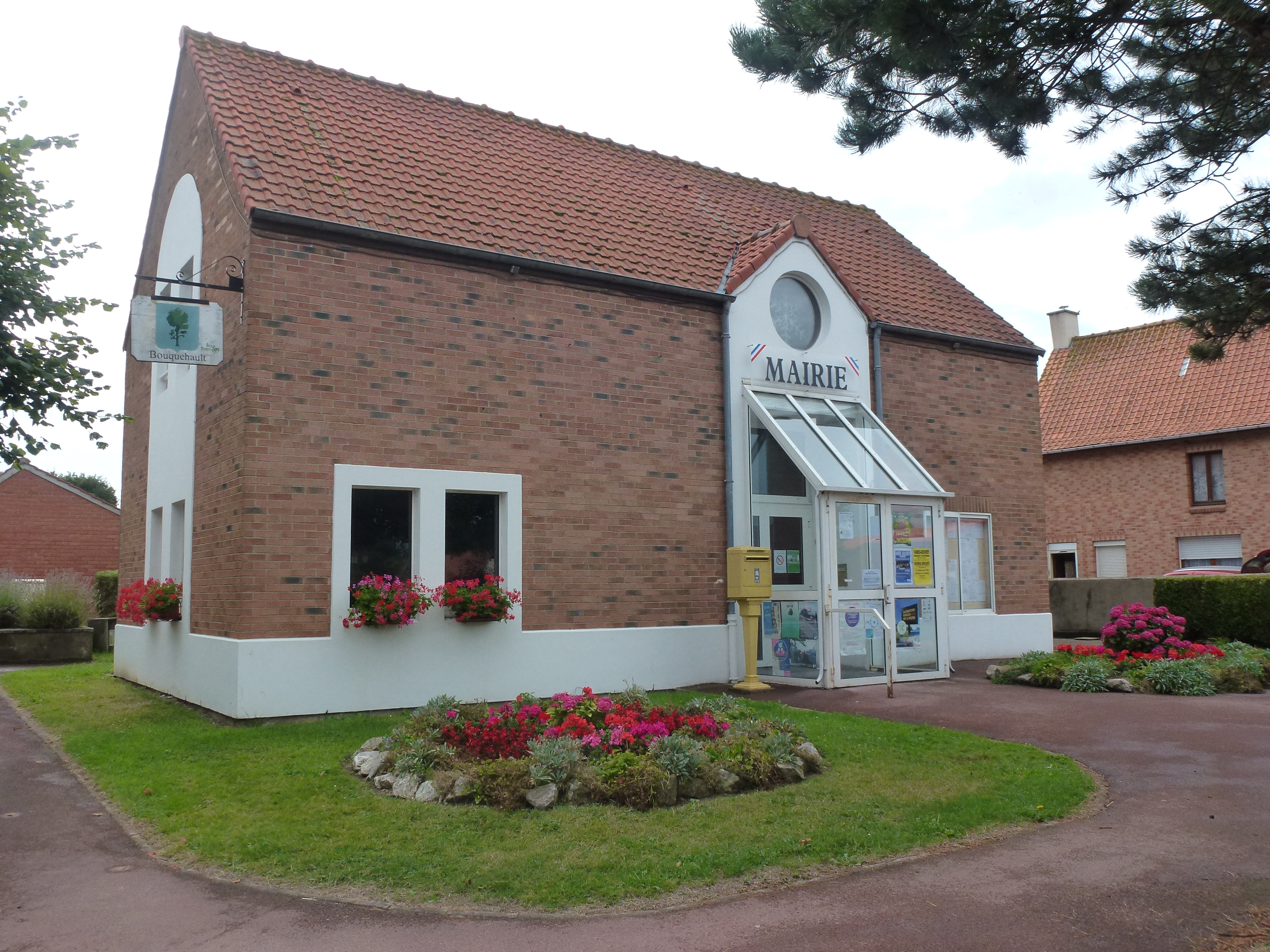
- The town hall of Bouquehault

- Coat of arms
- Location of Bouquehault
- Location within France Location within Hauts-de-France
- Coordinates: 50°49′38″N 1°54′15″E
- Country: France
- Region: Hauts-de-France
- Department: Pas-de-Calais
- Arrondissement: Calais
- Canton: Calais-2
- Intercommunality: CC Pays d'Opale

Government
  - Mayor (2020–2026): Lucien Melin
- Area^{1}: 8.04 km^{2} (3.10 sq mi)
- Elevation: 58 m (190 ft)
- Highest elevation: 181 m (594 ft)
- Lowest elevation: 44 m (144 ft)
- Population (2023): 788
  - Density: 98.0/km^{2} (254/sq mi)
- Time zone: UTC+01:00 (CET)
  - Summer (DST): UTC+02:00 (CEST)
- INSEE/Postal code: 62161 /62340
- ^{1} French Land Register data, which excludes lakes, ponds, glaciers > 1 km^{2} (0.386 sq mi or 247 acres) and river estuaries.

Bouquehault (French pronunciation: [buk(ə)o]; Picard: Boucault; Dutch: Beukholt) is a commune in the Pas-de-Calais department in the Hauts-de-France region in northern France.

== Geography ==
A farming village located 10 miles (16 km) south of Calais, on the D248 road.

== Politics ==
François Noël served as Mayor from 2014 to 2020.

Lucien Melin is the current Mayor since 2020.

== Population ==
Historical population
Year	Pop.	±% p.a.
1968	480	—
1975	450	−0.92%
1982	488	+1.16%
1990	529	+1.01%
1999	567	+0.77%
2007	674	+2.18%
2012	711	+1.07%
2017	765	+1.47%
2023	788	+0.49%
Source: INSEE

== Sights ==
- The church of St. Omer, dating from the sixteenth century.
- The nineteenth century Château de Dippendal.
- The remains of an old château.
- A ruined windmill, built in 1868.

== See also ==
- Communes of the Pas-de-Calais department
