= Hardinghen =

Hardinghen Hardingen
- Commune
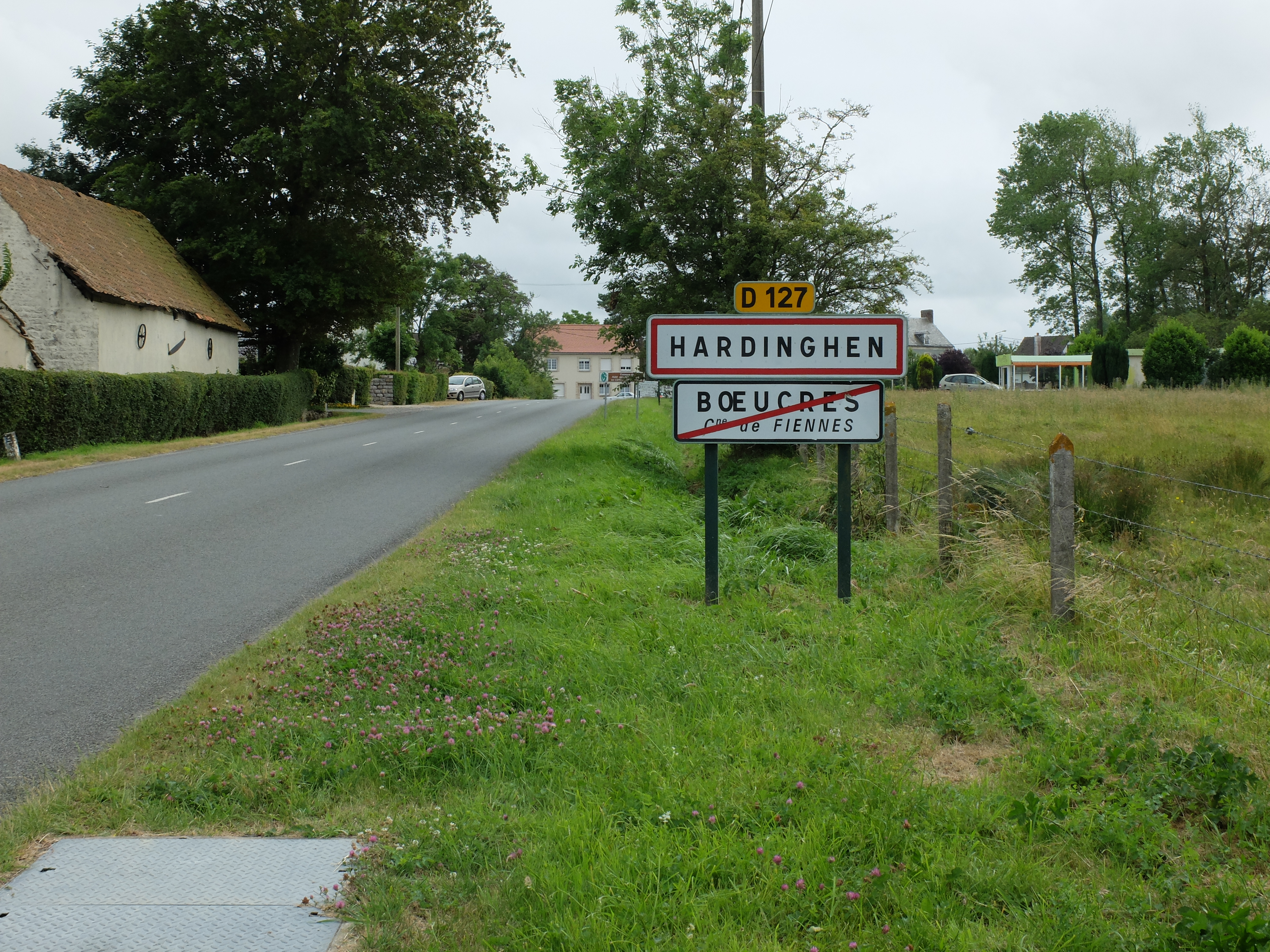
- The road into Hardinghen

- Coat of arms
- Location of Hardinghen
- Location within France Location within Hauts-de-France
- Coordinates: 50°48′39″N 1°49′21″E
- Country: France
- Region: Hauts-de-France
- Department: Pas-de-Calais
- Arrondissement: Calais
- Canton: Calais-2
- Intercommunality: CC Pays d'Opale

Government
  - Mayor (2020–2026): Nathalie Telliez
- Area^{1}: 8.24 km^{2} (3.18 sq mi)
- Elevation: 70 m (230 ft)
- Highest elevation: 176 m (577 ft)
- Lowest elevation: 48 m (157 ft)
- Population (2023): 1,270
  - Density: 154/km^{2} (399/sq mi)
- Time zone: UTC+01:00 (CET)
  - Summer (DST): UTC+02:00 (CEST)
- INSEE/Postal code: 62412 /62132
- ^{1} French Land Register data, which excludes lakes, ponds, glaciers > 1 km^{2} (0.386 sq mi or 247 acres) and river estuaries.

Hardinghen (French pronunciation: [aʁdɛ̃ɡɑ̃]; West Flemish: Hardingen) is a commune in the Pas-de-Calais department in the Hauts-de-France region of France 12 miles (18 km) south of Calais.

== Population ==
Historical population
Year	Pop.	±% p.a.
1968	1,089	—
1975	1,084	−0.07%
1982	1,056	−0.37%
1990	1,013	−0.52%
1999	1,008	−0.05%
2007	1,063	+0.67%
2012	1,163	+1.81%
2017	1,210	+0.80%
2023	1,270	+0.81%
Source: INSEE
