= Boursin =

- Commune
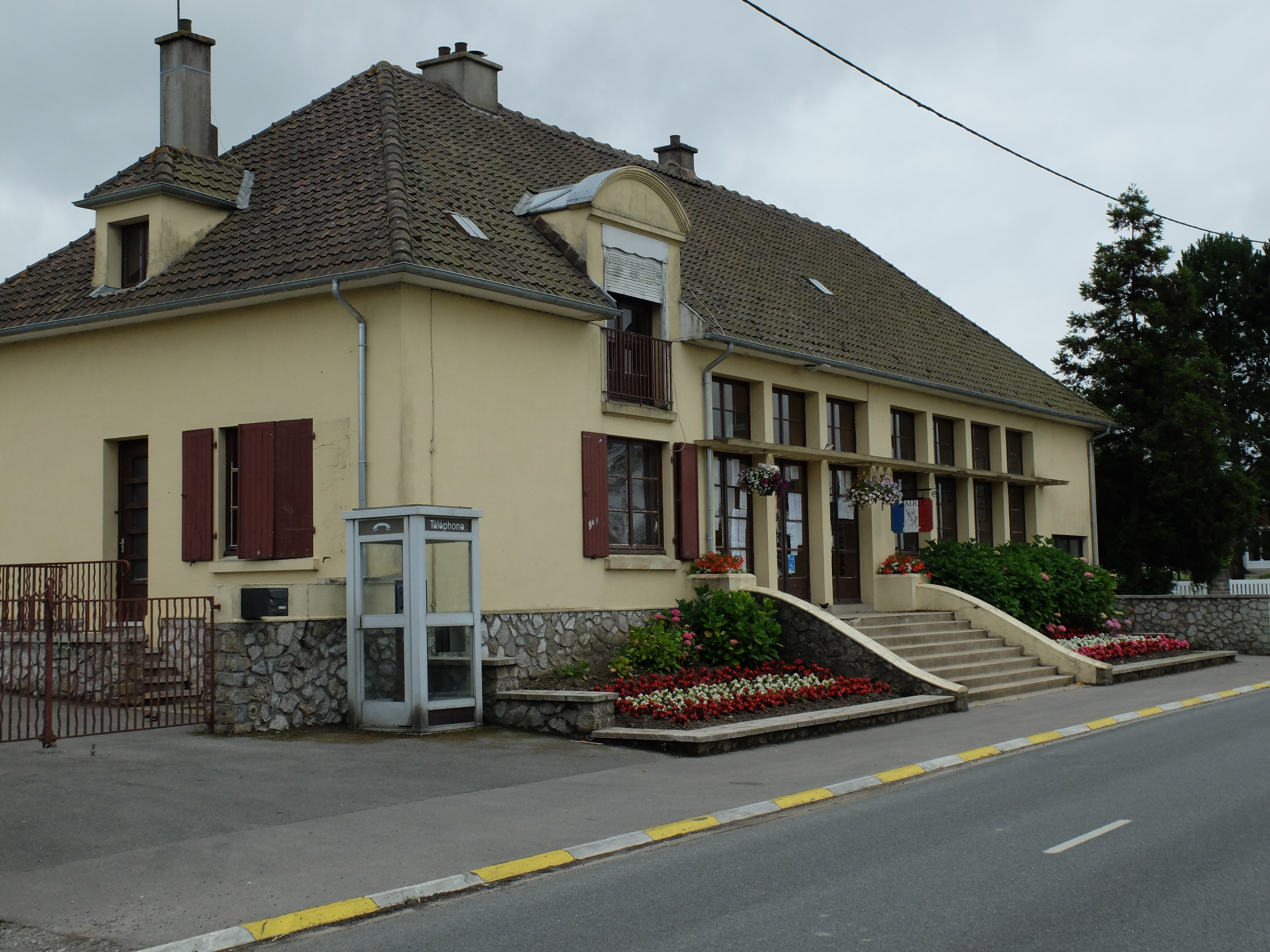
- The town hall of Boursin

- Coat of arms
- Location of Boursin
- Location within France Location within Hauts-de-France
- Coordinates: 50°46′38″N 1°50′08″E
- Country: France
- Region: Hauts-de-France
- Department: Pas-de-Calais
- Arrondissement: Calais
- Canton: Calais-2
- Intercommunality: CC Pays d'Opale

Government
  - Mayor (2020–2026): Claude Kidad
- Area^{1}: 7.58 km^{2} (2.93 sq mi)
- Elevation: 104 m (341 ft)
- Highest elevation: 196 m (643 ft)
- Lowest elevation: 46 m (151 ft)
- Population (2023): 236
  - Density: 31.1/km^{2} (80.6/sq mi)
- Time zone: UTC+01:00 (CET)
  - Summer (DST): UTC+02:00 (CEST)
- INSEE/Postal code: 62167 /62132
- ^{1} French Land Register data, which excludes lakes, ponds, glaciers > 1 km^{2} (0.386 sq mi or 247 acres) and river estuaries.

Boursin (French pronunciation: [buʁsɛ̃]) is a commune in the Pas-de-Calais department in the northern Hauts-de-France region of France 12 miles (19 km) south of Calais.

== Population ==
Historical population
Year	Pop.	±% p.a.
1968	168	—
1975	156	−1.05%
1982	158	+0.18%
1990	157	−0.08%
1999	182	+1.66%
2007	244	+3.73%
2012	275	+2.42%
2017	255	−1.50%
2023	236	−1.28%
Source: INSEE

== See also ==
- Communes of the Pas-de-Calais department
