= Herbinghen =

- Commune
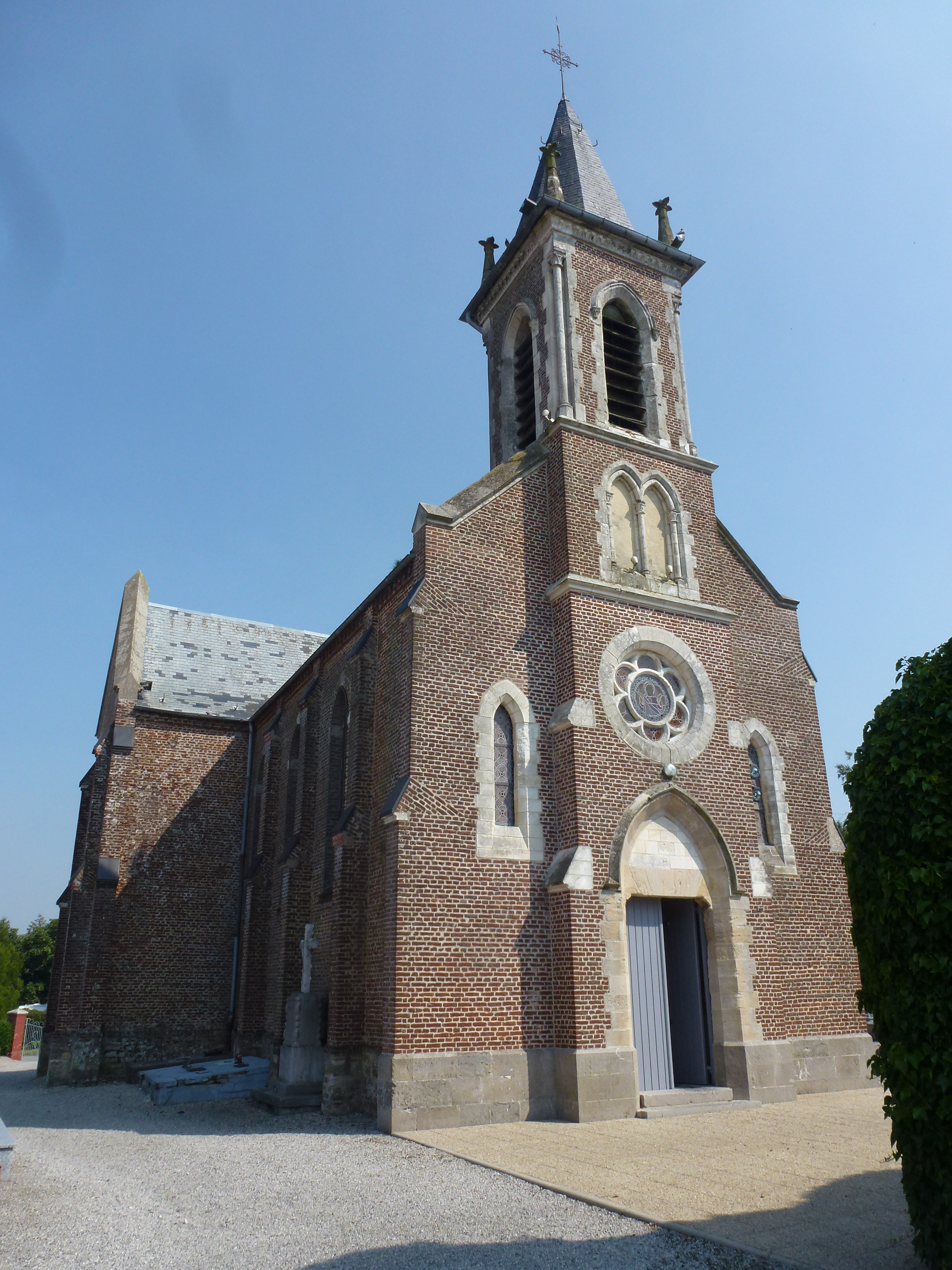
- The church of Herbinghen

- Coat of arms
- Location of Herbinghen
- Location within France Location within Hauts-de-France
- Coordinates: 50°46′25″N 1°54′45″E
- Country: France
- Region: Hauts-de-France
- Department: Pas-de-Calais
- Arrondissement: Calais
- Canton: Calais-2
- Intercommunality: CC Pays d'Opale

Government
  - Mayor (2020–2026): Marie-Andrée Rohart
- Area^{1}: 4.31 km^{2} (1.66 sq mi)
- Elevation: 95 m (312 ft)
- Highest elevation: 199 m (653 ft)
- Lowest elevation: 76 m (249 ft)
- Population (2023): 415
  - Density: 96.3/km^{2} (249/sq mi)
- Time zone: UTC+01:00 (CET)
  - Summer (DST): UTC+02:00 (CEST)
- INSEE/Postal code: 62432 /62850
- ^{1} French Land Register data, which excludes lakes, ponds, glaciers > 1 km^{2} (0.386 sq mi or 247 acres) and river estuaries.

Herbinghen (French pronunciation: [ɛʁbɛ̃ɡɑ̃]; Dutch: Herbingen) is a commune in the Pas-de-Calais department in the Hauts-de-France region of France 13 miles (19 km) south of Calais.

== Population ==
Historical population
Year	Pop.	±% p.a.
1968	259	—
1975	251	−0.45%
1982	297	+2.43%
1990	306	+0.37%
1999	319	+0.46%
2007	361	+1.56%
2012	385	+1.30%
2017	378	−0.37%
2023	415	+1.57%
Source: INSEE

== Transport ==
The Chemin de fer de Boulogne à Bonningues (CF de BB) opened a station serving Herbingen and Hocquinghen on 22 April 1900. Passenger services were withdrawn on 31 December 1935. They were reinstated in November 1942. The CF de BB closed in 1948.

== See also ==
- Communes of the Pas-de-Calais department
