= Rebergues =

Rebergues Rosberge
- Commune
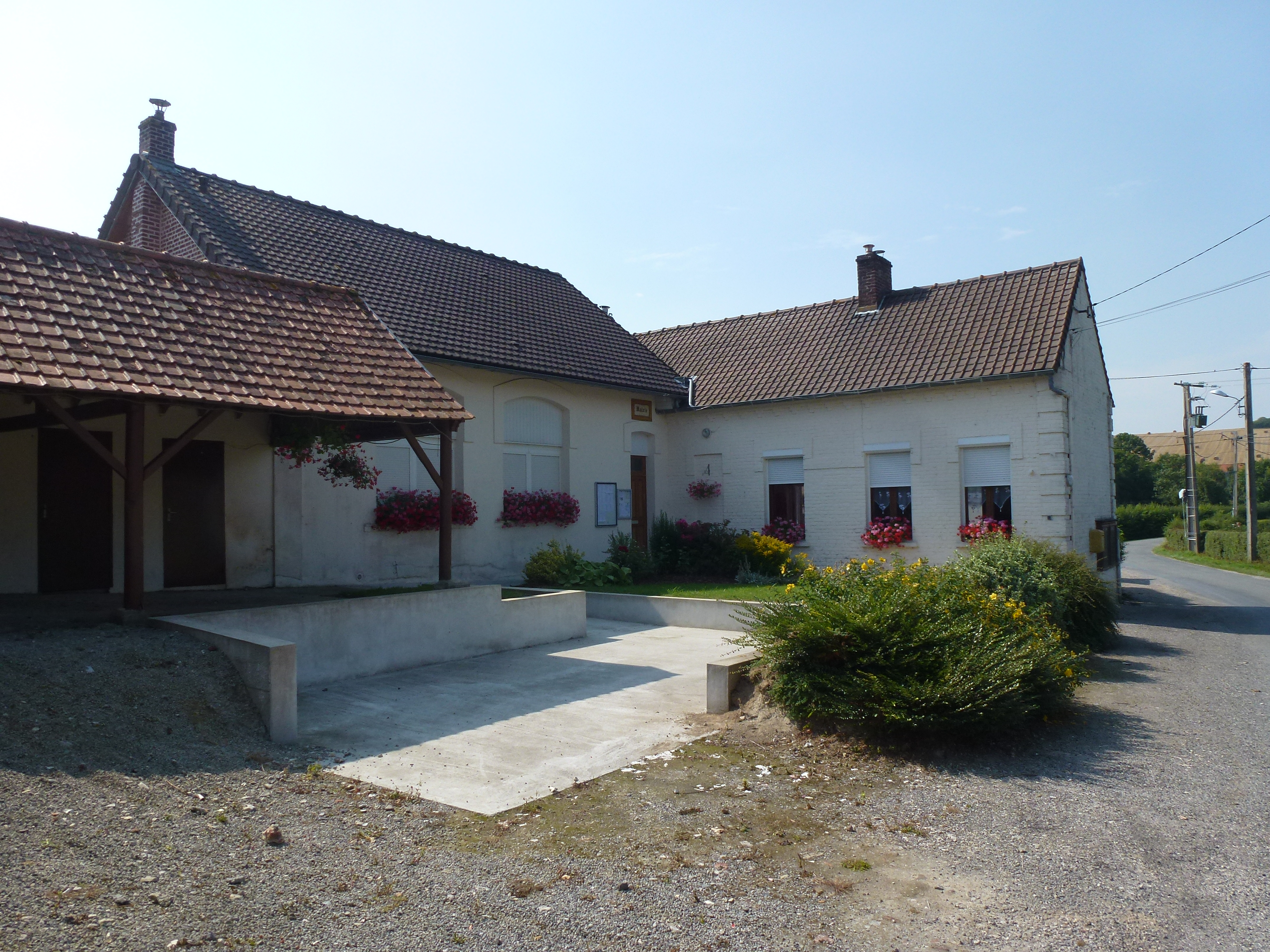
- The town hall of Rebergues
- Location of Rebergues
- Location within France Location within Hauts-de-France
- Coordinates: 50°45′28″N 1°57′32″E
- Country: France
- Region: Hauts-de-France
- Department: Pas-de-Calais
- Arrondissement: Saint-Omer
- Canton: Lumbres
- Intercommunality: Pays de Lumbres

Government
  - Mayor (2020–2026): Pascal Wacquet
- Area^{1}: 4.74 km^{2} (1.83 sq mi)
- Elevation: 90 m (300 ft)
- Highest elevation: 196 m (643 ft)
- Lowest elevation: 60 m (200 ft)
- Population (2023): 403
  - Density: 85.0/km^{2} (220/sq mi)
- Time zone: UTC+01:00 (CET)
  - Summer (DST): UTC+02:00 (CEST)
- INSEE/Postal code: 62692 /62850
- ^{1} French Land Register data, which excludes lakes, ponds, glaciers > 1 km^{2} (0.386 sq mi or 247 acres) and river estuaries.

Rebergues (French pronunciation: [ʁəbɛʁɡ]; West Flemish: Rosberge) is a commune in the Pas-de-Calais department in the Hauts-de-France region of France.

== Geography ==
Rebergues lies about 12 miles (19 km) west of Saint-Omer, on the D216E road.

== Population ==
Historical population
Year	Pop.	±% p.a.
1968	153	—
1975	134	−1.88%
1982	136	+0.21%
1990	147	+0.98%
1999	159	+0.88%
2007	196	+2.65%
2012	292	+8.30%
2017	375	+5.13%
2023	403	+1.21%
Source: INSEE

== Transport ==
The Chemin de fer de Boulogne à Bonningues (CF de BB) opened a station at Le Mouflon, near Rebergues, on 22 April 1900. Passenger services were withdrawn on 31 December 1935. They were reinstated in November 1942. The CF de BB closed in 1948.

== Places of interest ==
- The eighteenth century church.
- The Château du Rougefort, dating from the eighteenth century.

== See also ==
- Communes of the Pas-de-Calais department
