= Sanghen =

- Commune
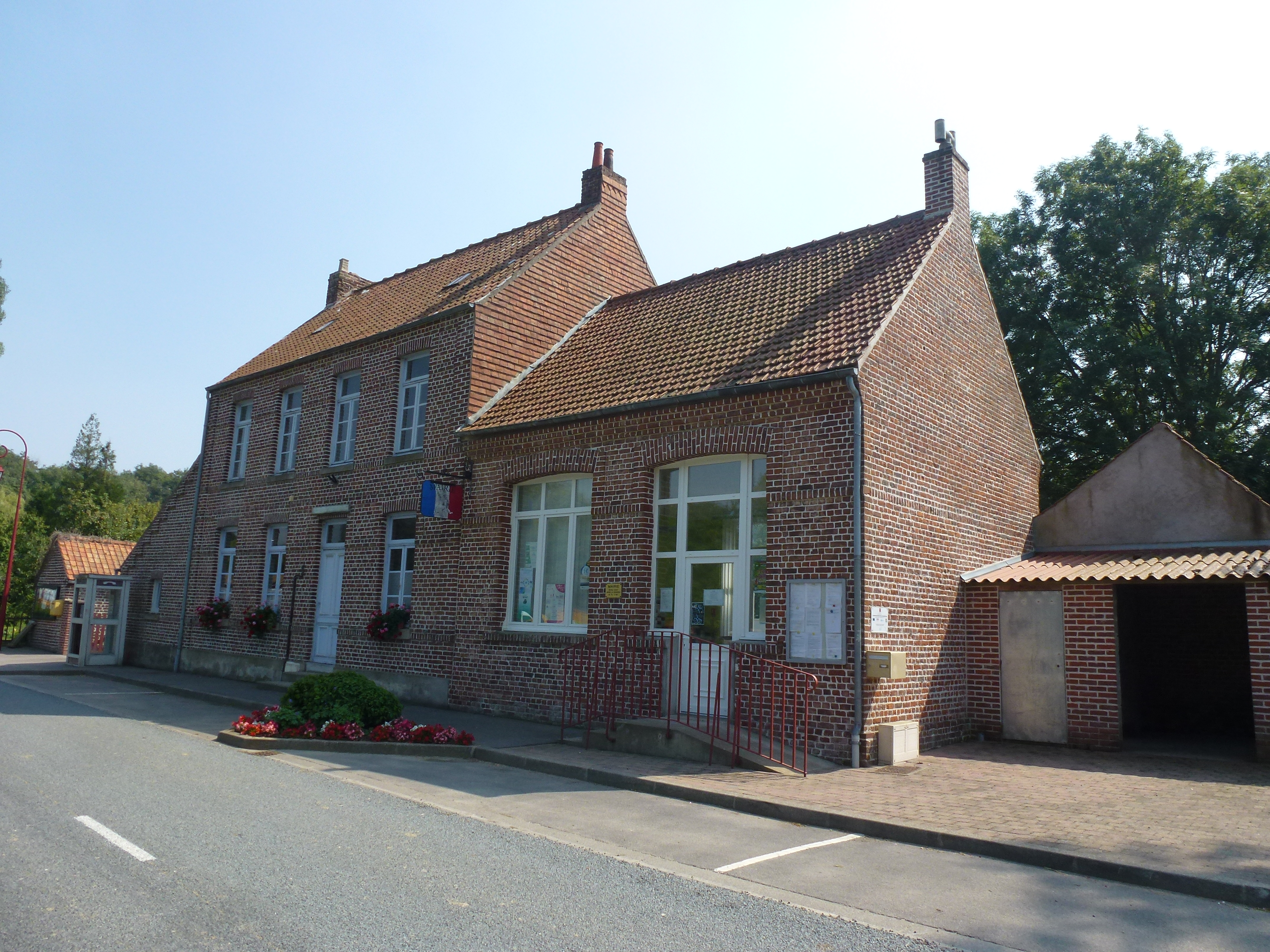
- The town hall of Sanghen

- Coat of arms
- Location of Sanghen
- Location within France Location within Hauts-de-France
- Coordinates: 50°46′37″N 1°54′12″E
- Country: France
- Region: Hauts-de-France
- Department: Pas-de-Calais
- Arrondissement: Calais
- Canton: Calais-2
- Intercommunality: CC Pays d'Opale

Government
  - Mayor (2020–2026): Jean-Pierre Doye
- Area^{1}: 6.17 km^{2} (2.38 sq mi)
- Elevation: 87 m (285 ft)
- Highest elevation: 196 m (643 ft)
- Lowest elevation: 74 m (243 ft)
- Population (2023): 315
  - Density: 51.1/km^{2} (132/sq mi)
- Time zone: UTC+01:00 (CET)
  - Summer (DST): UTC+02:00 (CEST)
- INSEE/Postal code: 62775 /62850
- ^{1} French Land Register data, which excludes lakes, ponds, glaciers > 1 km^{2} (0.386 sq mi or 247 acres) and river estuaries.

Sanghen (French pronunciation: [sɑ̃ɡɑ̃]) is a commune in the Pas-de-Calais department in the Hauts-de-France region of France 13 miles (22 km) south of Calais.

== Population ==
Historical population
Year	Pop.	±% p.a.
1968	206	—
1975	193	−0.93%
1982	201	+0.58%
1990	231	+1.75%
1999	223	−0.39%
2007	263	+2.08%
2012	287	+1.76%
2017	329	+2.77%
2023	315	−0.72%
Source: INSEE

== See also ==
Communes of the Pas-de-Calais department
