= Hocquinghen =

- Commune
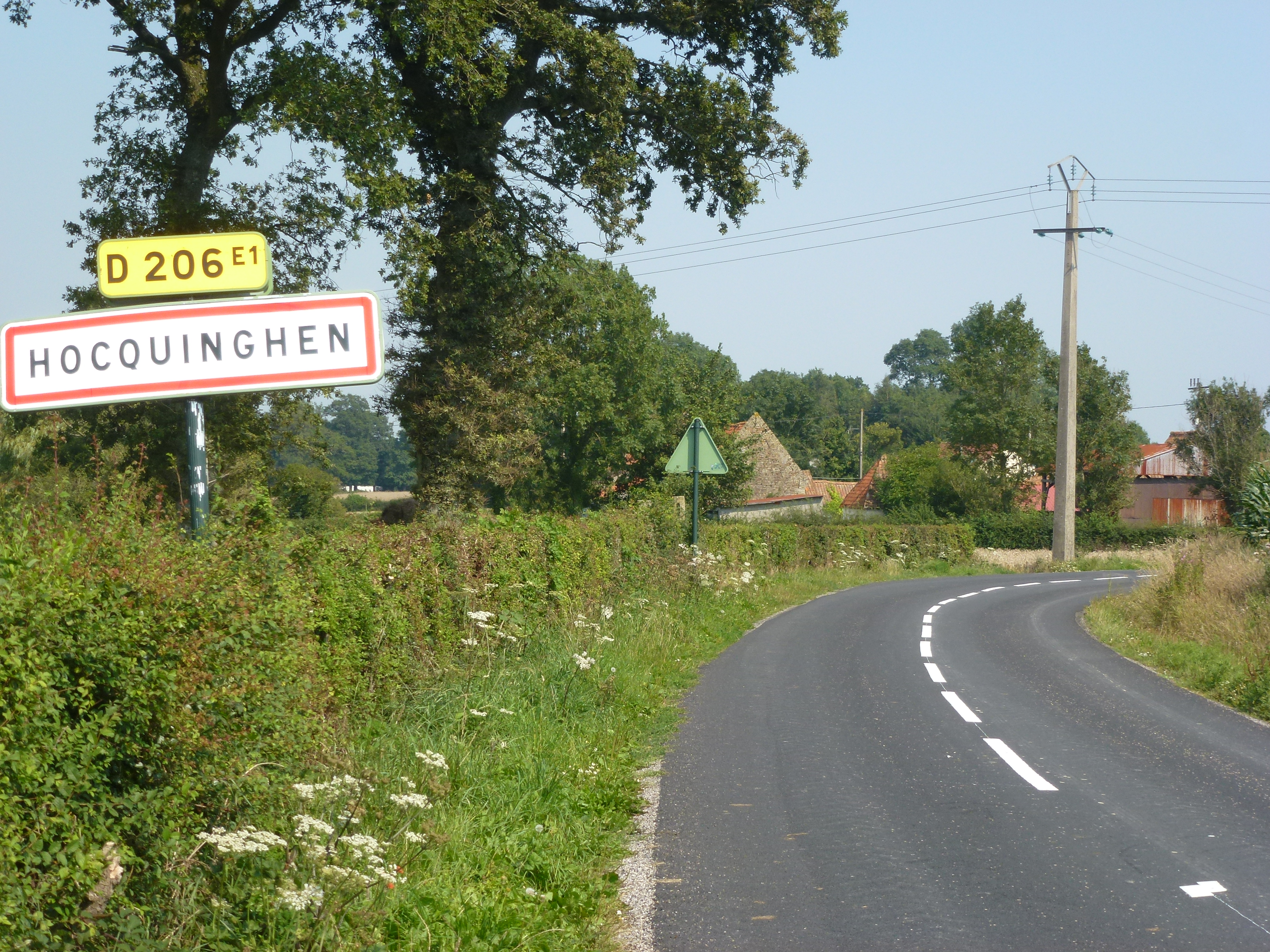
- The road into Hocquinghen

- Coat of arms
- Location of Hocquinghen
- Location within France Location within Hauts-de-France
- Coordinates: 50°46′10″N 1°56′20″E
- Country: France
- Region: Hauts-de-France
- Department: Pas-de-Calais
- Arrondissement: Calais
- Canton: Calais-2
- Intercommunality: CC Pays d'Opale

Government
  - Mayor (2020–2026): Laurent Defachelles
- Area^{1}: 1.94 km^{2} (0.75 sq mi)
- Elevation: 81 m (266 ft)
- Highest elevation: 115 m (377 ft)
- Lowest elevation: 63 m (207 ft)
- Population (2023): 118
  - Density: 60.8/km^{2} (158/sq mi)
- Time zone: UTC+01:00 (CET)
  - Summer (DST): UTC+02:00 (CEST)
- INSEE/Postal code: 62455 /62850
- ^{1} French Land Register data, which excludes lakes, ponds, glaciers > 1 km^{2} (0.386 sq mi or 247 acres) and river estuaries.

Hocquinghen (French pronunciation: [ɔkɛ̃ɡɑ̃]; Dutch: Hokkingem) is a commune in the Pas-de-Calais department in the Hauts-de-France region of France 13 miles (19 km) south of Calais.

== Population ==
Historical population
Year	Pop.	±% p.a.
1968	97	—
1975	86	−1.70%
1982	74	−2.12%
1990	85	+1.75%
1999	100	+1.82%
2007	101	+0.12%
2012	114	+2.45%
2017	112	−0.35%
2023	118	+0.87%
Source: INSEE

== Transport ==
The Chemin de fer de Boulogne à Bonningues (CF de BB) opened a station serving Hocquinghen and Herbinghen on 22 April 1900. Passenger services were withdrawn on 31 December 1935. They were reinstated in November 1942. The CF de BB closed in 1948.

== See also ==
- Communes of the Pas-de-Calais department
