= Alembon =

- Commune
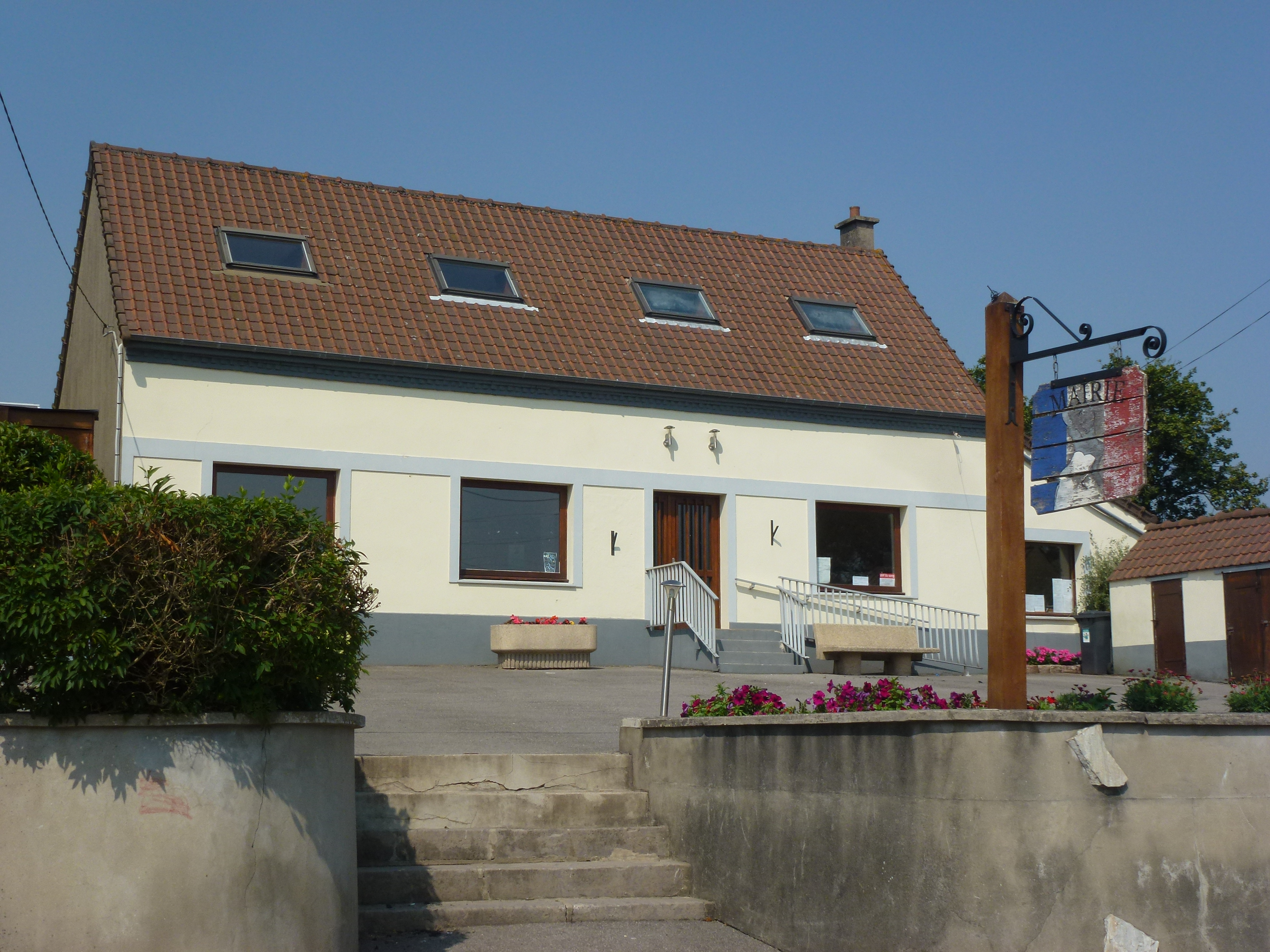
- The town hall of Alembon

- Coat of arms
- Location of Alembon
- Location within France Location within Hauts-de-France
- Coordinates: 50°47′07″N 1°53′16″E
- Country: France
- Region: Hauts-de-France
- Department: Pas-de-Calais
- Arrondissement: Calais
- Canton: Calais-2
- Intercommunality: Pays d'Opale

Government
  - Mayor (2020–2026): Thierry Guilbert
- Area^{1}: 8.97 km^{2} (3.46 sq mi)
- Elevation: 106 m (348 ft)
- Highest elevation: 191 m (627 ft)
- Lowest elevation: 90 m (300 ft)
- Population (2023): 624
  - Density: 69.6/km^{2} (180/sq mi)
- Time zone: UTC+01:00 (CET)
  - Summer (DST): UTC+02:00 (CEST)
- INSEE/Postal code: 62020 /62850
- ^{1} French Land Register data, which excludes lakes, ponds, glaciers > 1 km^{2} (0.386 sq mi or 247 acres) and river estuaries.

Alembon (French pronunciation: [alɑ̃bɔ̃]) is a commune in the Pas-de-Calais department in northern France.

== Geography ==
A farming village located 11 miles (17 km) south of Calais, on the D191 road.

== Population ==
Historical population
Year	Pop.	±% p.a.
1968	413	—
1975	413	+0.00%
1982	395	−0.63%
1990	358	−1.22%
1999	395	+1.10%
2007	516	+3.40%
2012	624	+3.87%
2017	630	+0.19%
2023	624	−0.16%
Source: INSEE

== Sights ==
- The church, dating from the fifteenth century.

== See also ==
- Communes of the Pas-de-Calais department
