= Hermelinghen =

- Commune
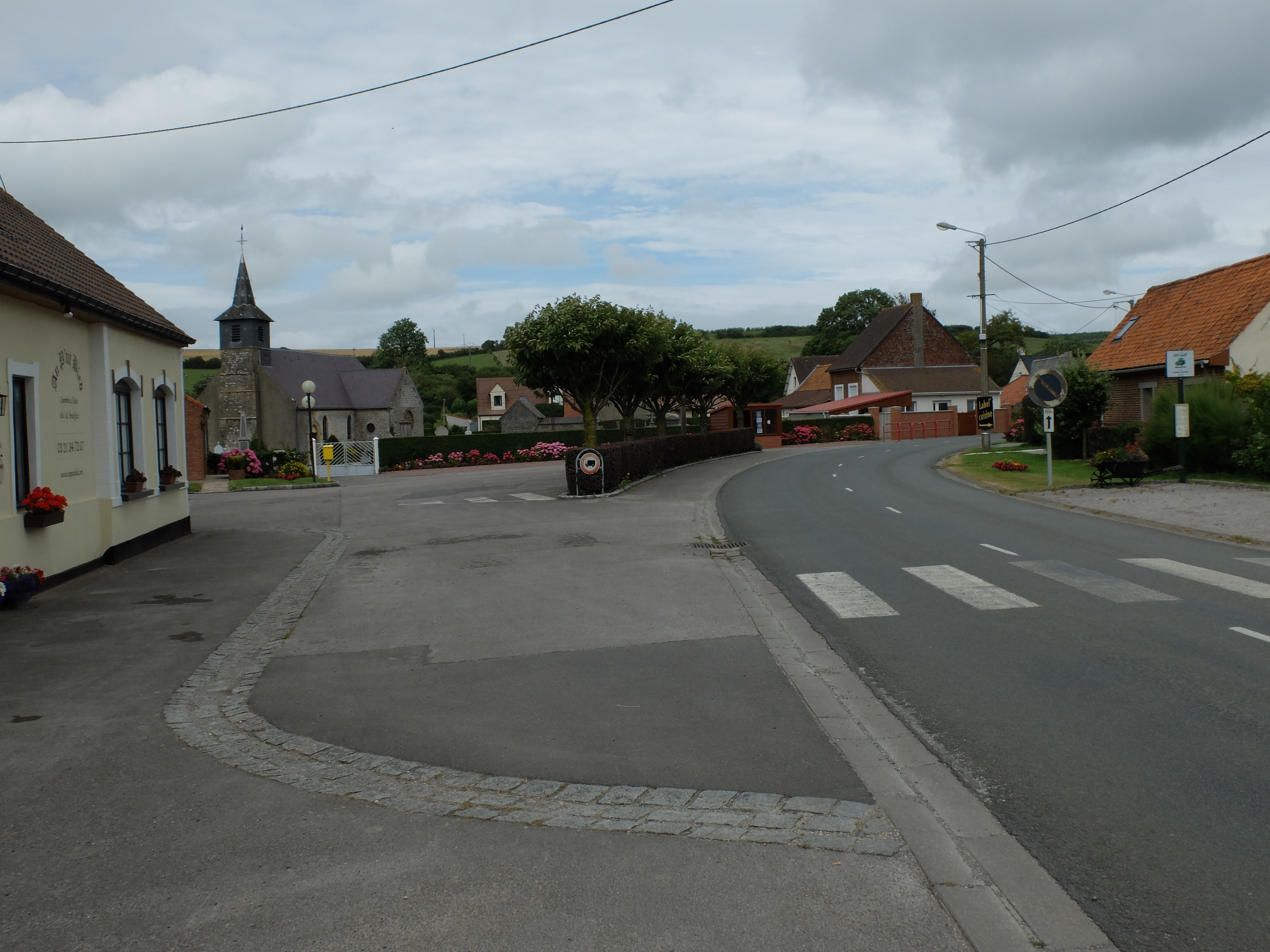
- The centre of Hermelinghen

- Coat of arms
- Location of Hermelinghen
- Location within France Location within Hauts-de-France
- Coordinates: 50°48′10″N 1°51′40″E
- Country: France
- Region: Hauts-de-France
- Department: Pas-de-Calais
- Arrondissement: Calais
- Canton: Calais-2
- Intercommunality: CC Pays d'Opale

Government
  - Mayor (2020–2026): Christophe Dupont
- Area^{1}: 6.43 km^{2} (2.48 sq mi)
- Elevation: 118 m (387 ft)
- Highest elevation: 185 m (607 ft)
- Lowest elevation: 95 m (312 ft)
- Population (2023): 407
  - Density: 63.3/km^{2} (164/sq mi)
- Time zone: UTC+01:00 (CET)
  - Summer (DST): UTC+02:00 (CEST)
- INSEE/Postal code: 62439 /62132
- ^{1} French Land Register data, which excludes lakes, ponds, glaciers > 1 km^{2} (0.386 sq mi or 247 acres) and river estuaries.

Hermelinghen (French pronunciation: [ɛʁməlɛ̃ɡɑ̃]) is a commune in the Pas-de-Calais department in the Hauts-de-France region of France 13 miles (19 km) south of Calais. The source of the river Slack is in Hermelinghen.

== Population ==
Historical population
Year	Pop.	±% p.a.
1968	211	—
1975	217	+0.40%
1982	263	+2.78%
1990	288	+1.14%
1999	289	+0.04%
2007	299	+0.43%
2012	359	+3.73%
2017	422	+3.29%
2023	407	−0.60%
Source: INSEE

== See also ==
- Communes of the Pas-de-Calais department
