= Ardres =

Ardres Aarden
- Commune
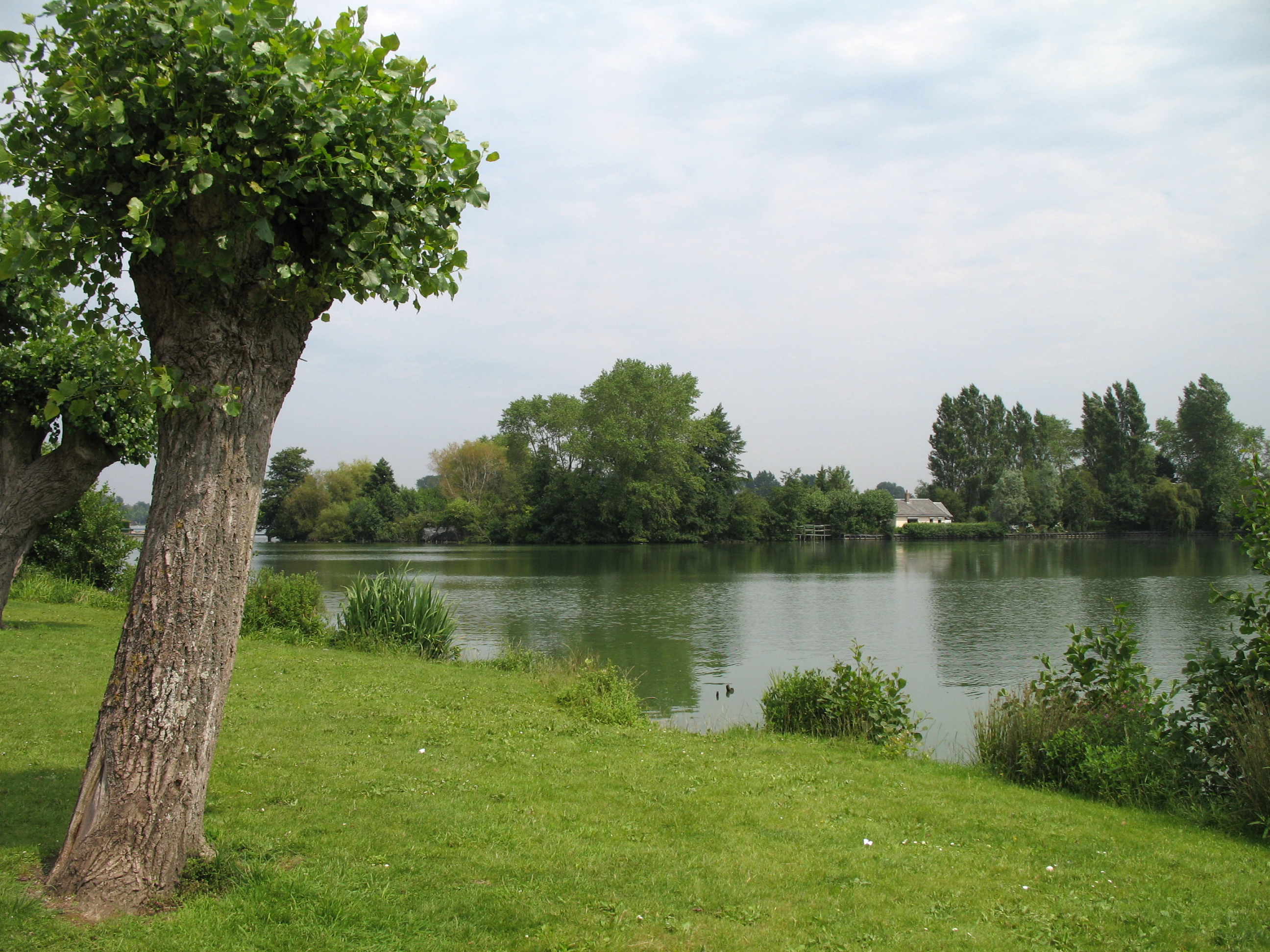
- Lakes north of Ardres

- Coat of arms
- Location of Ardres
- Location within France Location within Hauts-de-France
- Coordinates: 50°51′20″N 1°58′42″E
- Country: France
- Region: Hauts-de-France
- Department: Pas-de-Calais
- Arrondissement: Calais
- Canton: Calais-2
- Intercommunality: CC Pays d'Opale

Government
  - Mayor (2020–2026): Ludovic Loquet
- Area^{1}: 13.52 km^{2} (5.22 sq mi)
- Elevation: 11 m (36 ft)
- Highest elevation: 17 m (56 ft)
- Lowest elevation: 2 m (6.6 ft)
- Population (2023): 4,389
  - Density: 324.6/km^{2} (840.8/sq mi)
- Time zone: UTC+01:00 (CET)
  - Summer (DST): UTC+02:00 (CEST)
- INSEE/Postal code: 62038 /62610
- ^{1} French Land Register data, which excludes lakes, ponds, glaciers > 1 km^{2} (0.386 sq mi or 247 acres) and river estuaries.

Ardres (French pronunciation: [aʁdʁ]; West Flemish: Aarden; Picard: Arde) is a commune in the Pas-de-Calais department in northern France.

== Geography ==
Ardres is located 10.1 mi by rail (station is at Pont-d'Ardres, a few kilometers from Ardres) S.S.E. of Calais, with which it is also connected by a canal (with limited turning space). It is one of three towns that make up Les Trois Pays, or "Three Countries", the other two being Guînes and Licques.

== History ==
Ardes was located next to the Pale of Calais, held by the English from 1346 to 1558, and as a result was an important trading and military post. The 1520 meeting between Henry VIII of England and Francis I of France known as the Field of the Cloth of Gold was held just over the border at the English-controlled town of Balinghem. The town has been an important market for cattle. In June 1546, it was the location of the Treaty of Ardres, an agreement between Henry and Francis that ended the 1542-1546 Anglo-French War.

== Population ==
The inhabitants are called Ardrésiens in French.

Historical population

Year	Pop.	±% p.a.
1793	1,596	—
1800	1,466	−1.21%
1806	1,645	+1.94%
1821	1,844	+0.76%
1831	2,016	+0.90%
1836	2,150	+1.30%
1841	2,195	+0.42%
1846	2,112	−0.77%
1851	2,071	−0.39%
1856	2,031	−0.39%
1861	2,277	+2.31%
1866	2,189	−0.79%
1872	2,143	−0.35%
1876	2,223	+0.92%
1881	2,293	+0.62%
1886	2,274	−0.17%
1891	2,473	+1.69%
1896	2,522	+0.39%
1901	2,597	+0.59%

Year	Pop.	±% p.a.
1906	2,717	+0.91%
1911	2,785	+0.50%
1921	2,839	+0.19%
1926	2,708	−0.94%
1931	2,625	−0.62%
1936	2,719	+0.71%
1946	2,901	+0.65%
1954	2,939	+0.16%
1962	2,997	+0.24%
1968	3,195	+1.07%
1975	3,126	−0.31%
1982	3,390	+1.16%
1990	3,936	+1.88%
1999	4,154	+0.60%
2007	4,193	+0.12%
2012	4,268	+0.36%
2017	4,405	+0.63%
2023	4,389	−0.06%

Source: EHESS and INSEE (1968-2023)

== Sights ==
Major tourist attractions at Ardres include the Chapelle des Carmes and the Eglise Notre Dame de Grâce.

There are also some lakes (created when peat was removed) which provide fishing and sailing.

== Personalities ==
- Jean-Marie Dorsenne (1773–1812), a French military commander of the Revolutionary and Napoleonic Wars, was born in Ardres

== Transport ==
The Chemin de fer d'Anvin à Calais opened a railway station at Ardres in 1881. In 1902, the Tramway à vapeur d'Ardres à Pont d'Ardres opened a line from Ardres station to Pont d'Ardres. The railways were closed in 1955.

== See also ==
- Communes of the Pas-de-Calais department

== Sources ==
- Courteault, Paul (1908). Blaise de Montluc; Historien (in French). Bibliothèque Méridionale.
- Farebrother, Martin J B; Farebrother, Joan S (2008). Tortillards of Artois. Usk: The Oakwood Press. ISBN 978-0-85361-679-5.
