= Guînes =

Guînes Giezene
- Commune
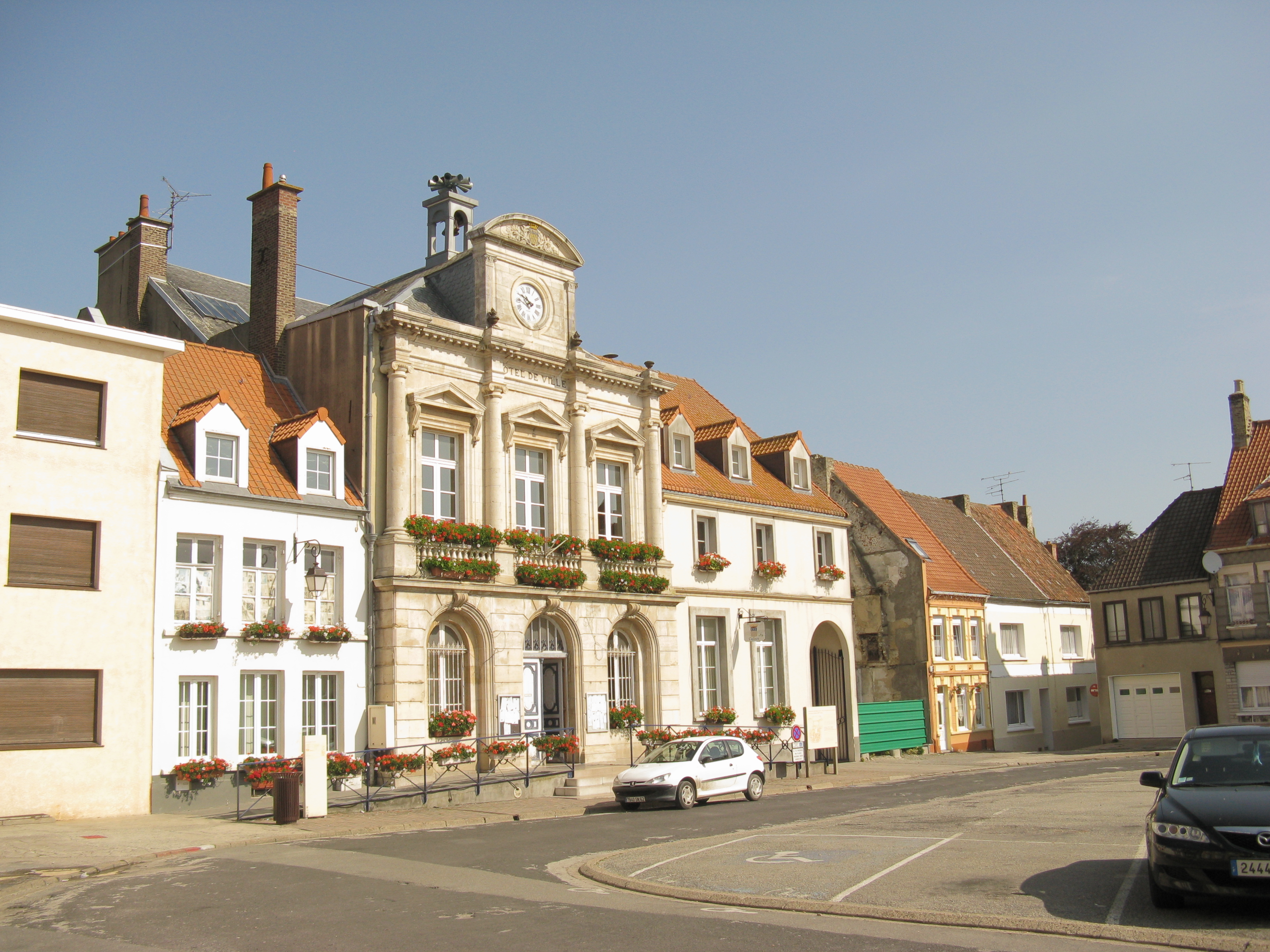
- Town hall and plaza

- Coat of arms
- Location of Guînes
- Location within France Location within Hauts-de-France
- Coordinates: 50°52′09″N 01°52′13″E
- Country: France
- Region: Hauts-de-France
- Department: Pas-de-Calais
- Arrondissement: Calais
- Canton: Calais-2
- Intercommunality: CC des Pays d'Opale

Government
  - Mayor (2020–2026): Éric Buy
- Area^{1}: 26.42 km^{2} (10.20 sq mi)
- Elevation: 6 m (20 ft)
- Highest elevation: 166 m (545 ft)
- Lowest elevation: 0 m (0 ft)
- Population (2023): 5,479
  - Density: 207.4/km^{2} (537.1/sq mi)
- Demonym: Guînois
- Time zone: UTC+01:00 (CET)
  - Summer (DST): UTC+02:00 (CEST)
- INSEE/Postal code: 62397 /62340
- ^{1} French Land Register data, which excludes lakes, ponds, glaciers > 1 km^{2} (0.386 sq mi or 247 acres) and river estuaries.

Guînes (French pronunciation: [ɡin]; West Flemish: Giezene; Picard: Guinne) is a commune in the northern French department of Pas-de-Calais. Historically, it was spelt Guisnes.

On 7 January 1785, Jean-Pierre Blanchard, a French pioneer in hydrogen-balloon flight, completed the first aerial crossing of the English Channel, landing in the woods south of Guînes, where a memorial column stands today.

== Geography ==
Guînes is located on the border of the two territories of the Boulonnais and Calaisis, at the edge of the now-drained marshes, which extend from there to the coast. The Guînes canal connects with Calais.

== History ==
Historically, Guînes was the capital of a small county of the same name.

After the Romans left, in the 5th century, there is little known about the town. In the Dark Ages, according to legend, the territory of Guînes became the property of one Aigneric, Mayor of the Palace of the Burgundian king Théodebert II.

In 928, when the Danes invaded and seized the place, it was probably a defenceless village. A fenced mound and a double ditch would soon have been created by the Danes. This is the origin of the castle of Guînes. Arnulf I, Count of Flanders, realizing a counter-attack would be costly, arranged the marriage of his daughter Elstrude, to Sigfrid, the Danish leader, bestowing upon him the title of Count of Guînes but as vassal to him, the Count of Flanders. Under Sigfrid's successors, the county of Guînes acquired considerable importance.

At the beginning of the 11th century, Count Manassès founded a convent of the order of St Benedict. This was placed under the jurisdiction of the nearby abbey of Saint Léonard. At that time, Guînes comprised three parishes within its walls, whose churches were dedicated to Saint Bertin, Saint Pierre and Saint Médard. Outside the town ramparts were the abbey of Saint Léonard, the church of Saint-Blaise, in the hamlet of Melleke, and the leper-house of Saint Quentin, in the hamlet of Spelleke in Tournepuits.

At the end of the 11th century, Baldwin I, Count of Guînes, built a huge stone castle on top of Sigfrid's old keep and enclosed the town within a stone wall, with defensive towers at each of the entrances. His brother Fulk was a participant in the First Crusade. In 1180, Guînes was passed together with Ardres, Arras and Saint-Omer to the French crown as part of the dowry of Isabel of Hainaut when she married Philip II of France.

On 22 January 1351, three years after the capture of Calais by Edward III, the castle of Guînes was delivered up to the English. In 1360, the Treaty of Brétigny surrendered the city and its county to England and they eventually became part of the Pale of Calais, the last English possession in mainland France. The "Field of the Cloth of Gold", where Henry VIII of England and Francis I of France met in 1520, was at Balinghem in the immediate neighbourhood.

When the French captured the port of Calais in January 1558, Guînes held out, by the courageous efforts of the English commander, William Grey, 13th Baron Grey de Wilton. After a few days of desperate fighting, however, Grey was wounded and his soldiers refused to fight on. The French gave honourable terms of surrender and English rule of the area came to an end.

== Population ==
The inhabitants are called Guinois in French.

Historical population
Year	Pop.	±% p.a.
1968	4,984	—
1975	5,034	+0.14%
1982	5,174	+0.39%
1990	5,105	−0.17%
1999	5,221	+0.25%
2007	5,302	+0.19%
2012	5,754	+1.65%
2017	5,626	−0.45%
2023	5,479	−0.44%
Source: INSEE

== Places and monuments ==
=== Blanchard's Column ===
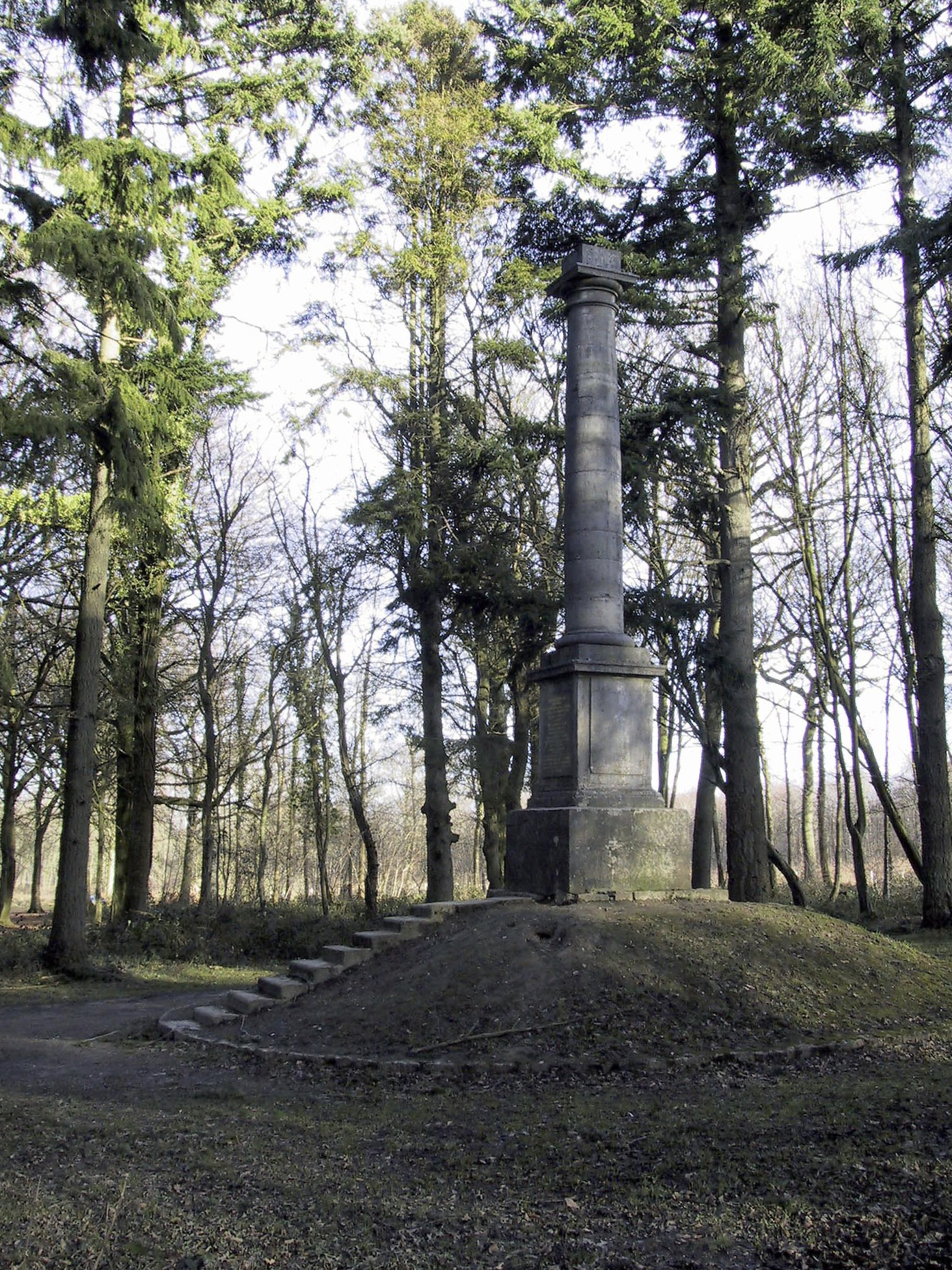
Blanchard's column

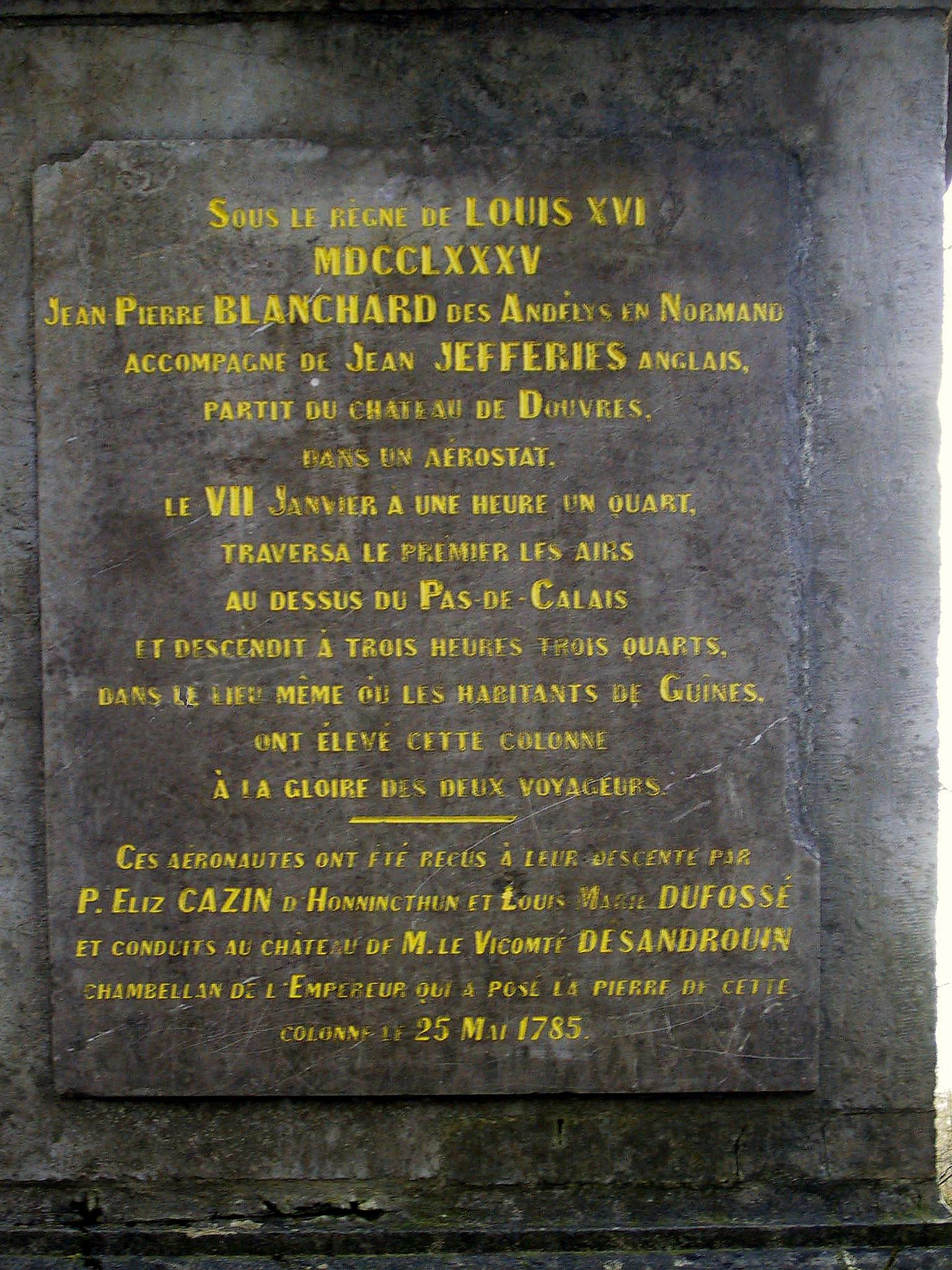
The plaque on the column

On 25 May 1785 a column was erected to commemorate Jean-Pierre Blanchard's crossing of the English Channel by hydrogen balloon on 7 January 1785. (50°50′31″N 1°52′02″E). The inscription reads as follows, here translated into English:

Under the reign of Louis XVI
MDCCLXXXV
Jean-Pierre Blanchard of Les Andelys in Normandy
accompanied by John Jeffries an Englishman
Leaving from Dover Castle
in an Aerostat.
January 7th at a quarter past one,
was the first to cross the air
above the Pas-de-Calais
and descended at a quarter to four
in the very place where the inhabitants of Guines
raised this column
to the glory of the two travellers.

These aeronauts were received on their descent by
P. Eliz Casin d'Honnincthun and Louis Marie Dufosse.
and taken to the castle of M.Le Vicomte Desandrouin
Chamberlain of the Emperor who laid the stone of this
column on May 25, 1785. (Note: Original text of Blanchard's Column at Guînes: Sous le régné de Louis XVI MDCCLXXXV, Jean-Pierre Blanchard des Andelys en Normand, Accompagne de Jean Jefferies Anglais, Partit du chateau de Douvre dans un Aérostat, Le VII Janvier a une heure un quart, traversa le prémier les airs au dessus de Pas-de-Calais, et descendit de trois heures trois quarts dans le lieux même ou les habitants de Guînes. Ont élevé cette colonne À la gloire des deux voyageurs. Ces aeronauts en été recus à leur descent par P. Eliz Casin d'Honnincthun et Louis Marie Dufossé, Et conduits au château de M.Le Vicomté Desandrouin, Chambellan de L'Empereur qui a posé la pierre de cette colonne le 25 Mai 1785.)

== Transport ==
The Chemin de fer d'Anvin à Calais opened a railway station at Guînes in 1881. The railway was closed in 1955.

== Notable people ==
- Lambert of Guînes

== See also ==
- Communes of the Pas-de-Calais department

== Sources ==
- Ardres, Lambert of (24 November 2010). The History of the Counts of Guines and Lords of Ardres. University of Pennsylvania Press. ISBN 978-0-8122-0054-6.
- Farebrother, Martin J B; Farebrother, Joan S (2008). Tortillards of Artois. Usk: The Oakwood Press. ISBN 978-0-85361-679-5.
