= Arrondissements of the Pas-de-Calais department =

French administrative divisions

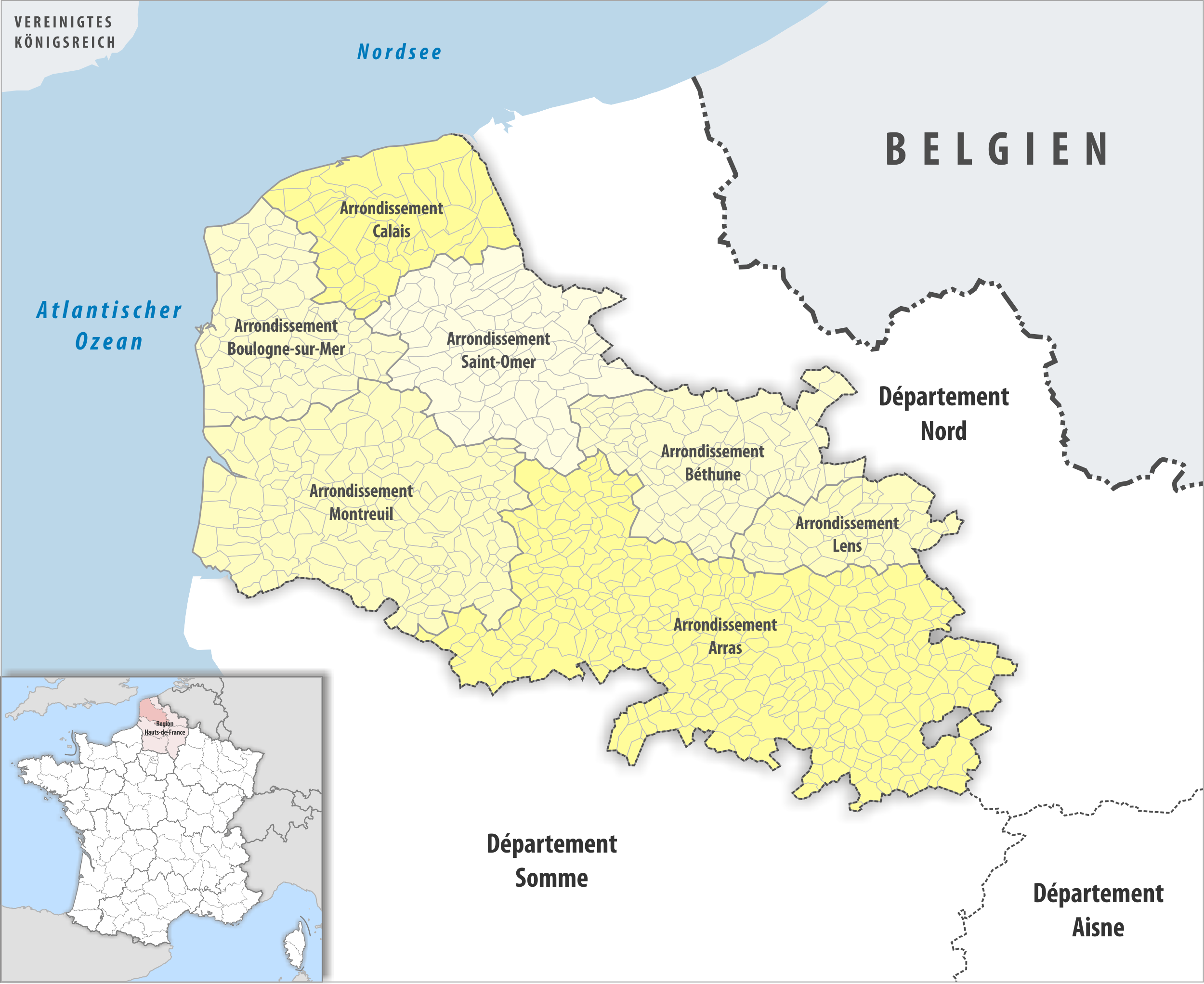
Map of arrondissements of the Pas-de-Calais department.

The 7 arrondissements of the Pas-de-Calais department are:

1. Arrondissement of Arras, (prefecture of the Pas-de-Calais department: Arras) with 357 communes. The population of the arrondissement was 249,961 in 2021.
2. Arrondissement of Béthune, (subprefecture: Béthune) with 104 communes. The population of the arrondissement was 292,114 in 2021.
3. Arrondissement of Boulogne-sur-Mer, (subprefecture: Boulogne-sur-Mer) with 74 communes. The population of the arrondissement was 157,817 in 2021.
4. Arrondissement of Calais, (subprefecture: Calais) with 52 communes. The population of the arrondissement was 152,091 in 2021.
5. Arrondissement of Lens, (subprefecture: Lens) with 50 communes. The population of the arrondissement was 369,427 in 2021.
6. Arrondissement of Montreuil, (subprefecture: Montreuil) with 164 communes. The population of the arrondissement was 110,907 in 2021.
7. Arrondissement of Saint-Omer, (subprefecture: Saint-Omer) with 89 communes. The population of the arrondissement was 129,124 in 2021.

== History ==
In 1800 the arrondissements of Arras, Béthune, Boulogne, Montreuil and Saint-Omer were established. The arrondissement of Saint-Pol was created in 1801, and disbanded in 1926. In 1962 the arrondissement of Calais was created from part of the arrondissement of Boulogne-sur-Mer, and the arrondissement of Lens from part of the arrondissement of Béthune. In January 2007 the arrondissement of Arras lost the canton of Le Parcq to the arrondissement of Montreuil, and the two cantons of Avion and Rouvroy to the arrondissement of Lens.

The borders of the arrondissements of Pas-de-Calais were modified in January 2017:

- three communes from the arrondissement of Arras to the arrondissement of Béthune
- eight communes from the arrondissement of Arras to the arrondissement of Lens
- one commune from the arrondissement of Boulogne-sur-Mer to the arrondissement of Calais
- one commune from the arrondissement of Lens to the arrondissement of Béthune
- 23 communes from the arrondissement of Saint-Omer to the arrondissement of Calais

== See also ==
- Communes of the Pas-de-Calais department
- Cantons of the Pas-de-Calais department
