= Canton of Saint-Omer-Nord =

Coordinates: 50°46′27″N 2°12′47″E

Saint-Omer-Nord
- Former canton
- Interactive map of Saint-Omer-Nord
- Country: France
- Region: Hauts-de-France
- Department: Pas-de-Calais
- No. of communes: {{{nbcomm}}}
- Disbanded: 2015
- Population (2012): 15,714

The canton of Saint-Omer-Nord is a former canton situated in the department of the Pas-de-Calais and in the Nord-Pas-de-Calais region of northern France. It was disbanded following the French canton reorganisation which came into effect in March 2015. It consisted of 9 communes, which joined the canton of Saint-Omer in 2015. It had a total of 15,714 inhabitants (2012).

== Geography ==
The canton is organised around Saint-Omer in the arrondissement of Saint-Omer. The altitude varies from 0 m (Houlle) to 166 m (Moringhem) for an average altitude of 23m.

The canton comprised 9 communes:

- Clairmarais
- Houlle
- Moringhem
- Moulle
- Saint-Martin-au-Laërt
- Saint-Omer (partly)
- Salperwick
- Serques
- Tilques

== See also ==
- Cantons of Pas-de-Calais
- Communes of Pas-de-Calais
- Arrondissements of the Pas-de-Calais department
