= List of windmills in Pas-de-Calais =

A list of windmills in Pas-de-Calais, France.

Location	Name of mill	Type	Built	Notes	Photograph
Achicourt	Moulin de la Terelle; Moulin Hacart	Moulin Tour	Late 18th century	Moulins a Vent (in French)	
Andres		Moulin Tour			
Ardres	Moulin Desombre	Moulin Tour	Late 17th century	Moulins a Vent (in French)	
Beuvry-les-Bethune	Moulin du Ballon; Moulin de Beuvry	Moulin Tour	1811	Moulins a Vent (in French)	
Bouquehault	Moulin de Bouquehault	Moulin Tour			
Carvin		Moulin tour		House conversion Moulins a Vent (in French)	
Clairmarais	Moulin de Schoubrouck; Moulin de Zuyd Brouck	Moulin Tour		Moulins a Vent (in French)	
Clairmarais	Moulin près la Grotte du Bois	Moulin Tour		Moulins a Vent (in French)	
Coquelles	Moulin Michel; Moulin de l'Ingratitude	Moulin Pivot	1834	Moulins a Vent (in French)	
Courcelles-lès-Lens	Moulin de Courcelles lès Lens	Moulin Tour			
Courcelles-lès-Lens		Moulin Tour en Bois			
Escalles	Moulin d'Escalles	Moulin Tour		Moulins a Vent (in French)	
Étaples		Moulin Tour			
Étaples	Moulin Cousin	Moulin Tour			
Fontaine-l'Étalon	Moulin de Fontaine				
Guemps	Moulin du Pont-de-Guemps; Moulin Bollart	Moulin Tour	1842	Moulins a Vent (in French)	
Guînes	Moulin des Trois Frères	Moulin Tour		Moulins a Vent (in French)	
Héricourt	Moulin d'Héricourt				
Inglinghem		Moulin Tour			
Libercourt	Moulin de Libercourt				
Ligny-lès-Aire	Moulin de Ligny les Aire	Moulin Tour	1819	Moulins a Vent (in French)	
Lillers	Moulin Rouge				
Louches	Moulin Dupont	Moulin Tour	1847	Moulins a Vent (in French)	
Maintenay	Moulin de Mon Plaisir; Moulin de Maintenay			Moulins a Vent (in French)	
Marquise	Moulin a Marquise	Moulin Tour		Moulins a Vent (in French)	
Mentque-Nortbécourt	Moulin Lebriez; Moulin Liot; Moulin Blérand	Moulin Tour	1714	Moulins a Vent (in French)	
Mentque-Nortbécourt	Moulin Guillerman	Moulin Tour		Moulins a Vent (in French)	
Monchy-le-Preux		Moulin Pivot		Destroyed during World War I	
Moringhem	Moulin Rivé	Moulin Tour		Moulins a Vent (in French)	
Nort-Leulinghem	Moulin du Brunvert	Moulin Tour		Moulins a Vent (in French)	
Offekerque	Moulin Blanc; Moulin Lianne	Moulin Tour	1809	Moulins a Vent (in French)	
Oye-Plage	Moulin Flament	Moulin Tour		Moulins a Vent (in French)	
Pihen-les-Guines	Moulin de Pihen les Guines; Moulin Lay de Pihen	Moulin Tour	1839	Moulins a Vent (in French)	
Serques	Moulin Davion	Moulin Tour	1775	Moulins a Vent (in French); Panoramio	
Souastre	Moulin de Souastre				
Sainte-Catherine-lez-Arras		Moulin Tour			
Saint-Martin-au-Laërt	Grand Moulin	Moulin Tour		Moulins a Vent (in French)	
Saint-Martin-Boulogne	Moulin l'Abbé	Moulin Tour			
Saint-Omer	Moulin Loos	Moulin Tour	Late 18th or early 19th century	Moulins a Vent (in French)	
Serques		Moulin Tour			
Tournehem-sur-la-Hem	Moulin Bacquet; Moulin de la Ninette	Moulin Tour	1844	Moulins a Vent (in French)	
Valhuon	Moulin de Valhuon	Moulin Tour		Moulins a Vent (in French)	
