= Audomarois =

Administrative division of France

Audomarois (French pronunciation: [odɔmaʁwa]) is an "administrative division" in the Pas-de-Calais department of France, once mainly used as a market garden. As its name suggests, it is centered around the town of Saint-Omer and the Marais Audomarois.

Etymologically, "Audomarois" also refers to the inhabitants of the town of Saint-Omer and those of the Marais Audomarois. In 638, King Dagobert decided to Christianize the north of his kingdom and entrusted this mission to 4 monks: Omer, Bertin, Momelin and Ebertram. Audomar (an early form of Omer) became Bishop of Thérouanne.

== Location ==
The Audomarois, which straddles the Nord and Pas-de-Calais départements, is part of the Saint-Omer arrondissement. It is also largely within the boundaries of the Caps et Marais d'Opale Regional Nature Park.

On the Flanders side, it borders Blootland (Dunkirk) to the north, Houtland to the east, Pale of Calais to the north-west, and the Lys plain to the south-east. On the Artois side, it borders the Licques plateau and Boulonnais to the west, and the Fruges plateau to the south-west.

== Physical data ==
=== Geology and geomorphology ===
The Audomarois is located in the lower region of the Flemish maritime pre-plain. Pale of Calais and Blootland to the north, the Lys plain to the south, Inner Flanders or Houtland to the east, and the Licques plateau to the west delimit the Audomarois natural region.

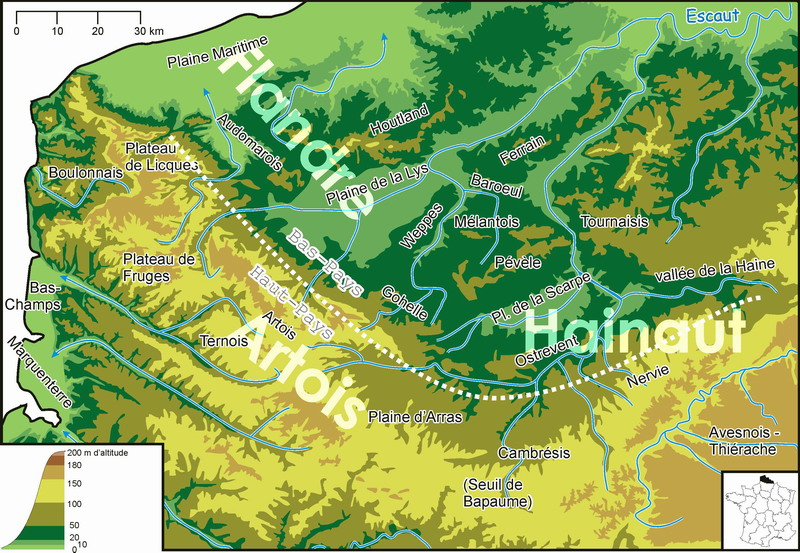
Location of the Audomarois among the natural regions of Nord-Pas-de-Calais.

The Aa valley marks the landscape, as does the Neufossé Canal, which has linked the Lys to the Aa since 1753 and serves as a dividing line with Flanders. The Audomarois marsh was originally a depression in Clairmarais, near Saint-Omer, and is thought to have been a buttonhole excavated in the Ypresian clay by block tectonics.

The Marais Audomarois is surrounded to the west by the hills of the Haut-Pays de l'Artois, and to the east by the chain of Flanders mountains and inland "wooded" Flanders (Houtland). The hillsides are occupied by limestone grasslands near Helfaut.

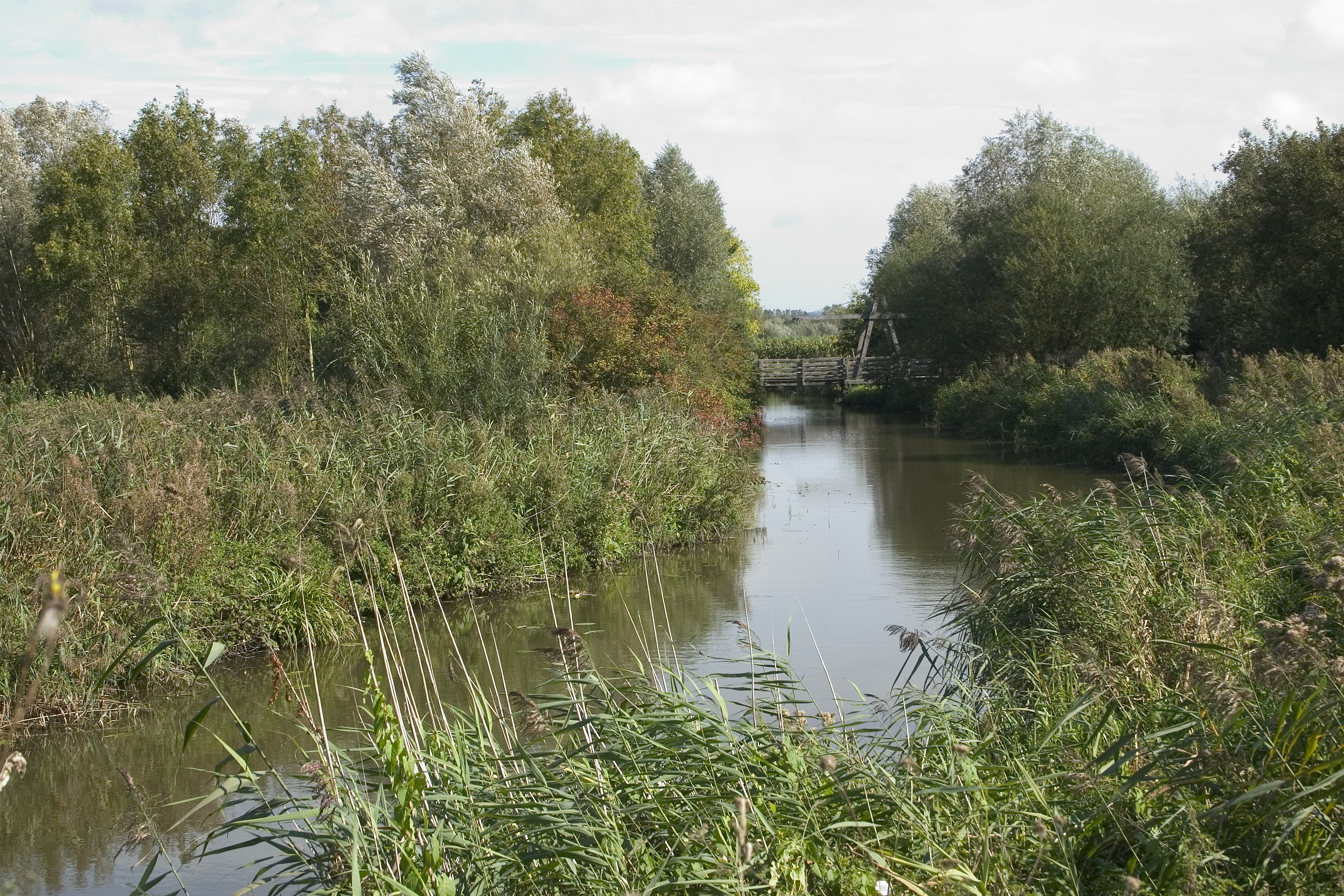
The national nature reserve of the Romelaëre ponds.

=== Hydrographic network and water resources ===
Covering an area of 660 km2, the Audomarois includes 90 km of "main rivers". Their final outlet is the North Sea, via the wateringues network and the remarkable semi-natural environment of the Etangs du Romelaëre, home to the Etangs du Romelaëre National Nature Reserve. The Audomarois region is mainly irrigated and drained by the Aa, a coastal river that flows into the North Sea at Gravelines.

In the Middle Ages, the port of Gravelines was the outport of Saint-Omer (itself a port town during the Carolingian sea-raising period).

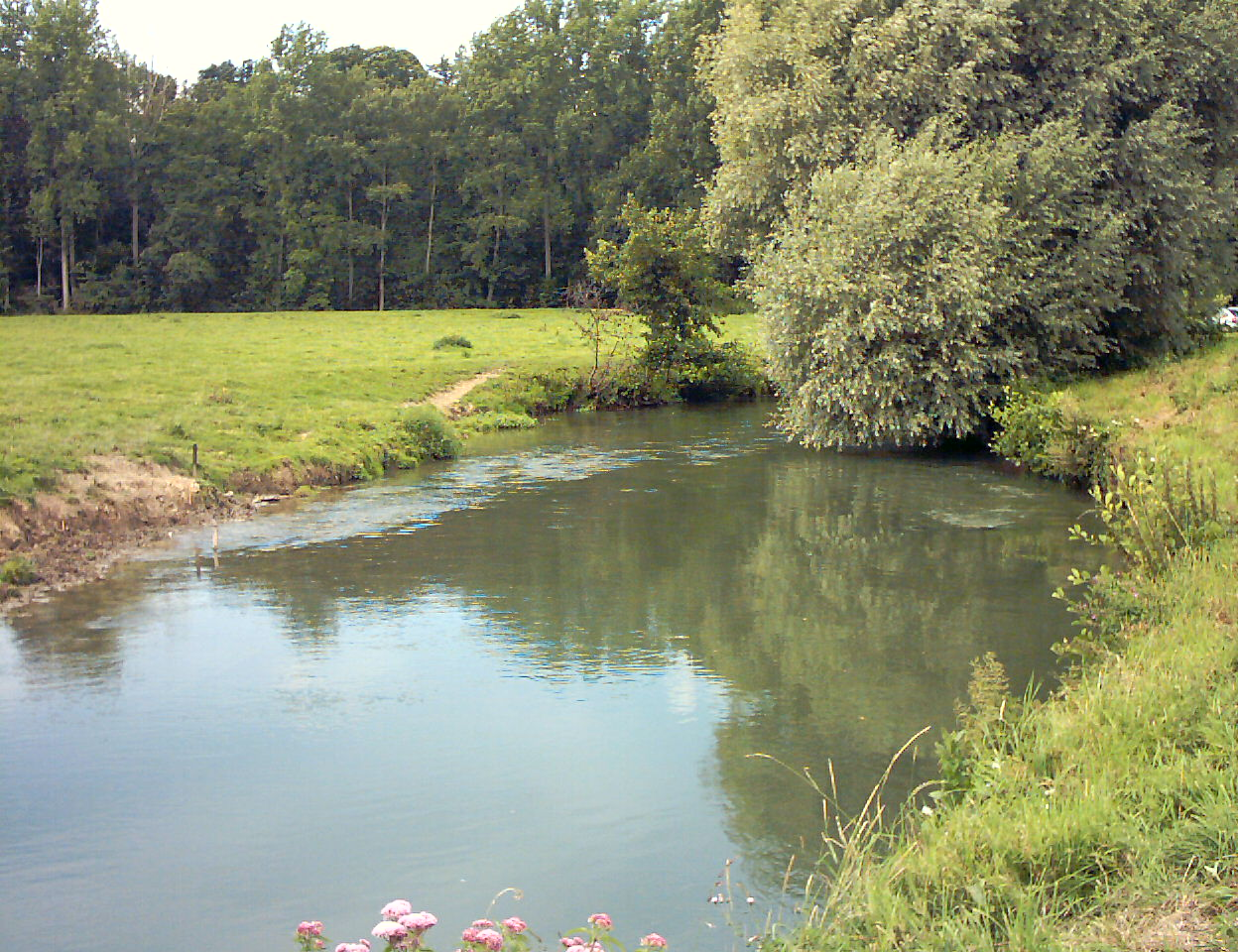
One of the arms of the Aa at Arques (Basse-Meldyck).

The Audomarois is home to water resources that are used far beyond the Audomarois itself. It benefits from surface water (continental water mass) and two aquifers, one of which is exploitable and exploited: the Chalk groundwater mass (code 1001), the other being the Tertiary sand groundwater mass (code 1014).

Water quality and quantity assessment (2008 status) :

- Aa canalisée: In 2008, assessments of the Aa canalisée (from the confluence with the Neufossé Canal to the confluence with the Haute Colme canal) concluded that it had poor ecological potential, due in particular to poor biological status, poor physico-chemical status and a "highly modified and artificial body of water". A significant presence of PAHs has led to this section being provisionally classified as having poor chemical status. To such an extent that the Basin Committee has proposed postponing the "good ecological status" objective to 2021 (instead of 2015).
- Aa-rivière and associated body of water (from the Chalk nappe; code AR02): in 2008, its ecological status was judged to be good, as were its biological and physico-chemical status. However, the hydromorphological context needs to be improved (renaturation of banks and riverbeds over at least 56 km) to "consolidate good ecological status". Its chemical status is considered poor due to the excessive presence of PAHs, probably of industrial origin. Measures to improve domestic sanitation are also proposed.
- The Romelaëre is considered to have good ecological potential and good biological and physico-chemical status.
- Groundwater (code 1001 Craie de l'Audomarois) is not considered to be overexploited, but its qualitative status is classified as "not good" in the 2008 status report. Measures to combat diffuse pollution, notably phosphorus, nitrates and pesticides, have been proposed (alternative cultivation techniques, including the use of synthetic herbicides, acquisition for exchange or renaturation in highly vulnerable areas, erosion control including the restoration of humus and grass cover in areas where groundwater is threatened, restoration of a network of hedgesand embankments perpendicular to slopes, protection and restoration of wetlands, etc.). ), but given the time required for groundwater renewal and the scale of the measures to be taken, the Basin Committee has requested a derogation from Europe, proposing to postpone the achievement of "good qualitative status" to 2027 instead of 2015.

== Human data and traditional economy ==
=== History ===
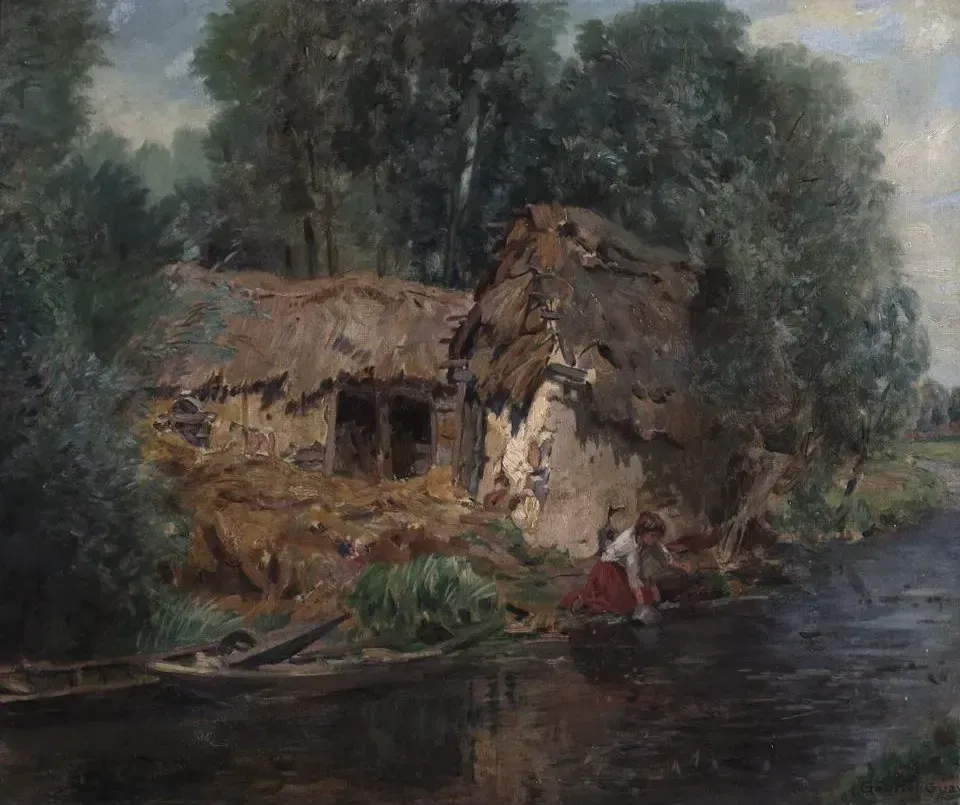
Gabriel Guay, Young Girl Gathering Water at Saint-Omer, c. 1895

The Audomarois region is closely linked to the history of the town of Saint-Omer and the nearby marshes (around 3,700 hectares of wetlands in 2010, the relics of an immense marsh drained by 160 km of "watergangs" since the early Middle Ages). In the early Middle Ages, this region developed as a counterpart to Thérouanne, around a number of major abbeys and trading centers.

The town was established and fortified in the 11th century. It lost some of its commercial importance in the 17th century, but remained an important military and religious center.

Like much of the region, the Audomarois has experienced the vicissitudes of numerous conflicts, from the Gallo-Roman period to the Second World War. Numerous traces remain, including two imposing blockhouses (Coupole d'Helfaut and Blockhaus d'Éperlecques, now places of remembrance and culture).

In the 19th century, industry (spinning mills, paper mills, etc.) boosted the demographics of the Audomar region, then in the 20th century, despite significant emigration to the nearby coalfields. Rural society then became more working-class. In the post-war period, factories were rapidly rebuilt in the Aa valley, and on the banks of the Canal de Noeufossé, an industry took off that would last until the end of the 20th century: the Verrerie-cristallerie d'Arques, which became Arc International, directly and indirectly employed up to 10,000 people in the Audomarois region, causing a spatial and landscape transformation of the Audomarois, with strong suburbanization, supported by earlyinter-community cooperation (from 1962) and marked industrialization (telephony, textiles, foundries, paper mills, etc.) and the creation of numerous new jobs. ...) and the creation of numerous housing estates, industrial zones, ZUPs (Fort-Maillebois, Saint-Martin au Laert, Arques...) and roads throughout the Audomarois region.

Saint-Omer, a "finished" town, constrained by the marsh on one side and the siliceous plateaux of Longuenesse and Helfaut on the other, had to implement a policy of urban requalification and restructuring, accompanied by the creation of new urban development on its outskirts, and in a constellation of distant villages, under the 1972 SDAU, shortly before the creation of an Urban Planning Agency (for the District of Saint-Orner) in 1974, at the initiative of the mayor of Saint-Orner and president of the District. The SDAU advocated urban requalification based on a proactive policy of real estate restoration and reconstruction linked to the elimination ofsubstandard housing in Saint-Orner, but also the construction ex nihilo of commercial urbanism and a town center outside the walls, as well as an urban "jointure" between Saint-Omer and Arques. New roads are regularly built or widened (ring road, voie nouvelle de la vallée de l'Aa (VNVA), Saint-Omer-Dunkerque and Boulogne-Saint-Orner dual carriageways, A26 freeway, developments between Saint-Omer and Lille).

These works improved access, but with few compensatory measures for the environment, aggravating the ecological fragmentation of landscapes, while since the 1980s in particular, the DRIRE and theWater Agency have been gradually pointing out some sources and after-effects of serious pollution (heavy metals in particular).

Until the 1990s, the unemployment rate in the Saint-Omer basin was below the regional and departmental average, but jobs were often low-skilled. "The boom period of new social housing on the outskirts of the town marked the end of the 1970s, and unemployment rose as industrial activity declined at the end of the "Trente Glorieuses". Demographics then declined in the center of Saint-Omer to the benefit of outlying villages and hamlets, and stabilized overall from around 1975 onwards in the Audomarois region. Thanks to OPAH housing improvements, a large proportion of the population can continue to work in or near the town. In the absence of public transport, the town is frequently clogged with car traffic, and shoppers head for the big supermarkets, well connected to the new road network.

Hypermarkets have expanded, leaving town-center retailing vulnerable, despite the efforts of traditional retail advocates such as the CCI (after they had promoted supermarkets). A new agglomeration project is set up in Saint-Omer, financed in particular by the CPER (Contrat de Plan Etat-Région), as part of the decentralization process. The project is based on a "medium-sized town file", a "reference program", culture (two high-quality museums in Saint-Omer and a "Ville d'art et d'histoire" classification) and a "cœur de pays" operation, while continuing road development and creating a river port on the Canal de Noeufossé (at Arques), and bringing the TGV (TER-GV) to Saint-Omer.

The new Master Plan takes better account of the environment. Regional planning is steered by the SMEP, which implements the Schéma Directeur with the 85 municipalities in the employment area, and the SMCO (Syndicat Mixte de la Côte d'Opale), which brings together the major conurbations along the Nord-Pas-de-Calais coast and "defends issues of regional interest".

In terms of university education, an IUT was created in 1992, in addition to private university establishments set up in 1990. In 2010, the urban core of theurban area (around 60% of the population) is made up of a number of small towns around the central city of Saint-Omer (15,000 inhabitants). The Audomarois region has few small local green spaces, but benefits from the nearby marshes and the Rihoult-Clairmarais national forest(not yet easily accessible by public transport).

Since the 1970s, intensive agriculture and the retreat of bocage and grass cover, combined with increased sealing by urbanization and roads, have increased the frequency, strength and speed of flooding. Water has taken on greater ecological importance with the installation of urban and industrial wastewater treatment plants along the Aa, and with the creation of the river contract and later the SAGE de l'Audomarois. In the 1990s, a number of nature reserves and protected areas were created (on the Plateau d'Helfaut, on the limestone hillsides and in the marshes ), while the Audomarois Regional Nature Park merged with the Boulonnais Regional Nature Park to form the Parc naturel régional des Caps et Marais d'Opale. In 2010, aneco-district project was launched in Clairmarais, between the forest and the marsh.

The Audomarois as a territory should not be confused with the Pays de Saint-Omer (larger and more recent, since it was officially created in 2004 by the voluntary grouping of 5 inter-municipal cooperation, i.e. 82 communes), which is the perimeter of a SCOT.

=== Culture, language and traditions ===
- Painters of the Audomarois region :
  - François-Nicolas Chifflart (1825–?), painter and draughtsman
- Writers :
  - Germaine Acremant (1889–1986)
- Musicians :
  - Jehan Titelouze (1563 ca −1633), musician, considered the father of French organ music.
  - Pierre Dupont (1888–1969), flutist, conductor of the Republican Guard orchestra, conductor of the Courrières mine band, vice-president of SACEM.
- Scientists :
  - Joseph Liouville (1809–1882), mathematician
  - Joseph Bienaimé Caventou (1795–1887), chemist-pharmacist, co-discoverer of quinine.
- Language:

Picardy is spoken on the left bank of the Aa, while the right bank has long spoken West Flemish (Lysel and Haut-Pont districts of Saint-Omer).

- Traditions :
  - The 15 August pilgrimage to the "Notre-Dame de Lourdes " grotto in Clairmarais attracts over 50,000 visitors every year. The cement grotto was built in 1935 by an Assumptionist father.
  - The Cortège Nautique du Haut-Pont, supported by the Regional Nature Park, is a procession of flat-bottomed boats on the canalised Aa between Saint-Omer and Clairmarais. The boats feature structures evoking scenes or characters such as Marie Grouette, and are decorated with thousands of crepe flowers.

=== Terroirs and production ===
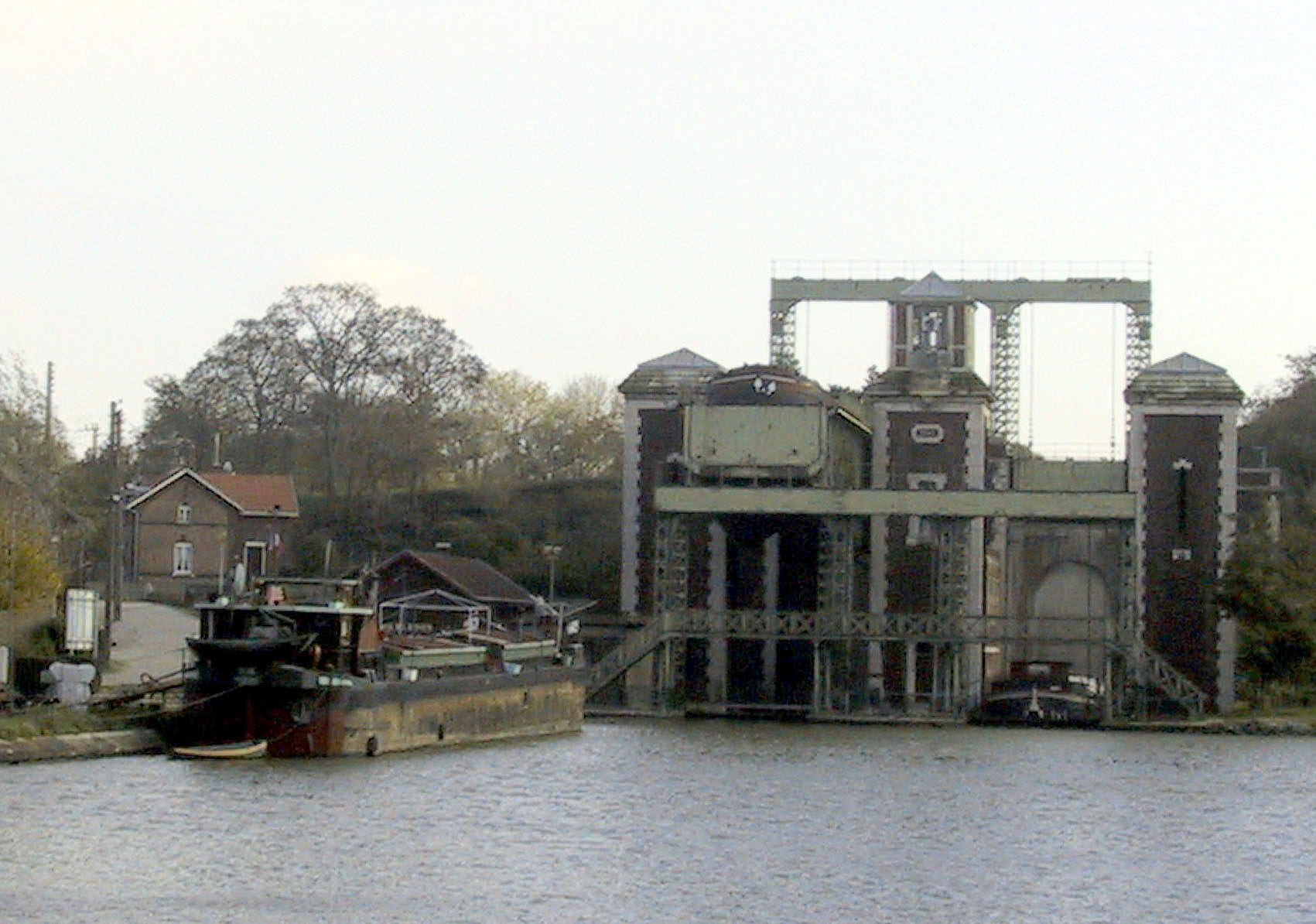
Fontinettes boat lift.

Geological resources have enabled the development of long-established activities: cement works, lime kilns, peat extraction in the marshes, clay extraction for tile-making.

=== Landscapes and traditional architecture ===
The Audomarois is a relatively flat region of marshes or former marshes, relics of forests and scattered settlements, surrounded by a few plateaus (Helfaut plateau, Longuenesse plateau separated by the Aa valley). In the marsh, small market-gardener houses and canals or watergangs are typical of the local landscape. Mills also played an important role in draining the marshes.

The Audomarois is one of the landscapes included in the 2008 Regional Landscape Atlas.

=== Animals and plants associated with the land ===
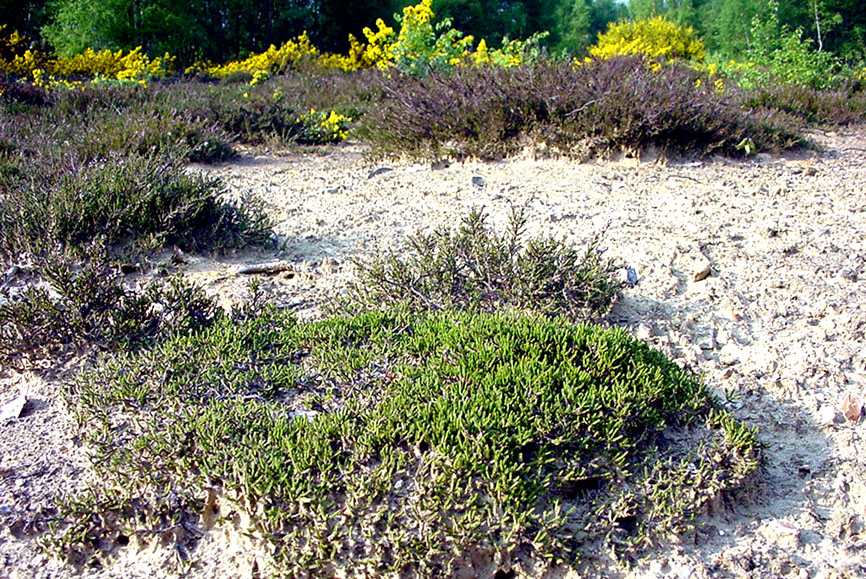
The Landes d'Helfaut nature reserve.

Vegetable production can be distinguished from local flora and fauna.

The Audomarois is France's leading market-garden area, with the cultivation of cauliflower, chicory, Tilques carrots, potatoes, zucchinis, aromatic plants, apples, pears, plums, red fruits.

The Audomarois region offers a wide variety of habitats, with a rich diversity of birds, insects, bats, etc.

- The marshes, made up of wetlands, are home to many species, including the rare Least bittern, emblem of the Regional Nature Park.
- The Landes d'Helfaut are limestone environments.

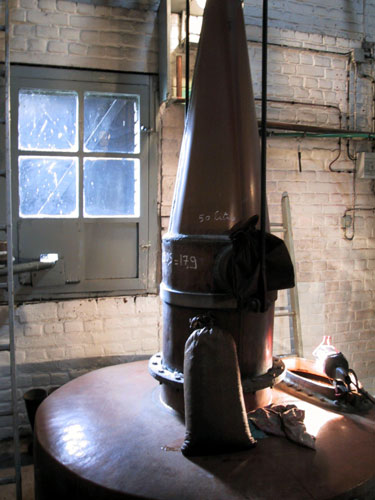
The Houlle Jenever.

=== Gastronomy ===
- Houlle Jenever
- Beer from Saint-Omer

== Recent developments ==
With the gradual disappearance of the market gardeners who helped to maintain the marsh landscape, the Audomarois marshes have become more commonplace, with the introduction of cereal crops and the filling in of ditches. The creation of the Réserve naturelle nationale des étangs du Romelaëre (Romelaëre ponds national nature reserve ) has helped to preserve the marsh's typical flora and fauna.

The phenomenon of suburbanization from the Saint-Omer conurbation to Éperlecques is exacerbating habitat sprawl in the Audomarois.

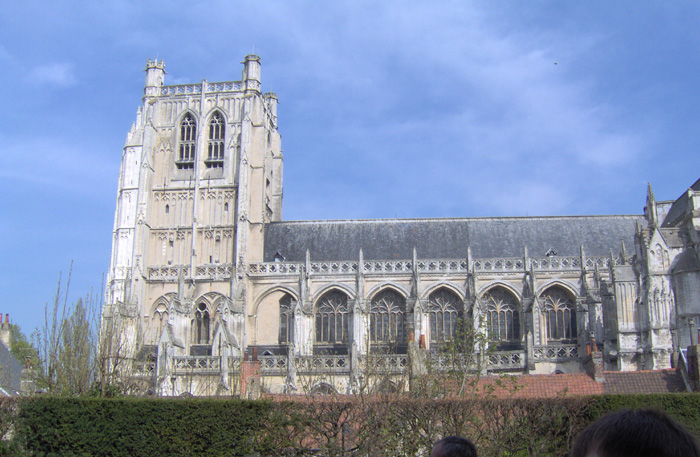
Saint-Omer Cathedral.

== Sites ==
- Etangs du Romelaëre National Nature Reserve
- Marais Audomarois
- Arc Holdings
- Fontinettes boat lift
- Blockhaus d'Éperlecques
- Aa river
- La Coupole
- Landes d'Helfaut nature reserve
- Saint-Omer Cathedral

== See also ==
- Arques, Pas-de-Calais
- Blendecques
- Éperlecques
- Helfaut
- Houlle
- Longuenesse
- Saint-Omer
- Watten
- Campagne-lès-Wardrecques
- Saint-Martin-au-Laërt
- Cuisine and specialties of Nord-Pas-de-Calais

== Bibliography ==
- de Heaulme, Chr. (2013). Saint-Omer : un marais de maraîchers (in French). Alim'agri, magazine du Ministère de l'agriculture, de l'agroalimentaire et de la forêt.
- Commission locale de l'eau. Schéma d'Aménagement et de Gestion des Eaux de l'Audomarois (S.A.G.E.) (in French).
