= Bayenghem-lès-Éperlecques =

Bayenghem-lès-Éperlecques Baaiengem
- Commune
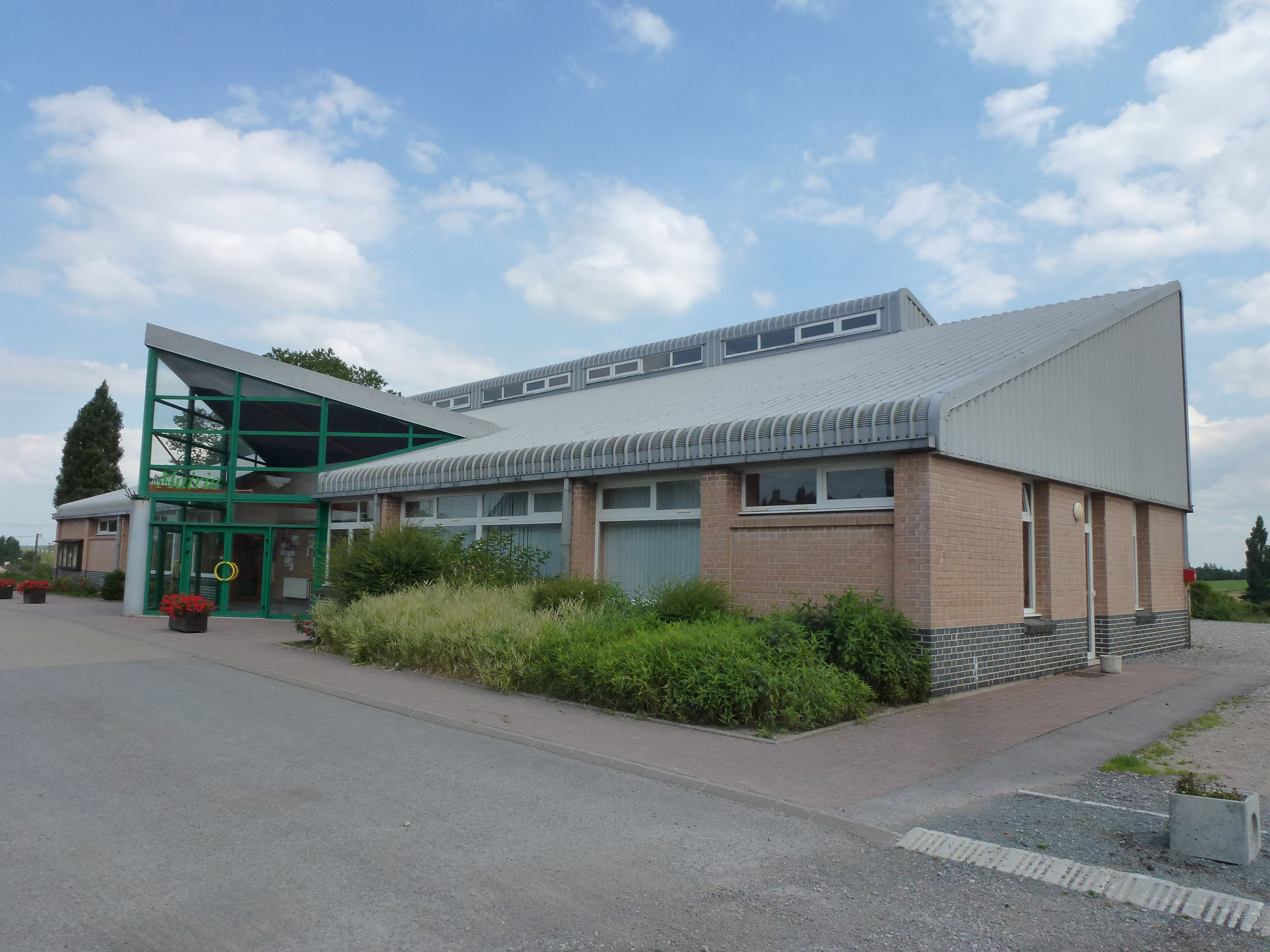
- The town hall of Bayenghem-lès-Éperlecques

- Coat of arms
- Location of Bayenghem-lès-Éperlecques
- Location within France Location within Hauts-de-France
- Coordinates: 50°48′28″N 2°07′30″E
- Country: France
- Region: Hauts-de-France
- Department: Pas-de-Calais
- Arrondissement: Saint-Omer
- Canton: Saint-Omer
- Intercommunality: CA Pays de Saint-Omer

Government
  - Mayor (2020–2026): Jean-Michel Bouhin
- Area^{1}: 4.51 km^{2} (1.74 sq mi)
- Elevation: 55 m (180 ft)
- Highest elevation: 92 m (302 ft)
- Lowest elevation: 12 m (39 ft)
- Population (2023): 1,018
  - Density: 226/km^{2} (585/sq mi)
- Time zone: UTC+01:00 (CET)
  - Summer (DST): UTC+02:00 (CEST)
- INSEE/Postal code: 62087 /62910
- ^{1} French Land Register data, which excludes lakes, ponds, glaciers > 1 km^{2} (0.386 sq mi or 247 acres) and river estuaries.

Bayenghem-lès-Éperlecques (French pronunciation: [bajɑ̃ɡɑ̃ lɛ.z‿epɛʁlɛk], literally Bayenghem near Éperlecques; West Flemish: Baaiengem) is a commune in the Pas-de-Calais department in the Hauts-de-France region in northern France.

== Geography ==
The village is located some 13 km (8.1 mi) northwest of Saint-Omer, on the D221 road, close to the D943 and the A16 autoroute.

== Population ==
Historical population
Year	Pop.	±% p.a.
1968	418	—
1975	392	−0.91%
1982	468	+2.56%
1990	637	+3.93%
1999	687	+0.84%
2007	921	+3.73%
2012	968	+1.00%
2017	1,009	+0.83%
2023	1,018	+0.15%
Source: INSEE

== Sights ==
- The eighteenth century church of St. Wandrille.
- Traces of a motte-and-bailey castle.

== See also ==
- Communes of the Pas-de-Calais department
