= Clairmarais aerodrome =

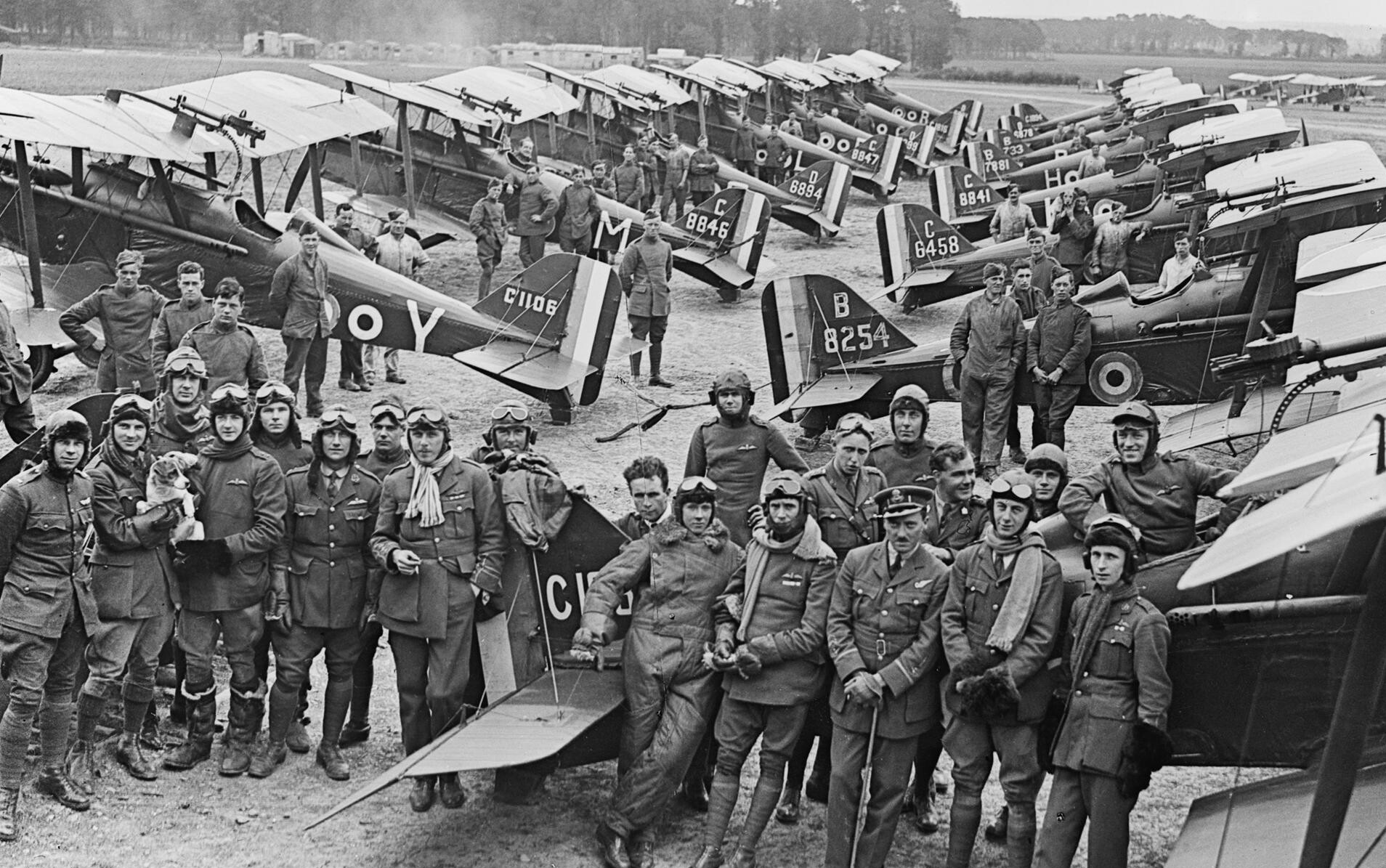
- Officers of No 1 Squadron, RAF with SE5a biplanes at Clairmarais aerodrome, July 1918. Picture taken by 2nd Lt D McLellan.
- IATA: none; ICAO: none

Summary
- Airport type: Military airfield
- Location: Clairmarais, Pas-de-Calais, France
- In use: First World War
- Occupants: Royal Flying Corps/ Royal Air Force
- Coordinates: 50°46′20″N 02°19′30″E
- Interactive map of Clairmarais aerodrome

Clairmarais aerodrome (also known as Clairmarais North, not to be confused with the newer Clairmarais South), at Clairmarais, Pas-de-Calais, France, near St. Omer and not far from Ypres, was an airfield used by the Royal Flying Corps (RFC) and later Royal Air Force (RAF) in the First World War. The site was briefly reused by the Germans during the occupation of France in the Second World War.

== First World War ==
Clairmarais aerodrome (at Clairmarais, Pas-de-Calais) was used by the Royal Flying Corps (RFC) and later the Royal Air Force (RAF) during the First World War. RFC/ RAF squadrons 1, 20, 27, 49, 54, 58, 65, 74 and 98 were all stationed at the aerodrome at some point or other, as were No. 9 Squadron Royal Naval Air Service (later No. 209 Squadron RAF) and No. 4 Squadron Australian Flying Corps.

The flight during which Thomas Mottershead earned his Victoria Cross, and as a result of which he died, took off from Clairmarais aerodrome in a Royal Aircraft Factory F.E.2d on 7 January 1917. Fighter ace Harry Cobby, later Air Commodore Arthur Henry Cobby, CBE, DSO, DFC & Two Bars, GM, claimed almost half of his kills while based at Clairmarais aerodrome.

A photograph of pilots of No. 1 Squadron Royal Air Force and their Royal Aircraft Factory S.E.5a Scouts at the airfield, taken by 2nd Lt David McLellan in July 1918, is in the collection of the Imperial War Museum. This photograph, with the aircraft drawn up tail-to-tail, established a tradition for No. 1 Squadron, which has used the same format for squadron photographs in the succeeding decades.

== Second World War ==
During World War II, the airfield was rebuilt for use by the Luftwaffe as a satellite of their main St. Omer fighter air station, which was situated between Longuenesse and Wizernes; there was no hardened runway at Clairmarais and the damp ground conditions made it unusable in wet weather. A small hangar made of corrugated iron was disguised as a church. On the south side of the airfield was a dispersal area equipped with more than thirty aircraft revetments. The airfield was used by Jagdgeschwader 26 during 1940 and 1941, but had become disused by 1942. Allied photographic reconnaissance in March 1944 showed that the runway had been permanently obstructed by trenches and mine craters.
