= Zouafques =

Zouafques Zwaveke
- Commune
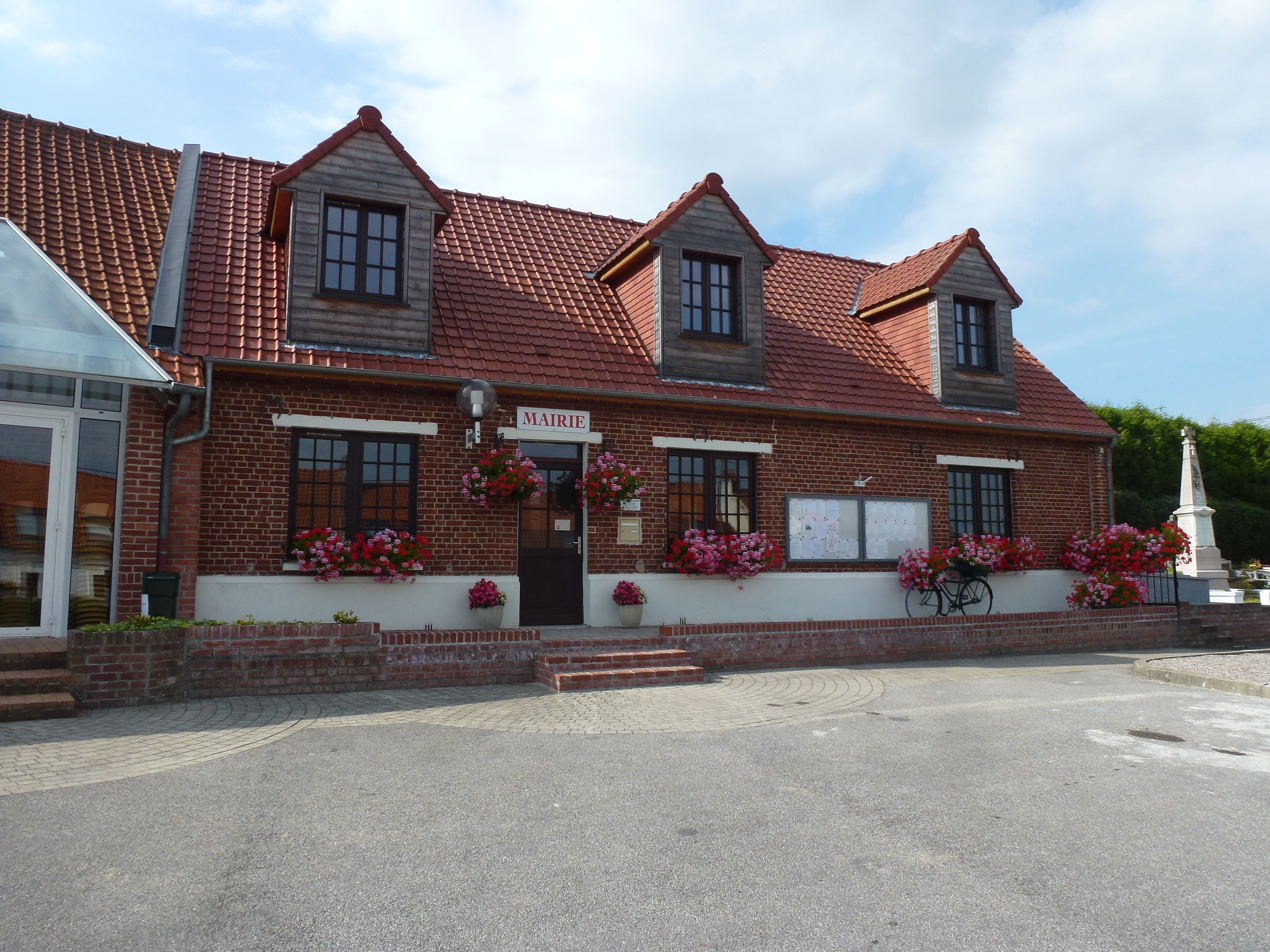
- The town hall of Zouafques

- Coat of arms
- Location of Zouafques
- Location within France Location within Hauts-de-France
- Coordinates: 50°49′01″N 2°03′24″E
- Country: France
- Region: Hauts-de-France
- Department: Pas-de-Calais
- Arrondissement: Saint-Omer
- Canton: Saint-Omer
- Intercommunality: Pays de Saint-Omer

Government
  - Mayor (2020–2026): Franck Dupont
- Area^{1}: 3.93 km^{2} (1.52 sq mi)
- Elevation: 19 m (62 ft)
- Highest elevation: 72 m (236 ft)
- Lowest elevation: 15 m (49 ft)
- Population (2023): 592
  - Density: 151/km^{2} (390/sq mi)
- Demonym(s): Zouafquois, Zouafquoises
- Time zone: UTC+01:00 (CET)
  - Summer (DST): UTC+02:00 (CEST)
- INSEE/Postal code: 62904 /62890
- ^{1} French Land Register data, which excludes lakes, ponds, glaciers > 1 km^{2} (0.386 sq mi or 247 acres) and river estuaries.

Zouafques (French pronunciation: [zwafk]; West Flemish: Zwaveke; Picard: Zuave) is a commune in the Pas-de-Calais department in the Hauts-de-France region of France.

== Geography ==
Zouafques is located 11 miles (18 km) northwest of Saint-Omer, at the D217 road junction with the A26 autoroute, in the valley of the small river Hem.

== Population ==
Historical population

Year	Pop.	±% p.a.
1793	329	—
1821	434	+0.99%
1846	497	+0.54%
1872	465	−0.26%
1901	427	−0.29%
1926	396	−0.30%
1946	416	+0.25%
1962	348	−1.11%
1968	364	+0.75%

Year	Pop.	±% p.a.
1975	357	−0.28%
1982	351	−0.24%
1990	363	+0.42%
1999	415	+1.50%
2007	523	+2.93%
2012	609	+3.09%
2017	609	+0.00%
2023	592	−0.47%

Source: EHESS (1793-1999) and INSEE

== Places of interest ==
- The church of St.Martin, dating from the nineteenth century.
- A watermill.
- An eighteenth century dovecote.

== Transport ==
The Chemin de fer d'Anvin à Calais opened a railway station at Zouafques in 1881. The railway was closed in 1955.

== See also ==
- Communes of the Pas-de-Calais department
