= Tatinghem =

Commune in Pas-de-Calais, France

Tatinghem Tatingem
- Part of Saint-Martin-lez-Tatinghem
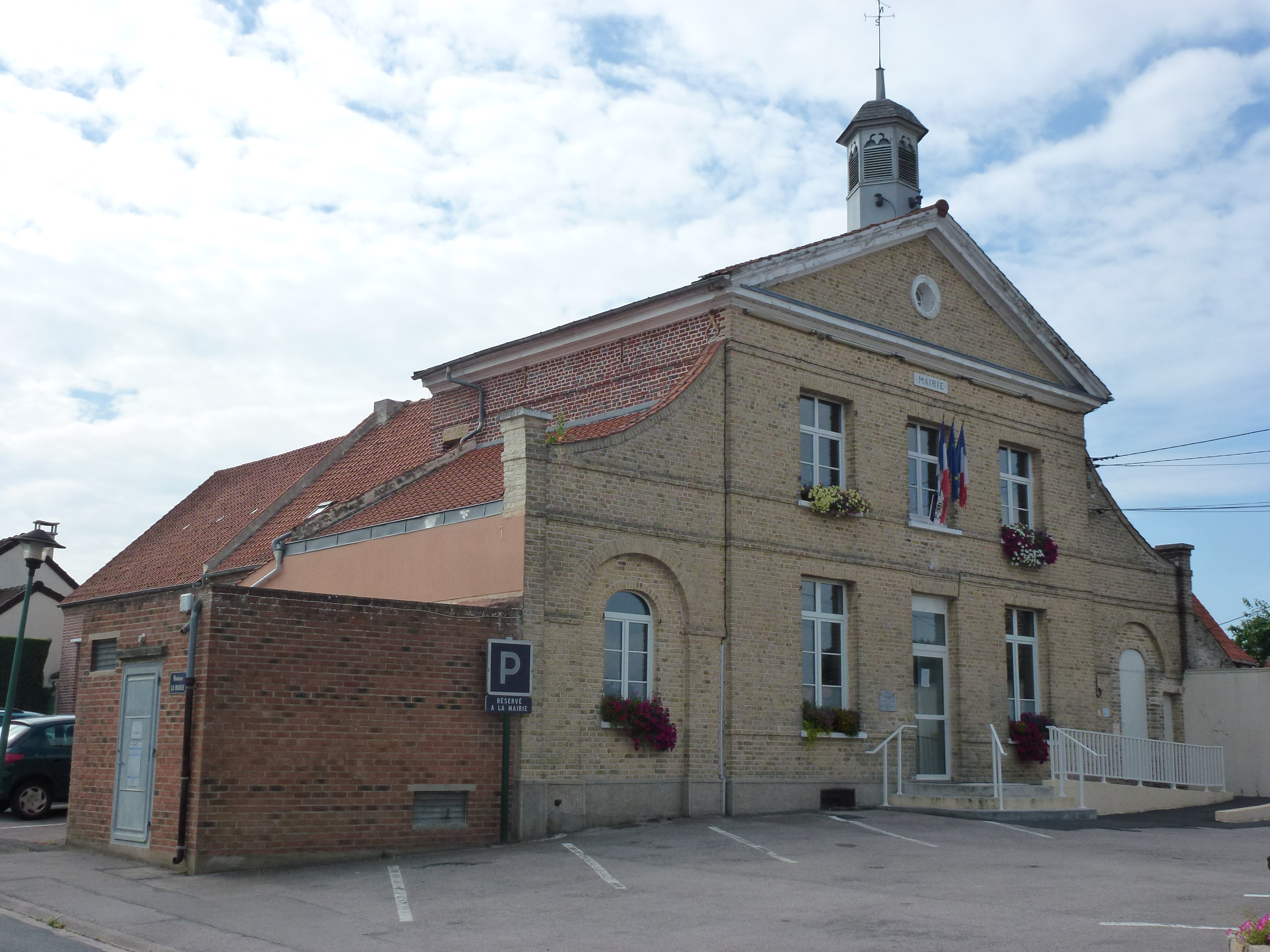
- Mairie
- Location of Tatinghem
- Location within France Location within Hauts-de-France
- Coordinates: 50°44′41″N 2°12′32″E
- Country: France
- Region: Hauts-de-France
- Department: Pas-de-Calais
- Arrondissement: Saint-Omer
- Canton: Saint-Omer
- Commune: Saint-Martin-lez-Tatinghem
- Area^{1}: 5.6 km^{2} (2.2 sq mi)
- Elevation: 48 m (157 ft)
- Highest elevation: 88 m (289 ft)
- Lowest elevation: 24 m (79 ft)
- Population (2018): 1,837
  - Density: 330/km^{2} (850/sq mi)
- Time zone: UTC+01:00 (CET)
  - Summer (DST): UTC+02:00 (CEST)
- Postal code: 62500
- ^{1} French Land Register data, which excludes lakes, ponds, glaciers > 1 km^{2} (0.386 sq mi or 247 acres) and river estuaries.

Tatinghem (French pronunciation: [tatɛ̃ɡɛm]; West Flemish: Tatingem, Picard: Tatinghin) is a former commune in the Pas-de-Calais department in northern France. On 1 January 2016, it was merged into the new commune Saint-Martin-lez-Tatinghem.

== Geography ==
Tatinghem is located just 2 miles (3 km) west of Saint-Omer, on the D208 road.

== Population ==
Historical population
Year	Pop.	±% p.a.
1962	693	—
1968	962	+5.62%
1975	925	−0.56%
1982	1,462	+6.76%
1990	1,589	+1.05%
1999	1,722	+0.90%
2006	1,796	+0.60%
2018	1,837	+0.19%
Source: EHESS and INSEE

== Places of interest ==
- The church of Saint Jacques, dating from the seventeenth century.
- The eighteenth-century château.

== See also ==
- Communes of the Pas-de-Calais department
