= Saint-Martin-lez-Tatinghem =

- Commune
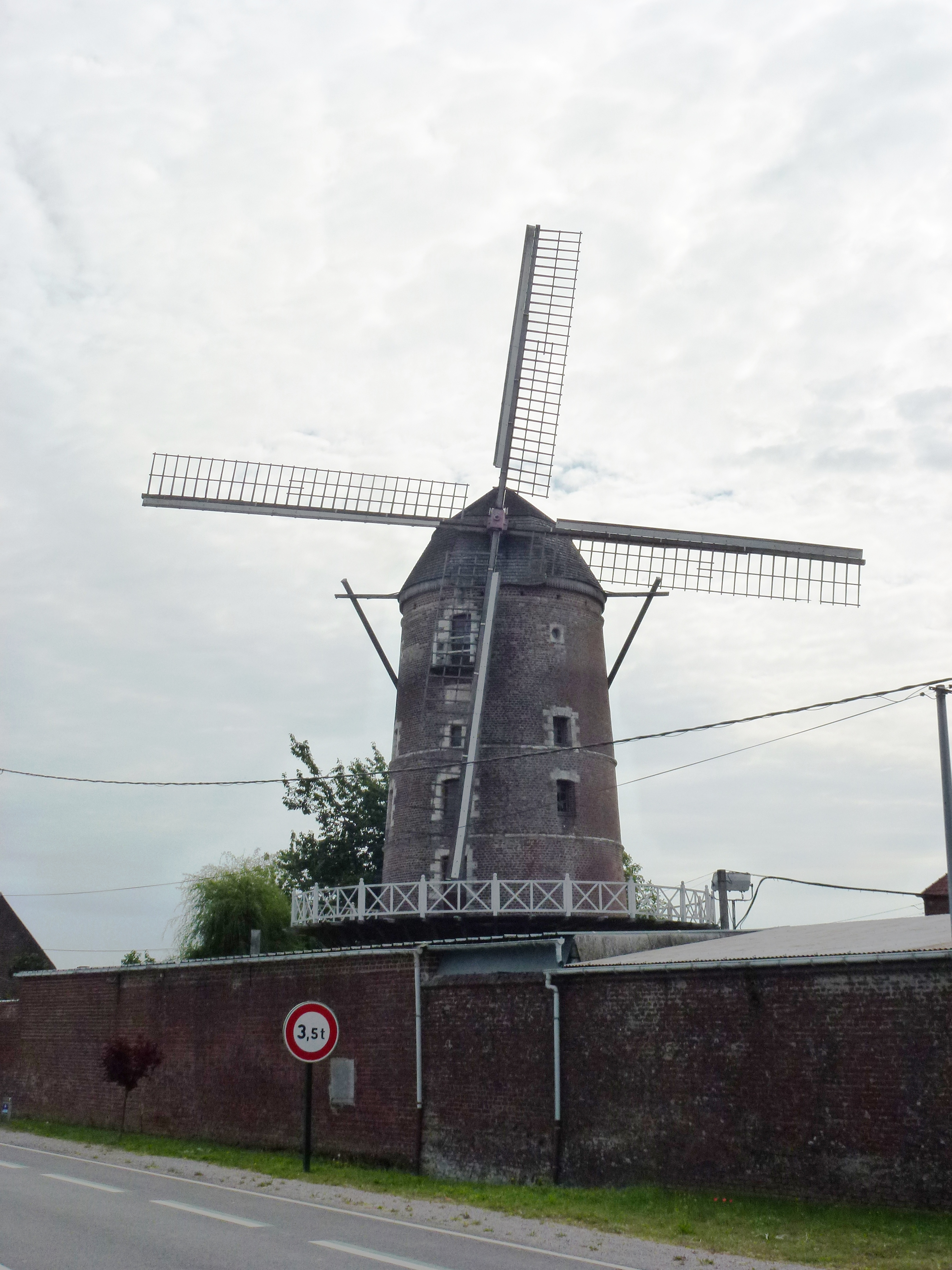
- The windmill of Saint-Martin
- Location of Saint-Martin-lez-Tatinghem
- Location within France Location within Hauts-de-France
- Coordinates: 50°45′14″N 2°14′17″E
- Country: France
- Region: Hauts-de-France
- Department: Pas-de-Calais
- Arrondissement: Saint-Omer
- Canton: Saint-Omer
- Intercommunality: Pays de Saint-Omer

Government
  - Mayor (2023–2026): Patrick Tillier
- Area^{1}: 11.54 km^{2} (4.46 sq mi)
- Population (2023): 5,843
  - Density: 506.3/km^{2} (1,311/sq mi)
- Time zone: UTC+01:00 (CET)
  - Summer (DST): UTC+02:00 (CEST)
- INSEE/Postal code: 62757 /62500
- ^{1} French Land Register data, which excludes lakes, ponds, glaciers > 1 km^{2} (0.386 sq mi or 247 acres) and river estuaries.

Saint-Martin-lez-Tatinghem (French pronunciation: [sɛ̃ maʁtɛ̃ le tatɛ̃ɡɛm], literally Saint-Martin near Tatinghem) is a commune in the Pas-de-Calais department of northern France. The municipality was established on 1 January 2016 and consists of the former communes of Saint-Martin-au-Laërt and Tatinghem.

== Population ==
Population data refer to the area corresponding with the commune as of January 2025.

Historical population
Year	Pop.	±% p.a.
1968	3,726	—
1975	5,782	+6.48%
1982	5,860	+0.19%
1990	5,848	−0.03%
1999	5,643	−0.40%
2007	5,627	−0.04%
2012	5,631	+0.01%
2017	5,906	+0.96%
2023	5,843	−0.18%
Source: INSEE

== See also ==
- Communes of the Pas-de-Calais department
