= Nordausques =

Nordausques Noordelseke
- Commune
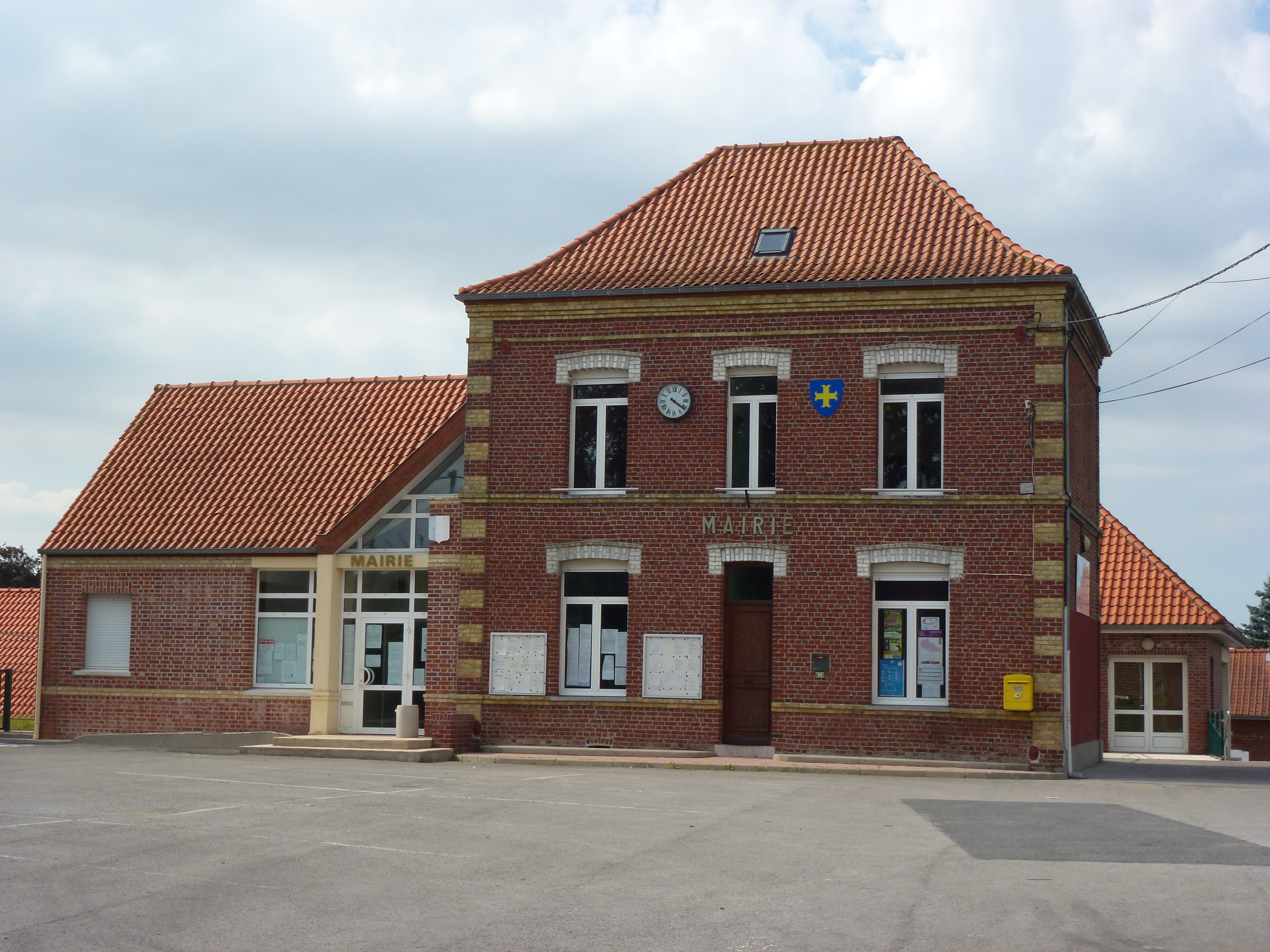
- The town hall of Nordausques

- Coat of arms
- Location of Nordausques
- Location within France Location within Hauts-de-France
- Coordinates: 50°49′06″N 2°04′57″E
- Country: France
- Region: Hauts-de-France
- Department: Pas-de-Calais
- Arrondissement: Saint-Omer
- Canton: Saint-Omer
- Intercommunality: Pays de Saint-Omer

Government
  - Mayor (2020–2026): Gilles Debove
- Area^{1}: 5.94 km^{2} (2.29 sq mi)
- Elevation: 85 m (279 ft)
- Highest elevation: 98 m (322 ft)
- Lowest elevation: 12 m (39 ft)
- Population (2023): 1,271
  - Density: 214/km^{2} (554/sq mi)
- Time zone: UTC+01:00 (CET)
  - Summer (DST): UTC+02:00 (CEST)
- INSEE/Postal code: 62618 /62890
- ^{1} French Land Register data, which excludes lakes, ponds, glaciers > 1 km^{2} (0.386 sq mi or 247 acres) and river estuaries.

Nordausques (French pronunciation: [nɔʁdosk]; West Flemish: Noordelseke) is a commune in the Pas-de-Calais department in the Hauts-de-France region of France about 10 miles (16 km) northwest of Saint-Omer, on the banks of the small river Hem.

== Population ==
Historical population
Year	Pop.	±% p.a.
1968	434	—
1975	514	+2.45%
1982	527	+0.36%
1990	588	+1.38%
1999	633	+0.82%
2007	836	+3.54%
2012	1,078	+5.22%
2017	1,273	+3.38%
2023	1,271	−0.03%
Source: INSEE

== See also ==
- Communes of the Pas-de-Calais department
