= Salperwick =

Salperwick Salperwijk
- Commune
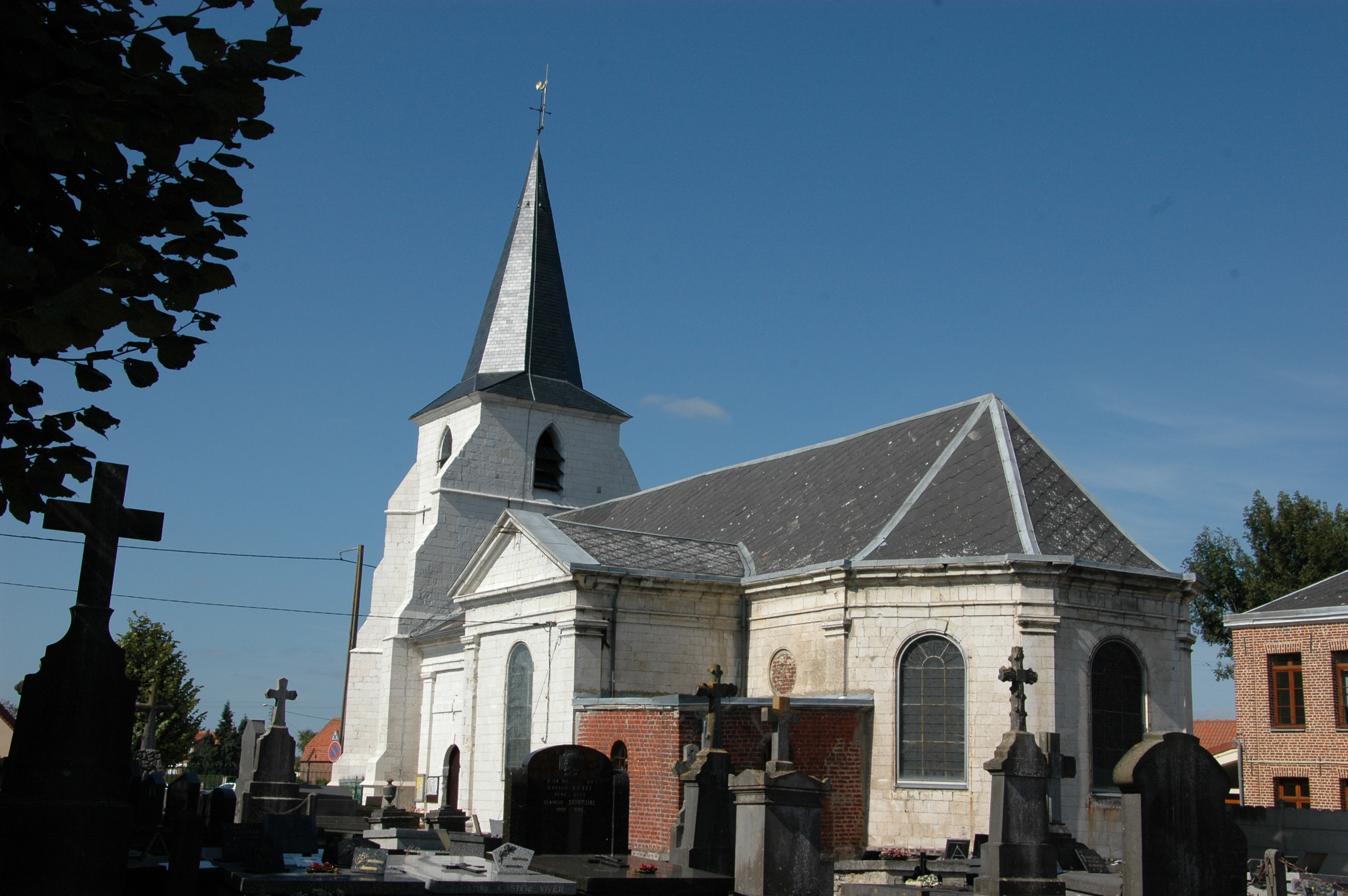
- The church of Salperwick

- Coat of arms
- Location of Salperwick
- Location within France Location within Hauts-de-France
- Coordinates: 50°46′24″N 2°13′58″E
- Country: France
- Region: Hauts-de-France
- Department: Pas-de-Calais
- Arrondissement: Saint-Omer
- Canton: Saint-Omer
- Intercommunality: Pays de Saint-Omer

Government
  - Mayor (2020–2026): Michel Martinot
- Area^{1}: 4 km^{2} (1.5 sq mi)
- Elevation: 10 m (33 ft)
- Highest elevation: 71 m (233 ft)
- Lowest elevation: 1 m (3.3 ft)
- Population (2023): 521
  - Density: 130/km^{2} (340/sq mi)
- Time zone: UTC+01:00 (CET)
  - Summer (DST): UTC+02:00 (CEST)
- INSEE/Postal code: 62772 /62500
- ^{1} French Land Register data, which excludes lakes, ponds, glaciers > 1 km^{2} (0.386 sq mi or 247 acres) and river estuaries.

Salperwick (French pronunciation: [salpɛʁwik]; West Flemish: Salperwijk) is a commune in the Pas-de-Calais department in the Hauts-de-France region of France.

== Geography ==
Salperwick is built on land reclaimed from the marshes, 2 miles (3 km) to the north of Saint-Omer on the D214E1 road.

== Population ==
Historical population
Year	Pop.	±% p.a.
1968	261	—
1975	302	+2.11%
1982	291	−0.53%
1990	294	+0.13%
1999	486	+5.74%
2007	492	+0.15%
2012	511	+0.76%
2017	486	−1.00%
2023	521	+1.17%
Source: INSEE

== Places of interest ==
- The church of Notre-Dame, dating from the sixteenth century.
- The eighteenth-century château where Napoleon stayed on 27–28 August 1804, after having left Boulogne. The chateau belongs to the family of the Count de Guillebon.

== See also ==
- Communes of the Pas-de-Calais department
