= Moulle =

Moulle Monnie
- Commune
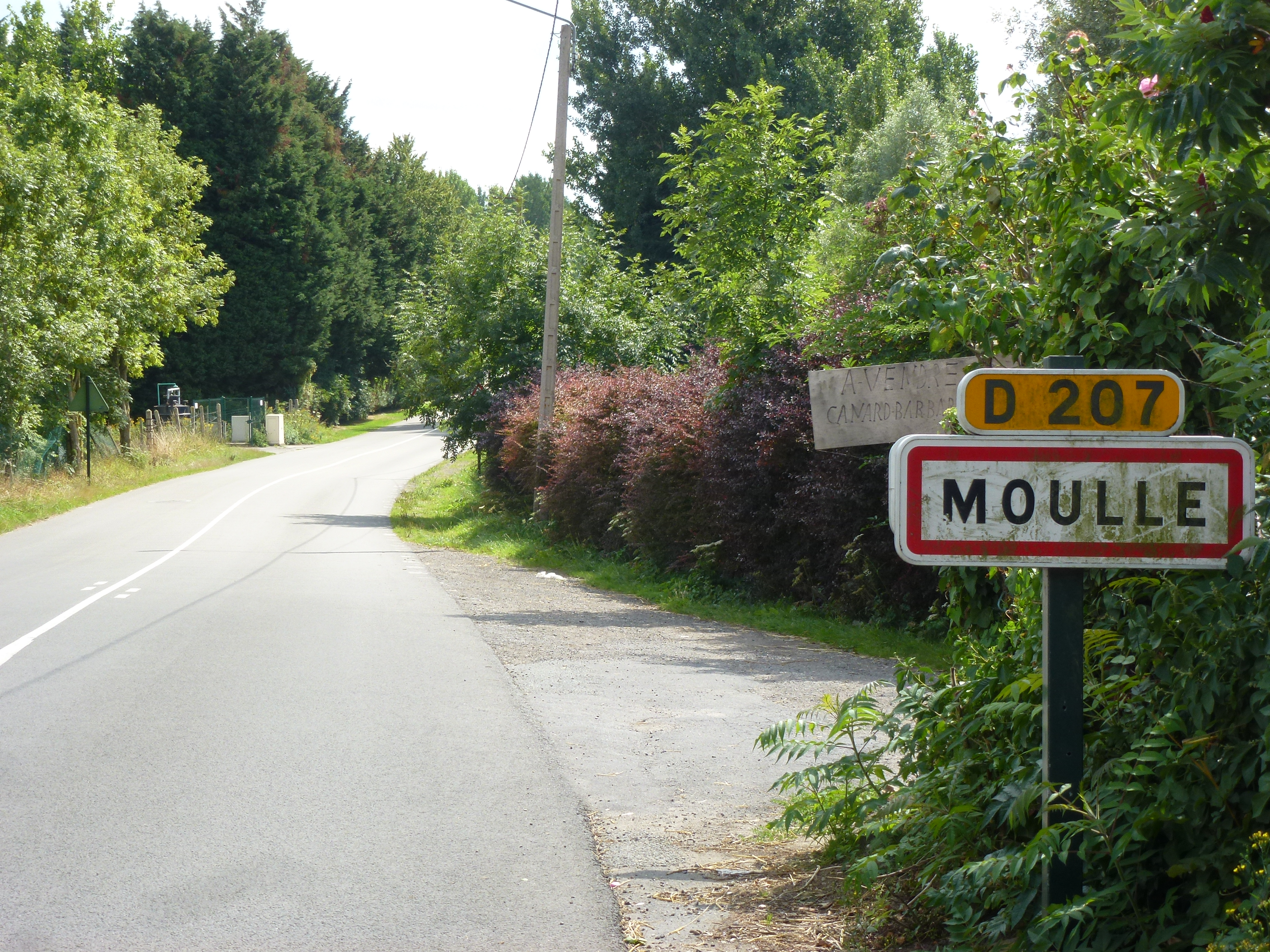
- City limit sign

- Coat of arms
- Location of Moulle
- Location within France Location within Hauts-de-France
- Coordinates: 50°47′20″N 2°10′44″E
- Country: France
- Region: Hauts-de-France
- Department: Pas-de-Calais
- Arrondissement: Saint-Omer
- Canton: Saint-Omer
- Intercommunality: Pays de Saint-Omer

Government
  - Mayor (2024–2026): Veronique Briois
- Area^{1}: 5.39 km^{2} (2.08 sq mi)
- Elevation: 16 m (52 ft)
- Highest elevation: 72 m (236 ft)
- Lowest elevation: 0 m (0 ft)
- Population (2023): 1,170
  - Density: 217/km^{2} (562/sq mi)
- Time zone: UTC+01:00 (CET)
  - Summer (DST): UTC+02:00 (CEST)
- INSEE/Postal code: 62595 /62910
- ^{1} French Land Register data, which excludes lakes, ponds, glaciers > 1 km^{2} (0.386 sq mi or 247 acres) and river estuaries.

Moulle (French pronunciation: [mul]; West Flemish: Monnie) is a commune in the Pas-de-Calais department in the Hauts-de-France region of France about 5 miles (8 km) northwest of Saint-Omer.

== Population ==
Historical population
| Year | Pop. | ±% p.a. |
|---|---|---|
| 1968 | 802 | — |
| 1975 | 762 | −0.73% |
| 1982 | 828 | +1.19% |
| 1990 | 853 | +0.37% |
| 1999 | 909 | +0.71% |
| 2007 | 919 | +0.14% |
| 2012 | 1,049 | +2.68% |
| 2017 | 1,117 | +1.26% |
| 2023 | 1,170 | +0.78% |
Source: INSEE

== See also ==
- Communes of the Pas-de-Calais department
