= Tournehem-sur-la-Hem =

Tournehem-sur-la-Hem Doornem
- Commune
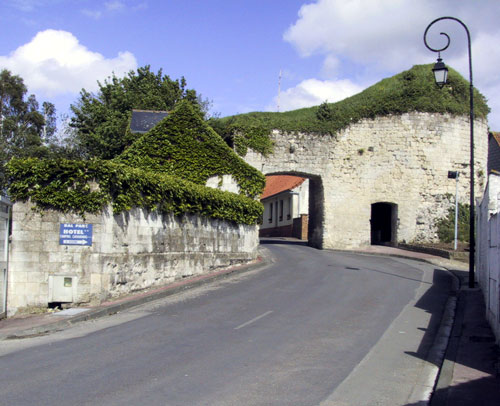
- Town fortifications

- Coat of arms
- Location of Tournehem-sur-la-Hem
- Location within France Location within Hauts-de-France
- Coordinates: 50°48′26″N 2°02′57″E
- Country: France
- Region: Hauts-de-France
- Department: Pas-de-Calais
- Arrondissement: Saint-Omer
- Canton: Saint-Omer
- Intercommunality: Pays de Saint-Omer

Government
  - Mayor (2020–2026): Jean Paul Vasseur
- Area^{1}: 18.14 km^{2} (7.00 sq mi)
- Elevation: 39 m (128 ft)
- Highest elevation: 174 m (571 ft)
- Lowest elevation: 22 m (72 ft)
- Population (2023): 1,376
  - Density: 75.85/km^{2} (196.5/sq mi)
- Time zone: UTC+01:00 (CET)
  - Summer (DST): UTC+02:00 (CEST)
- INSEE/Postal code: 62827 /62890
- ^{1} French Land Register data, which excludes lakes, ponds, glaciers > 1 km^{2} (0.386 sq mi or 247 acres) and river estuaries.

Tournehem-sur-la-Hem (West Flemish: Doornem) is a commune in the Pas-de-Calais department in the Hauts-de-France region of France.

== Geography ==
Tournehem-sur-la-Hem is located 10 miles (16 km) northwest of Saint-Omer, at the D217 and D218 road junction, on the banks of the river Hem.

== Population ==
Historical population
Year	Pop.	±% p.a.
1968	835	—
1975	965	+2.09%
1982	1,018	+0.77%
1990	1,069	+0.61%
1999	1,219	+1.47%
2007	1,270	+0.51%
2012	1,423	+2.30%
2017	1,436	+0.18%
2023	1,376	−0.71%
Source: INSEE

== Places of interest ==
- The church of Saint Médard, dating from the fifteenth, seventeenth and eighteenth century, now a historical monument.
- The ruins of the 12th-century château which was destroyed in 1542.
- The area also has some windmills, such as the Moulin à vent Bacquet.
- The eighteenth-century château at Guémy.
- The church of Notre-Dame at Guémy, dating from the eighteenth century.
- The ruins of the 13th-century chapel of Guémy on Saint Louis Mount, which has extensive views of the area

== Transport ==
The Chemin de fer d'Anvin à Calais opened a railway station at Tournehem-sur-la-Hem in 1881. The railway was closed in 1955.

== See also ==
- Communes of the Pas-de-Calais department
