= Éperlecques =

Éperlecques Sperleke
- Commune
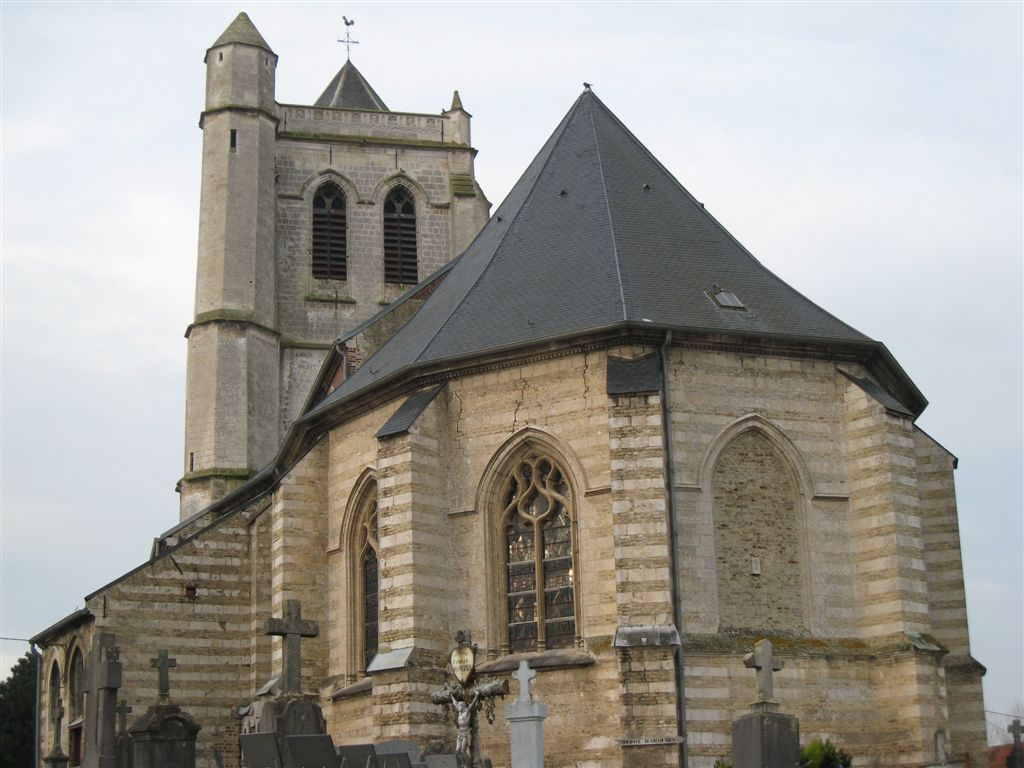
- St. Leodegar's Church

- Coat of arms
- Location of Éperlecques
- Location within France Location within Hauts-de-France
- Coordinates: 50°48′25″N 2°09′09″E
- Country: France
- Region: Hauts-de-France
- Department: Pas-de-Calais
- Arrondissement: Saint-Omer
- Canton: Saint-Omer
- Intercommunality: Pays de Saint-Omer

Government
  - Mayor (2020–2026): Laurent Denis
- Area^{1}: 25.56 km^{2} (9.87 sq mi)
- Elevation: 15 m (49 ft)
- Highest elevation: 97 m (318 ft)
- Lowest elevation: 0 m (0 ft)
- Population (2023): 3,737
  - Density: 146.2/km^{2} (378.7/sq mi)
- Time zone: UTC+01:00 (CET)
  - Summer (DST): UTC+02:00 (CEST)
- INSEE/Postal code: 62297 /62910
- ^{1} French Land Register data, which excludes lakes, ponds, glaciers > 1 km^{2} (0.386 sq mi or 247 acres) and river estuaries.

Éperlecques (French pronunciation: [epɛʁlɛk]; West Flemish: Sperleke; Picard: Éparlecques) is a commune in the Pas-de-Calais department in the Hauts-de-France region of France.

== Geography ==
It is a farming commune comprising eight hamlets, all found within the regional nature reserve of the Caps et Marais d'Opale, situated 6 miles (10 km) northwest of Saint-Omer, at the D222 and D219 road junction. The small river Liette runs through the village.

== Population ==
Historical population
Year	Pop.	±% p.a.
1968	2,168	—
1975	2,276	+0.70%
1982	2,556	+1.67%
1990	2,785	+1.08%
1999	2,885	+0.39%
2007	3,135	+1.04%
2012	3,350	+1.34%
2017	3,640	+1.67%
2023	3,737	+0.44%
Source: INSEE

== Places of interest ==
- The Blockhaus d'Éperlecques
- St. Leodegar's church, dating from the sixteenth century.
- Seven chapels.
- Traces of ancient châteaux.
- The flour mill at Seigre.

== Twin towns ==
Éperlecques is twinned with Zonnebeke in Belgium.

== See also ==
- Audomarois
- Communes of the Pas-de-Calais department
