= Canton of Saint-Omer =

Coordinates: 50.75°N 2.25°E

The canton of Saint-Omer is an administrative division of the Pas-de-Calais department, in northern France. It was created at the French canton reorganisation which came into effect in March 2015. Its seat is in Saint-Omer.

It comprises the following communes:

1. Bayenghem-lès-Éperlecques (Baaiengem)
2. Clairmarais (Klaarmares)
3. Éperlecques (Sperleke)
4. Houlle (Holne)
5. Mentque-Nortbécourt (Menteke-Noordboekhout)
6. Moringhem (Moringem)
7. Moulle (Monnie)
8. Nordausques (Noord-Elseke)
9. Nort-Leulinghem (Noordleulingem)
10. Saint-Martin-au-Laërt (Sint-Maartens-Aard)
11. Saint-Martin-lez-Tatinghem
12. Saint-Omer (Sint-Omaars)
13. Salperwick (Salperwijk)
14. Serques (Zegerke)
15. Tatinghem (Tatingem)
16. Tilques (Tilleke)
17. Tournehem-sur-la-Hem (Doornem)
18. Zouafques (Zwaveke)
