= Tilques =

Tilques Tileke
- Commune
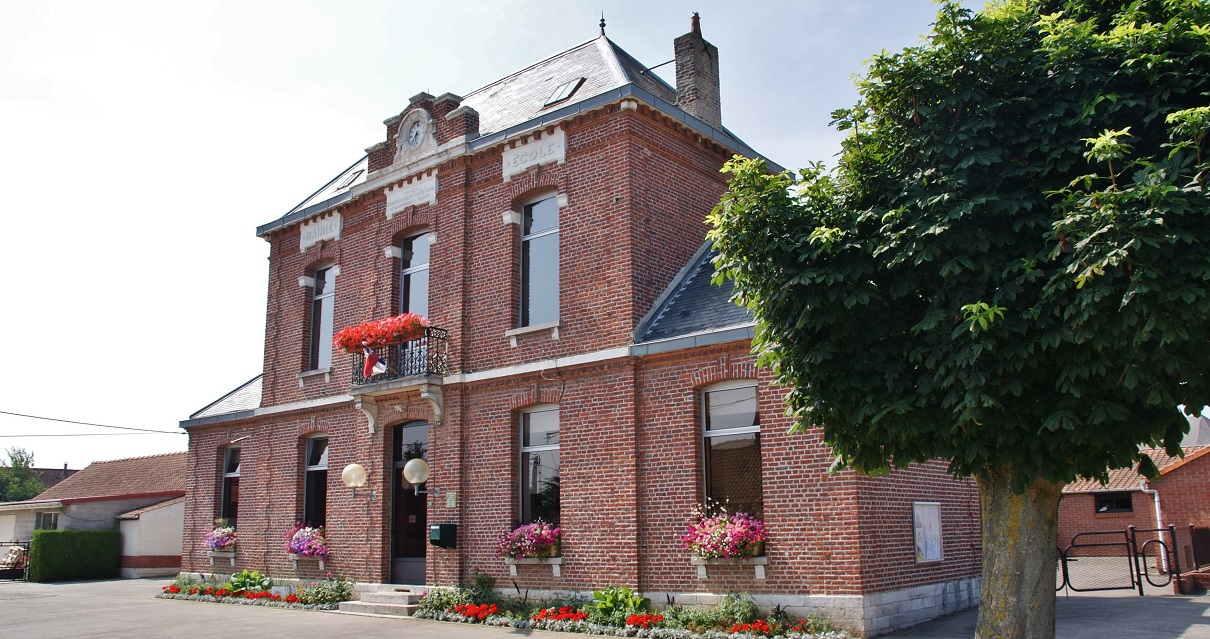
- The town hall of Tilques

- Coat of arms
- Location of Tilques
- Location within France Location within Hauts-de-France
- Coordinates: 50°46′41″N 2°12′18″E
- Country: France
- Region: Hauts-de-France
- Department: Pas-de-Calais
- Arrondissement: Saint-Omer
- Canton: Saint-Omer
- Intercommunality: Pays de Saint-Omer

Government
  - Mayor (2020–2026): Patrick Bedague
- Area^{1}: 7.29 km^{2} (2.81 sq mi)
- Elevation: 27 m (89 ft)
- Highest elevation: 72 m (236 ft)
- Lowest elevation: 1 m (3.3 ft)
- Population (2023): 1,072
  - Density: 147/km^{2} (381/sq mi)
- Time zone: UTC+01:00 (CET)
  - Summer (DST): UTC+02:00 (CEST)
- INSEE/Postal code: 62819 /62500
- ^{1} French Land Register data, which excludes lakes, ponds, glaciers > 1 km^{2} (0.386 sq mi or 247 acres) and river estuaries.

Tilques (French pronunciation: [tilk]; West Flemish: Tileke) is a commune in the Pas-de-Calais department, Hauts-de-France region in northern France. The placename derives from medieval Flemish: Tilleke.

== Geography ==
Tilques is located 4 miles (6 km) north of Saint-Omer, at the D214 and D943 road junction.

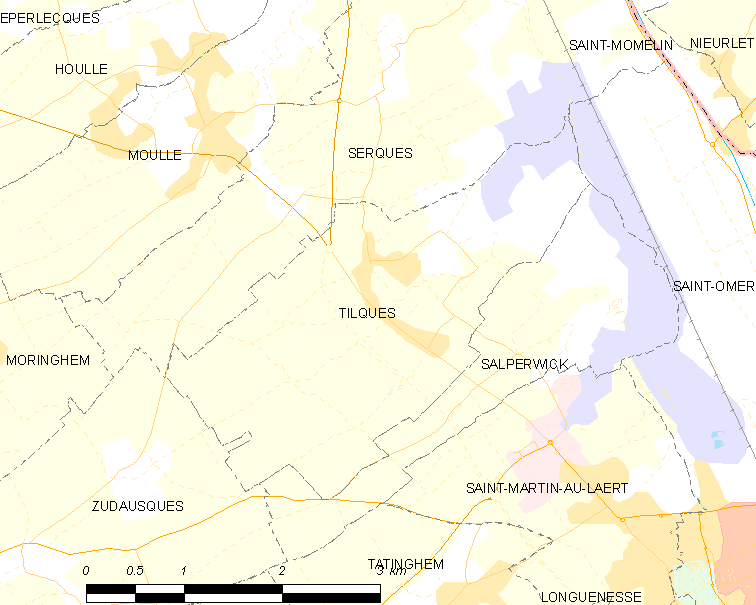
Map of the commune and adjacent places

== Population ==
Historical population
Year	Pop.	±% p.a.
1968	751	—
1975	696	−1.08%
1982	776	+1.57%
1990	900	+1.87%
1999	947	+0.57%
2007	1,052	+1.32%
2012	1,109	+1.06%
2017	1,099	−0.18%
2023	1,072	−0.41%
Source: INSEE

== Places of interest ==
- The thirteenth-century château d'Ecou at Tilques, which was rebuilt in the 15th century
- The church of the Sacred Heart. Its nave was rebuilt in the nineteenth century by Charles Leroy, the architect of the Basilica of Notre Dame de la Treille in Lille.

The castle dates from the thirteenth century, it was remodeled in the fifteenth century. In 1595 it belonged to Adrian Cross Lord of Wasquehal. The mid-eighteenth century, it belonged to Andre de Martigny, then Guislain of Herbais and Family Taffin Tilques who kept two centuries.

== See also ==
- Communes of the Pas-de-Calais department
