= Nort-Leulinghem =

Nort-Leulinghem Noordleulingem
- Commune
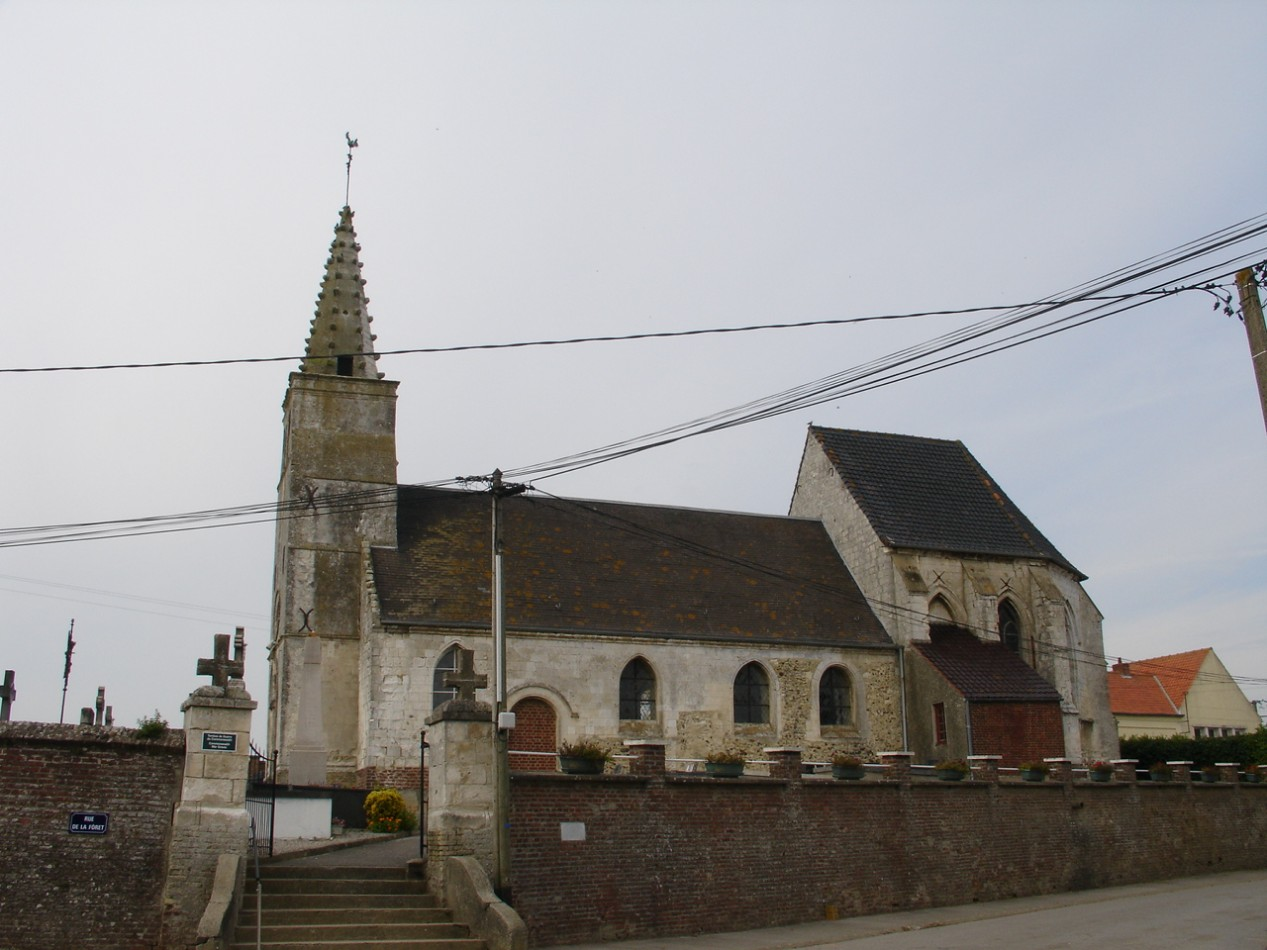
- The church of Nort-Leulinghem

- Coat of arms
- Location of Nort-Leulinghem
- Location within France Location within Hauts-de-France
- Coordinates: 50°48′02″N 2°05′37″E
- Country: France
- Region: Hauts-de-France
- Department: Pas-de-Calais
- Arrondissement: Saint-Omer
- Canton: Saint-Omer
- Intercommunality: Pays de Saint-Omer

Government
  - Mayor (2020–2026): Jean-Marie Brame
- Area^{1}: 3.45 km^{2} (1.33 sq mi)
- Elevation: 50 m (160 ft)
- Highest elevation: 116 m (381 ft)
- Lowest elevation: 41 m (135 ft)
- Population (2023): 261
  - Density: 75.7/km^{2} (196/sq mi)
- Time zone: UTC+01:00 (CET)
  - Summer (DST): UTC+02:00 (CEST)
- INSEE/Postal code: 62622 /62890
- ^{1} French Land Register data, which excludes lakes, ponds, glaciers > 1 km^{2} (0.386 sq mi or 247 acres) and river estuaries.

Nort-Leulinghem (West Flemish: Noordleulingem) is a commune in the Pas-de-Calais department in the Hauts-de-France region of France.

== Geography ==
Nort-Leulinghem is locates about 9 miles (14 km) northwest of Saint-Omer, at the junction of the D191 and the D221 roads, half a mile from the A26 autoroute.

== Population ==
Historical population
Year	Pop.	±% p.a.
1968	122	—
1975	109	−1.60%
1982	156	+5.25%
1990	171	+1.15%
1999	177	+0.38%
2007	200	+1.54%
2012	200	+0.00%
2017	234	+3.19%
2023	261	+1.84%
Source: INSEE

== Places of interest ==
- The church of St. André, dating from the sixteenth century.

== See also ==
- Communes of the Pas-de-Calais department
