= Longuenesse =

Longuenesse Langenesse
- Commune
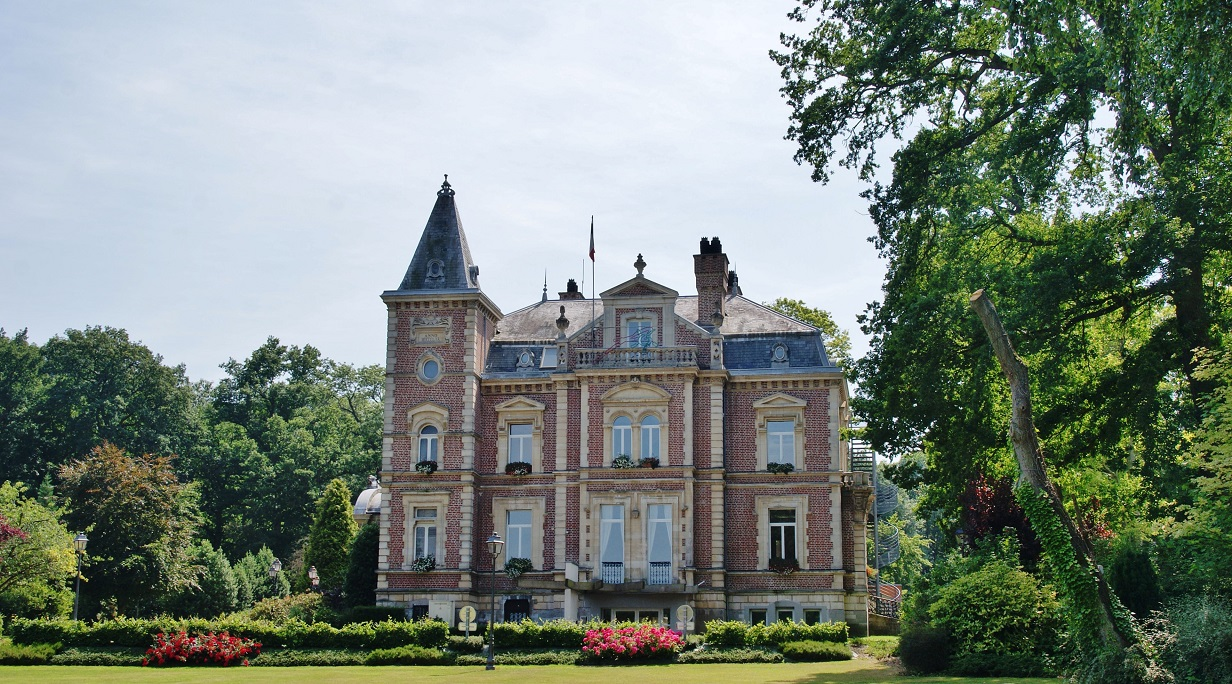
- The town hall of Longuenesse

- Coat of arms
- Location of Longuenesse
- Location within France Location within Hauts-de-France
- Coordinates: 50°44′11″N 2°14′18″E
- Country: France
- Region: Hauts-de-France
- Department: Pas-de-Calais
- Arrondissement: Saint-Omer
- Canton: Longuenesse
- Intercommunality: Pays de Saint-Omer

Government
  - Mayor (2020–2026): Christian Coupez
- Area^{1}: 8.4 km^{2} (3.2 sq mi)
- Elevation: 75 m (246 ft)
- Highest elevation: 79 m (259 ft)
- Lowest elevation: 3 m (9.8 ft)
- Population (2023): 10,548
  - Density: 1,300/km^{2} (3,300/sq mi)
- Time zone: UTC+01:00 (CET)
  - Summer (DST): UTC+02:00 (CEST)
- INSEE/Postal code: 62525 /62219
- ^{1} French Land Register data, which excludes lakes, ponds, glaciers > 1 km^{2} (0.386 sq mi or 247 acres) and river estuaries.

Longuenesse (French pronunciation: [lɔ̃ɡnɛs]; West Flemish: Langenesse) is a commune in the Pas-de-Calais department in the Hauts-de-France region of France. It is a suburb of Saint-Omer, one mile southwest of the centre.

== Population ==
Historical population
Year	Pop.	±% p.a.
1968	4,794	—
1975	9,397	+10.09%
1982	11,970	+3.52%
1990	12,604	+0.65%
1999	12,518	−0.08%
2007	11,120	−1.47%
2012	11,108	−0.02%
2017	11,023	−0.15%
2023	10,548	−0.73%
Source: INSEE

== Twin towns ==
- Vedrin, in Belgium

== See also ==
- Audomarois
- Communes of the Pas-de-Calais department
