= Mentque-Nortbécourt =

Mentque-Nortbécourt Menteke-Noordboekhout
- Commune
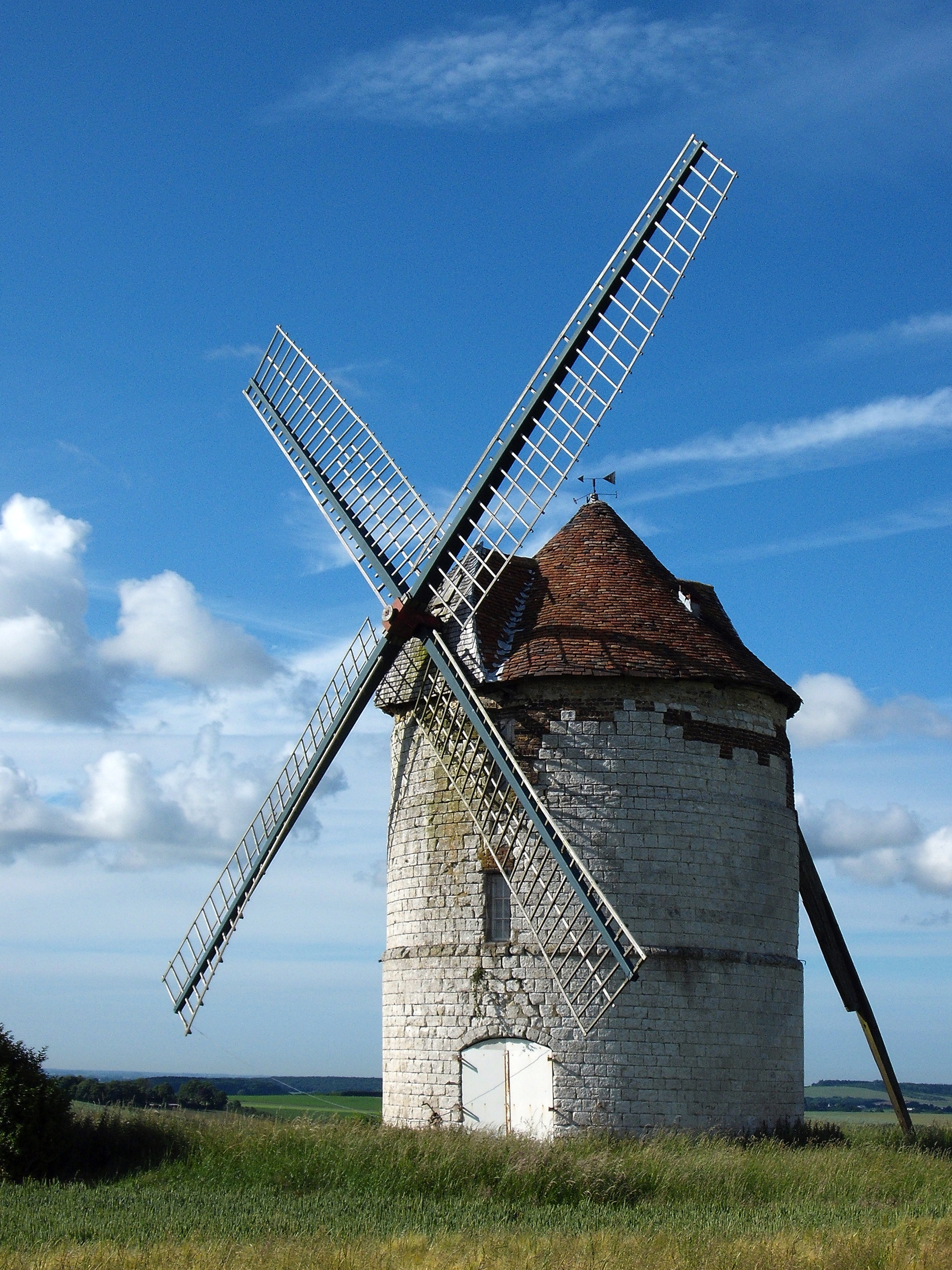
- Eighteenth-century windmill

- Coat of arms
- Location of Mentque-Nortbécourt
- Location within France Location within Hauts-de-France
- Coordinates: 50°47′01″N 2°05′06″E
- Country: France
- Region: Hauts-de-France
- Department: Pas-de-Calais
- Arrondissement: Saint-Omer
- Canton: Saint-Omer
- Intercommunality: Pays de Saint-Omer

Government
  - Mayor (2020–2026): Christian Terninck
- Area^{1}: 10.78 km^{2} (4.16 sq mi)
- Elevation: 85 m (279 ft)
- Highest elevation: 163 m (535 ft)
- Lowest elevation: 53 m (174 ft)
- Population (2023): 649
  - Density: 60.2/km^{2} (156/sq mi)
- Time zone: UTC+01:00 (CET)
  - Summer (DST): UTC+02:00 (CEST)
- INSEE/Postal code: 62567 /62890
- ^{1} French Land Register data, which excludes lakes, ponds, glaciers > 1 km^{2} (0.386 sq mi or 247 acres) and river estuaries.

Mentque-Nortbécourt (French pronunciation: [mɑ̃k nɔʁbekuʁ]; West Flemish: Menteke-Noordboekhout) is a commune in the Pas-de-Calais department in the Hauts-de-France region of France.

== Geography ==
Mentque-Nortbécourt lies about 8 miles (13 km) northwest of Saint-Omer, at the junction of the D221 and D220 roads. The two villages were joined as one commune in 1819.

== Population ==
Historical population
Year	Pop.	±% p.a.
1968	450	—
1975	404	−1.53%
1982	426	+0.76%
1990	446	+0.58%
1999	449	+0.07%
2007	544	+2.43%
2012	619	+2.62%
2017	651	+1.01%
2023	649	−0.05%
Source: INSEE

== Places of interest ==
- The Nortbécourt or Lebriez windmill was built on limestone rubble foundations in 1714, according to an inscription on a stone inside the tower. In 1897, it became the property of Alphonse Lebriez, who was the miller until the cessation of activity in 1950. In 1964, Michel Hoyez bought the mill and saved it from ruin. It has been included in the inventory of Historic Monuments since 1977. The sails were rebuilt in December 1981 but remain fixed and cannot rotate. One of them was hit by lightning.

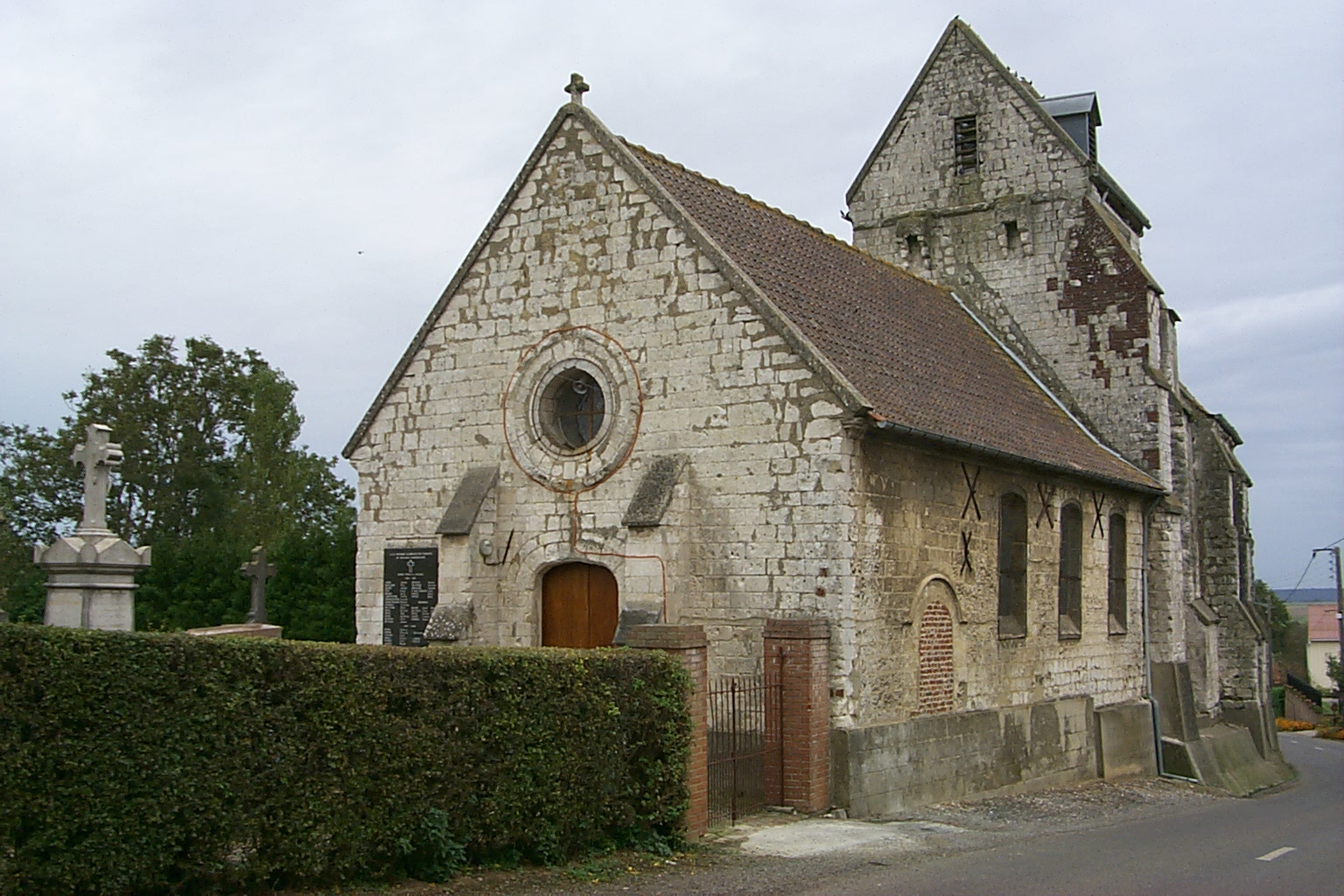
Mentque church

- The church of St. Wandrille at Nortbécourt, dating from the twelfth century.
- The Château of Inglinghen.
- The church of St.Leger at Mentque, dating from the thirteenth century.
- The remains of a feudal motte of 25m diameter.

== See also ==
- Communes of the Pas-de-Calais department
