= Houlle =

Houlle Holne
- Commune
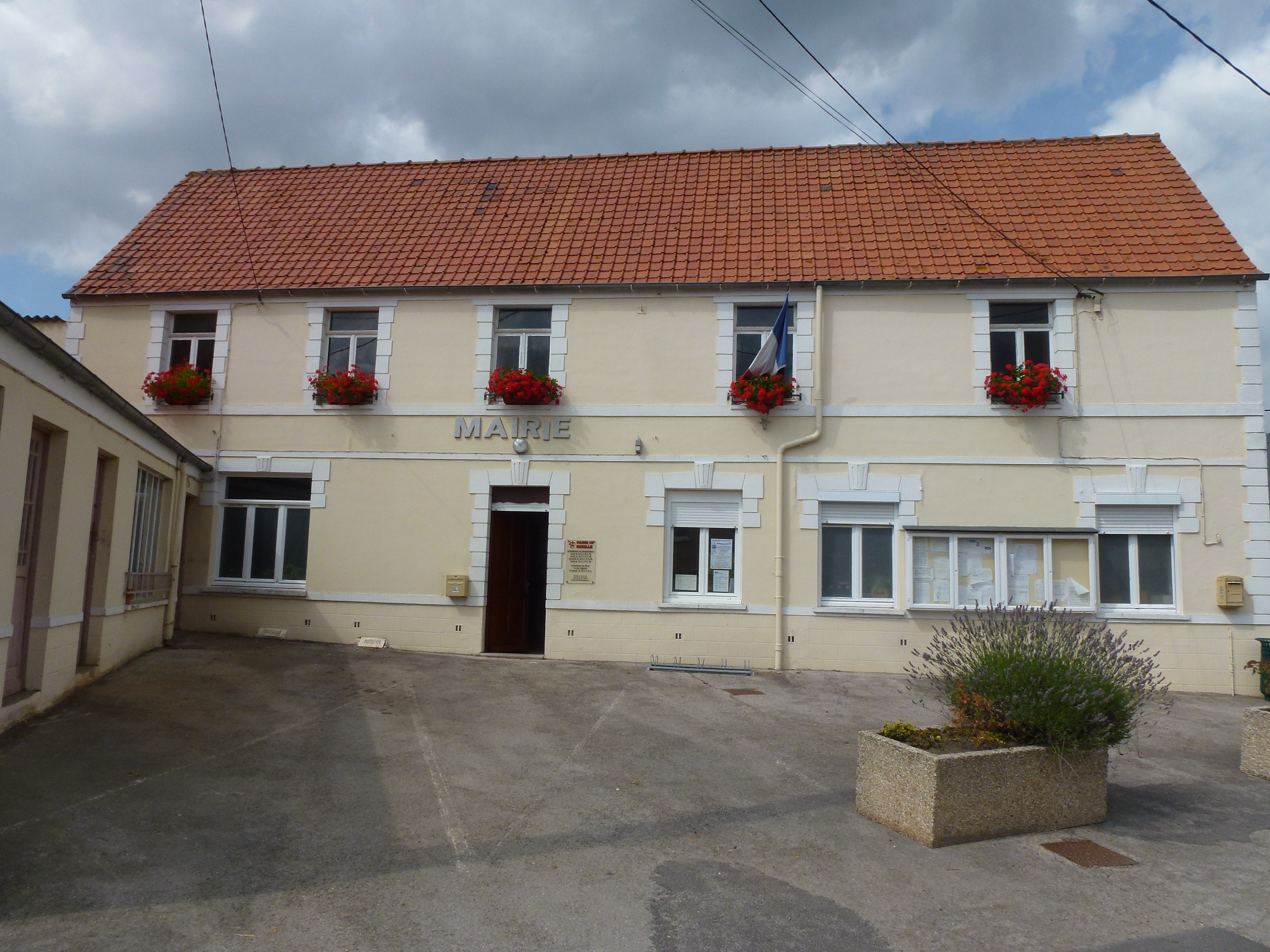
- The town hall of Houlle

- Coat of arms
- Location of Houlle
- Location within France Location within Hauts-de-France
- Coordinates: 50°47′48″N 2°10′25″E
- Country: France
- Region: Hauts-de-France
- Department: Pas-de-Calais
- Arrondissement: Saint-Omer
- Canton: Saint-Omer
- Intercommunality: Pays de Saint-Omer

Government
  - Mayor (2020–2026): Hervé Berteloot
- Area^{1}: 6.52 km^{2} (2.52 sq mi)
- Elevation: 7 m (23 ft)
- Highest elevation: 96 m (315 ft)
- Lowest elevation: 0 m (0 ft)
- Population (2023): 1,116
  - Density: 171/km^{2} (443/sq mi)
- Time zone: UTC+01:00 (CET)
  - Summer (DST): UTC+02:00 (CEST)
- INSEE/Postal code: 62458 /62910
- ^{1} French Land Register data, which excludes lakes, ponds, glaciers > 1 km^{2} (0.386 sq mi or 247 acres) and river estuaries.

Houlle (French pronunciation: [ul]; West Flemish: Holne) is a commune in the Pas-de-Calais department in the Hauts-de-France region of France.

== Geography ==
A village situated 5 miles (8 km) northwest of Saint-Omer, on the D207 road. "Houlle" is also the name of a small river close to the village, tributary of the Aa, included in the water management plan (fr:SAGE) of the Audomarois region.

== Economy ==
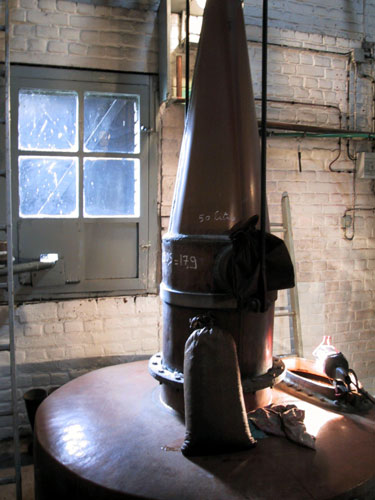
A gin alembic

Spirits from grain, flavoured with berries of the juniper tree, are distilled in Houlle, the Genièvre (juniper) of Houlle; this spirit is very close to the Dutch jenever and more distantly related to dry gin. This is drunk with the local speciality, (potjevleesch) and is used to refine Maroilles cheese.

== Population ==
Historical population
Year	Pop.	±% p.a.
1968	657	—
1975	575	−1.89%
1982	650	+1.77%
1990	864	+3.62%
1999	917	+0.66%
2007	955	+0.51%
2012	1,052	+1.95%
2017	1,127	+1.39%
2023	1,116	−0.16%
Source: INSEE

== Places of interest ==
- The church of St. John the Baptiste, dating from the twelfth century.
- Some 18th-century wells.

== See also ==
- Audomarois
- Communes of the Pas-de-Calais department
