= Moringhem =

Moringhem Moringem
- Commune
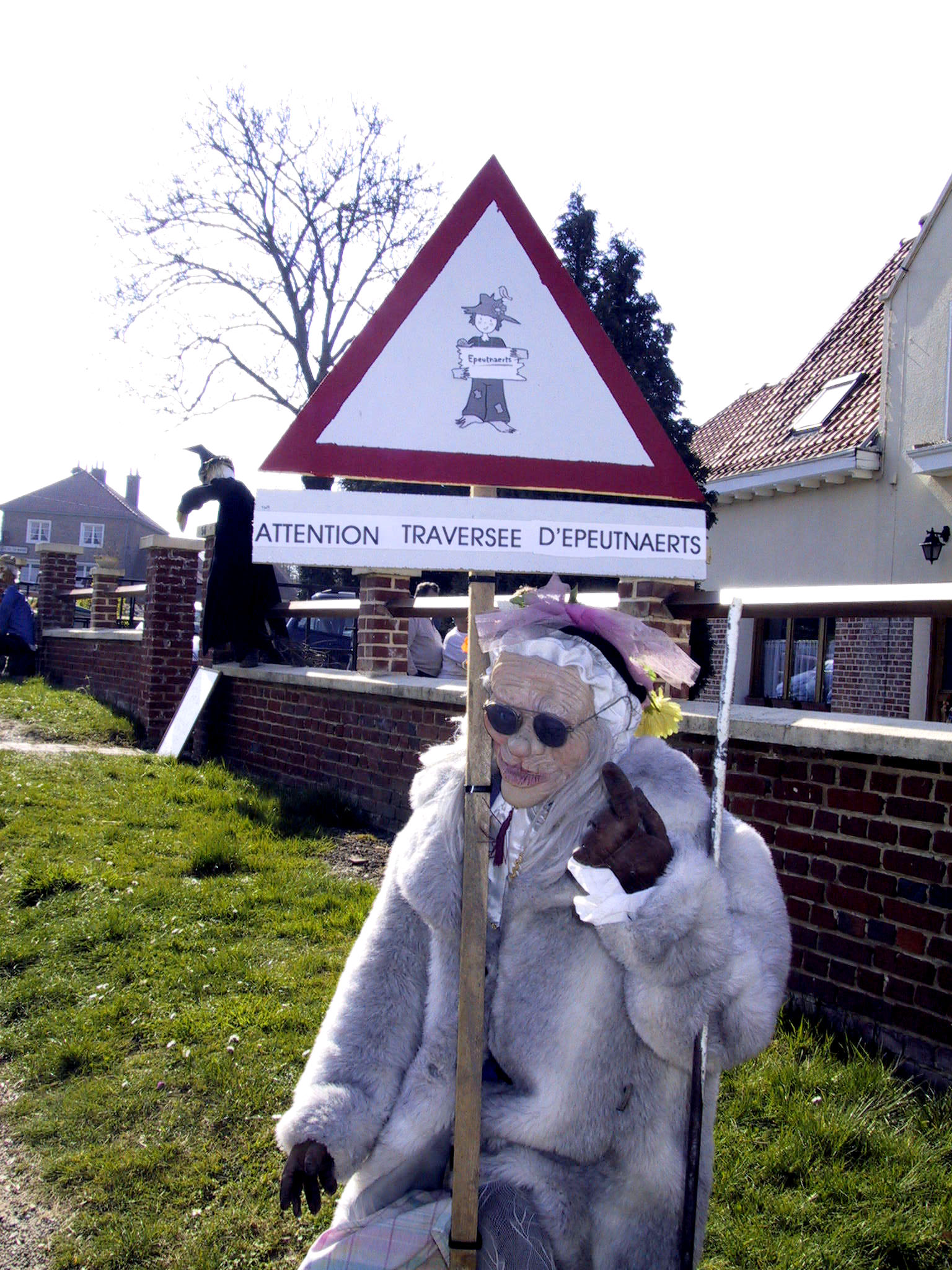
- Scarecrow Festival

- Coat of arms
- Location of Moringhem
- Location within France Location within Hauts-de-France
- Coordinates: 50°45′50″N 2°07′42″E
- Country: France
- Region: Hauts-de-France
- Department: Pas-de-Calais
- Arrondissement: Saint-Omer
- Canton: Saint-Omer
- Intercommunality: Pays de Saint-Omer

Government
  - Mayor (2020–2026): Christophe Cornette
- Area^{1}: 9.98 km^{2} (3.85 sq mi)
- Elevation: 93 m (305 ft)
- Highest elevation: 166 m (545 ft)
- Lowest elevation: 37 m (121 ft)
- Population (2023): 557
  - Density: 55.8/km^{2} (145/sq mi)
- Time zone: UTC+01:00 (CET)
  - Summer (DST): UTC+02:00 (CEST)
- INSEE/Postal code: 62592 /62910
- ^{1} French Land Register data, which excludes lakes, ponds, glaciers > 1 km^{2} (0.386 sq mi or 247 acres) and river estuaries.

Moringhem (French pronunciation: [mɔʁɛ̃ɡɛm]) is a commune in the Pas-de-Calais department in the Hauts-de-France region of France.

== Geography ==
Moringhem lies about 5 miles (8 km) west of Saint-Omer, at the D207 and D223 crossroads. The A26 autoroute passes by about a half mile to the west.

== Population ==
Historical population
Year	Pop.	±% p.a.
1968	360	—
1975	368	+0.31%
1982	363	−0.20%
1990	361	−0.07%
1999	383	+0.66%
2007	464	+2.43%
2012	520	+2.31%
2017	558	+1.42%
2023	557	−0.03%
Source: INSEE

== Places of interest ==
- The stone tower of an 18th-century windmill.
- The church of St. Andre, dating from the eighteenth century.
- The church of St.Maxime at Difques, dating from the fifteenth century.
- The chapel of Barbinghein, built in 1714.

== See also ==
- Communes of the Pas-de-Calais department
