= Serques =

Serques Zegerke
- Commune
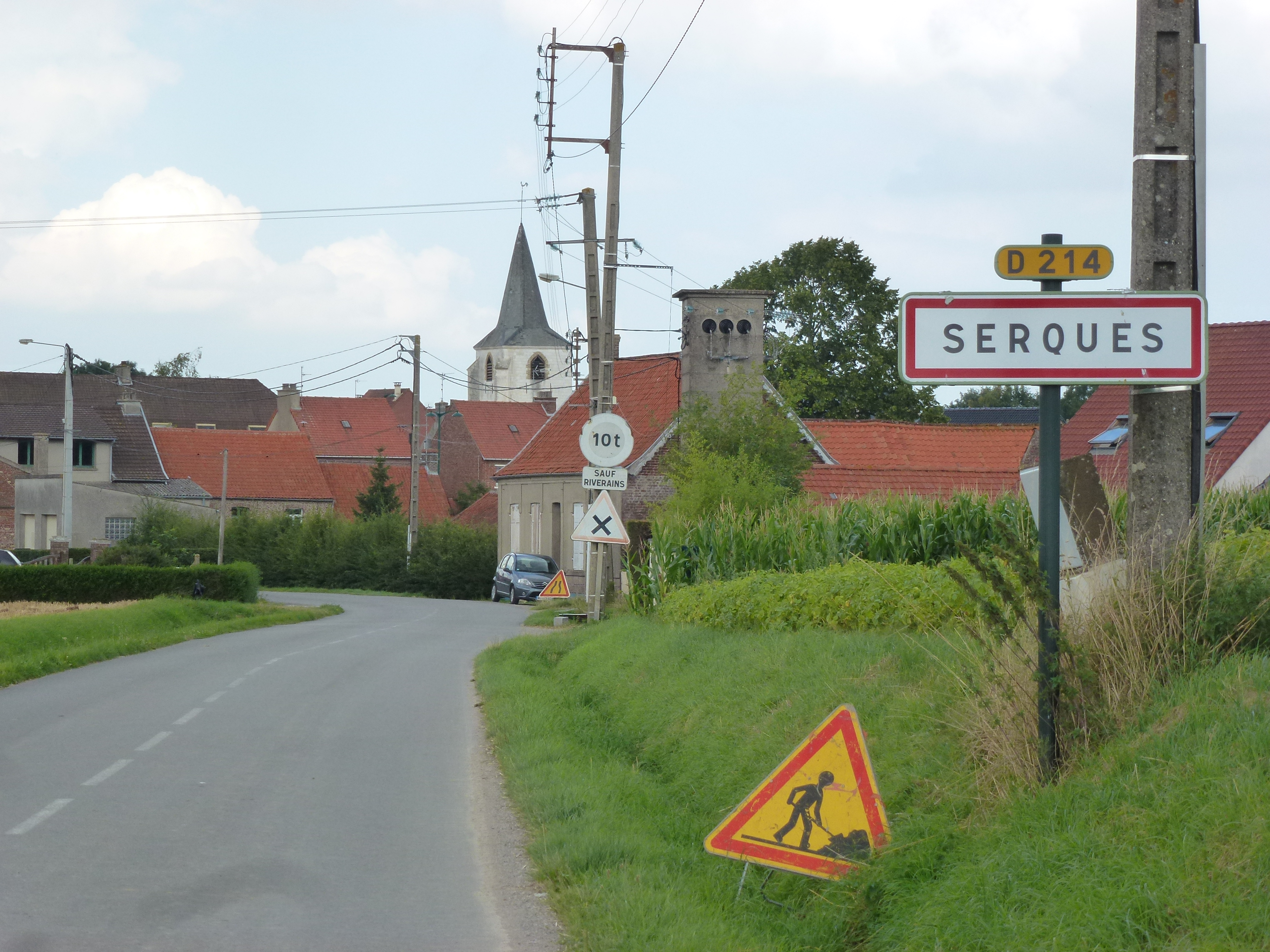
- The road into Serques

- Coat of arms
- Location of Serques
- Location within France Location within Hauts-de-France
- Coordinates: 50°47′39″N 2°12′06″E
- Country: France
- Region: Hauts-de-France
- Department: Pas-de-Calais
- Arrondissement: Saint-Omer
- Canton: Saint-Omer
- Intercommunality: Pays de Saint-Omer

Government
  - Mayor (2022–2026): Etienne Cazin
- Area^{1}: 10.43 km^{2} (4.03 sq mi)
- Elevation: 7 m (23 ft)
- Highest elevation: 72 m (236 ft)
- Lowest elevation: 0 m (0 ft)
- Population (2023): 1,210
  - Density: 116/km^{2} (300/sq mi)
- Time zone: UTC+01:00 (CET)
  - Summer (DST): UTC+02:00 (CEST)
- INSEE/Postal code: 62792 /62910
- ^{1} French Land Register data, which excludes lakes, ponds, glaciers > 1 km^{2} (0.386 sq mi or 247 acres) and river estuaries.

Serques (French pronunciation: [sɛʁk]; West Flemish: Zegerke) is a commune in the Pas-de-Calais department in the Hauts-de-France region of France 5 miles (8.0 km) north of Saint-Omer.

== Population ==
Historical population
Year	Pop.	±% p.a.
1968	755	—
1975	735	−0.38%
1982	707	−0.55%
1990	893	+2.96%
1999	1,034	+1.64%
2007	1,104	+0.82%
2012	1,130	+0.47%
2017	1,148	+0.32%
2023	1,210	+0.88%
Source: INSEE

== See also ==
- Communes of the Pas-de-Calais department
