= Saint-Martin-au-Laërt =

Saint-Martin-au-Laërt Sint-Maartens-Aard
- Part of Saint-Martin-lez-Tatinghem
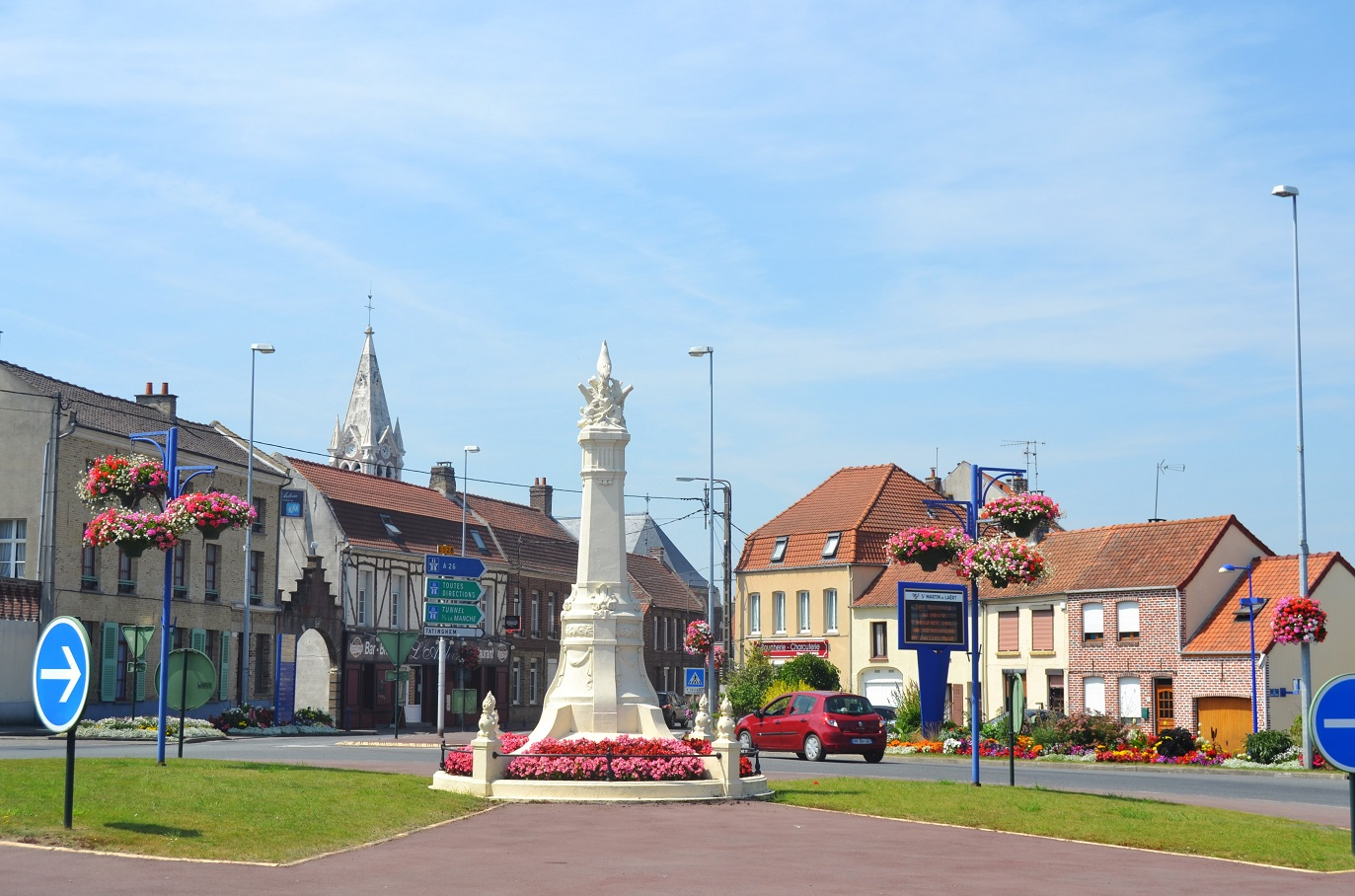
- Monument in the town centre

- Coat of arms
- Location of Saint-Martin-au-Laërt
- Location within France Location within Hauts-de-France
- Coordinates: 50°45′21″N 2°14′12″E
- Country: France
- Region: Hauts-de-France
- Department: Pas-de-Calais
- Arrondissement: Saint-Omer
- Canton: Saint-Omer
- Commune: Saint-Martin-lez-Tatinghem
- Area^{1}: 4.94 km^{2} (1.91 sq mi)
- Elevation: 11 m (36 ft)
- Highest elevation: 46 m (151 ft)
- Lowest elevation: 1 m (3.3 ft)
- Population (2018): 4,077
  - Density: 825/km^{2} (2,140/sq mi)
- Time zone: UTC+01:00 (CET)
  - Summer (DST): UTC+02:00 (CEST)
- Postal code: 62500
- ^{1} French Land Register data, which excludes lakes, ponds, glaciers > 1 km^{2} (0.386 sq mi or 247 acres) and river estuaries.

Saint-Martin-au-Laërt (French pronunciation: [sɛ̃ maʁtɛ̃ o laʁ]; West Flemish: Sint-Maartens-Aard) is a former commune in the Pas-de-Calais department in northern France. On 1 January 2016, it was merged into the new commune Saint-Martin-lez-Tatinghem.

== Geography ==
Saint-Martin-au-Laërt is a farming and light industrial suburb to the northwest of Saint-Omer on the D928 and D923 roads.

== Population ==
The inhabitants are called Saint-Martinois in French.

Historical population
Year	Pop.	±% p.a.
1962	1,630	—
1968	2,764	+9.20%
1975	4,857	+8.39%
1982	4,398	−1.41%
1990	4,259	−0.40%
1999	3,921	−0.91%
2006	3,882	−0.14%
2018	4,077	+0.41%
Source: EHESS and INSEE

== Places of interest ==
- The church of St.Martin, dating from the fifteenth century.
- The windmill tower, classified as an ancient monument.
- The Château de La Tour Blanche.

== Administration ==
Mayors
Period	Name	Party
1808	Deslyon de Moncheaux	
1824	Valery Lemaire	
1826	Comte du Tertre Charles Henri	
1831	Henri Bocquet	
1832	Etienne Pouly	
1835	Augustin Campagne	
1853	Xavier Mahieu	
1865	Augustin Campagne	
1871	Charles Mahieu	
1874	Walleux Duquenoy	
1887	André Campagne	
1904	Gaston Pouly	
1908	André Campagne	
1913	Eugène Marquis	
1919	René Cotillon	
1944	Victor Denis	
1947	Fernand Marquis	
1959	Henri Stoven	
1969	Victor Guilbert	
1981	Raymond Lamare	
2001	Bertrand Petit	

== See also ==
- Audomarois
- Communes of the Pas-de-Calais department
