= Clairmarais =

Clairmarais Klaarmares
- Commune
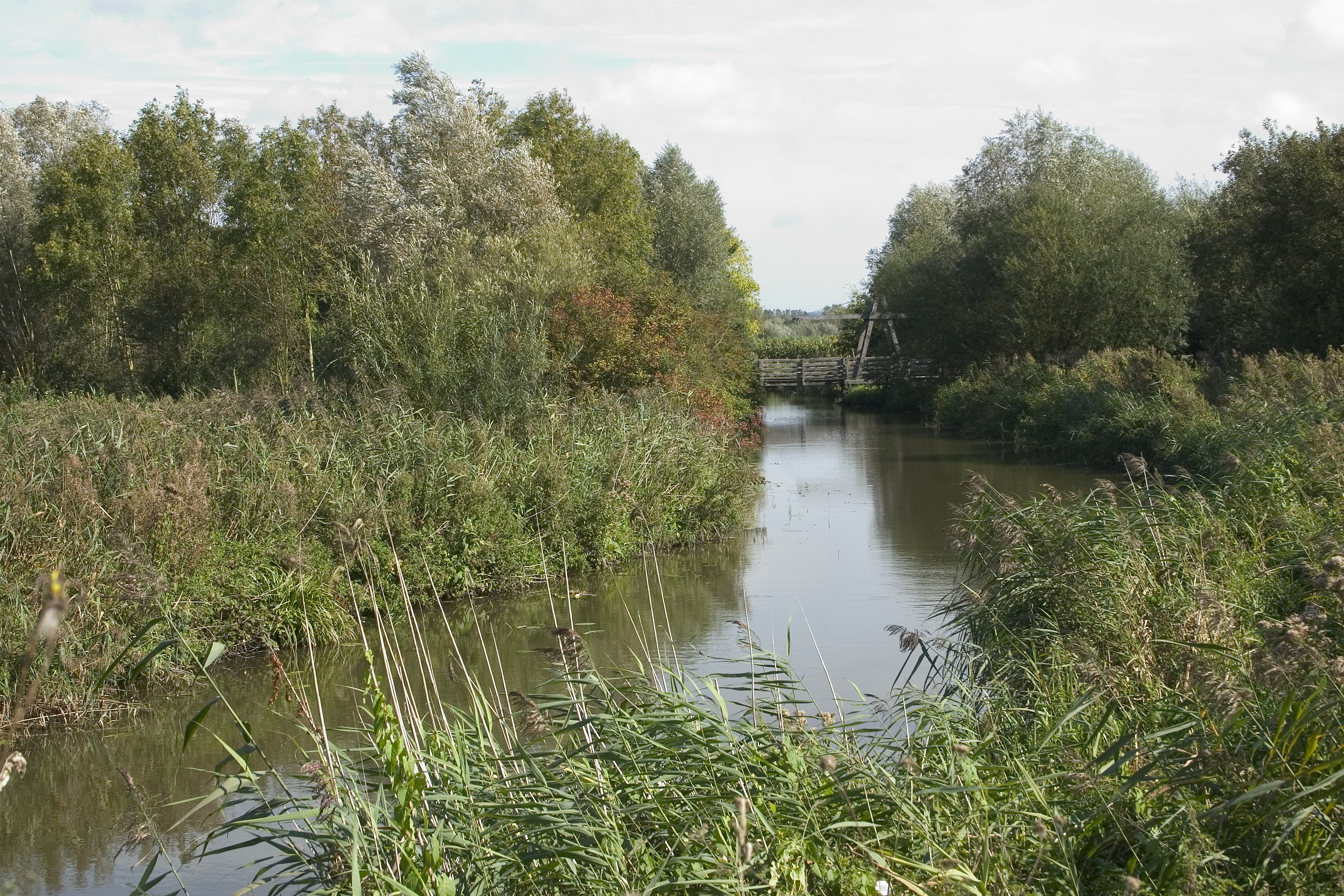
- Romelaëre nature reserve

- Coat of arms
- Location of Clairmarais
- Location within France Location within Hauts-de-France
- Coordinates: 50°46′27″N 2°18′03″E
- Country: France
- Region: Hauts-de-France
- Department: Pas-de-Calais
- Arrondissement: Saint-Omer
- Canton: Saint-Omer
- Intercommunality: Pays de Saint-Omer

Government
  - Mayor (2020–2026): Damien Morel
- Area^{1}: 18.02 km^{2} (6.96 sq mi)
- Elevation: 9 m (30 ft)
- Highest elevation: 34 m (112 ft)
- Lowest elevation: 1 m (3.3 ft)
- Population (2023): 593
  - Density: 32.9/km^{2} (85.2/sq mi)
- Time zone: UTC+01:00 (CET)
  - Summer (DST): UTC+02:00 (CEST)
- INSEE/Postal code: 62225 /62500
- ^{1} French Land Register data, which excludes lakes, ponds, glaciers > 1 km^{2} (0.386 sq mi or 247 acres) and river estuaries.

Clairmarais (French pronunciation: [klɛʁmaʁɛ]; West Flemish: Klaarmares) is a commune in the Pas-de-Calais department in the Hauts-de-France region of France. 2 miles (3 km) northeast of Saint-Omer. The Neufosse Canal, which connects the rivers Aa and Lys, passes by the commune. During World War I, the Royal Flying Corps, and later Royal Air Force, operated from Clairmarais aerodrome.

== Population ==
Historical population
Year	Pop.	±% p.a.
1968	410	—
1975	480	+2.28%
1982	598	+3.19%
1990	687	+1.75%
1999	689	+0.03%
2007	648	−0.76%
2012	627	−0.66%
2017	624	−0.10%
2023	593	−0.85%
Source: INSEE

== Places of interest ==
- The Romelaëre national nature reserve.

== See also ==
- Communes of the Pas-de-Calais department
