= Beatrice of Bourbourg =

Châtelaine of Bourbourg and countess of Guînes

- Died: 1224
- Title: Châtelaine of Bourbourg, countess of Guînes
- Spouse: Arnold II of Guînes
- Children: 9

Beatrice of Bourbourg (died 1224) was a châtelaine of Bourbourg and countess of Guînes. She founded an abbey at Bonham.

== Life ==
Beatrice of Bourbourg became a châtelaine of Bourbourg after inheriting the title from her brother Henry II of Bourbourg who died in 1194. She was likely an adolescent at the time of her inheritance. She additionally inherited a claim to the lordship of Aalst, but the claim was largely unenforceable because her family did not control that territory at the time, and there is no historical evidence that she used the title "lady of Aalst".

Beatrice married Arnold II of Guînes, who left his fiancee to become engaged to her after she inherited the title of châtelaine. He was likely motivated by the fact that Bourbourg and Guînes bordered each other, granting the marriage strategic value in light of the tenuous relationships between both counties and the neighboring Boulogne. Arnold gained the title of châtelain of Bourbourg as a result of the marriage, while Beatrice became countess of Guînes.

In the weeks before the Battle of Bouvines, Arnold changed allegiances, supporting the French rather than the Flemish. In 1214, when the Flemish army arrived at Guînes, Robert of Bethune freed Beatrice from the castle after she had been imprisoned by Arnold. It is likely that Beatrice remained loyal to Flanders when her husband changed sides in the conflict, creating a political disagreement between the two. Beatrice took her children and servants with her to Flanders, where she remained in exile for four years to avoid being imprisoned again by her husband. However, the pair eventually reconciled.

Beatrice and Arnold had nine children, including Baldwin III of Guînes and a daughter also named Beatrice. Beatrice's husband Arnold died in 1220, and she died in 1224.

== Historical significance ==
Beatrice of Bourbourg was not especially important in her time, and few contemporary sources discussed her. However, both she and her husband were related to many significant figures in the history of the region.

Lambert of Ardres, who officiated Beatrice's wedding in his role as chaplain of Ardres and baptized her children, wrote about her in History of the Counts of Guines and Lords of Ardres. In the text, he praised her extensively for her beauty and intellect. He additionally described her as a virago, though his use of the term was likely not negative. William of Andres took a more negative view of Beatrice, characterizing her as greedy and stubborn in his writing.
