= Manasses I =

Manasses I may refer to:

- Manasses the Old of Chalon (died 918). count of Chalon and Langres (as Manasses I)
- Manasses I, Count of Rethel (10th century)
- Manasses of Montdidier (died 993), bishop of Troyes (as Manasses I)
- Manasses I of Guînes (11th century), also called Manasses the Old
- Manasses I (archbishop of Reims) (died after 1081)
- Manasses I (bishop of Meaux) (died 1120)

== See also ==
- Manasses II
- Manasses III
