= Siegfried, Count of Guînes =

Siegfried de Guînes (died c. 965) (Latin: Sifridus Dacus), also known as Siegfried "the Dane" (Sifridus de Dachia), Sigifrid, or Sigifroy, is believed to have been a Viking who controlled the area around Guînes in 928, although he never seemed to be formally designated as count even though he is known as such. He would have been the founder of the line of the counts of Guînes. In reality his existence is not proven.

The lands of Guînes originally belonged to the Abbey of Sithiu, which later became the Abbey of Saint-Bertin in Saint-Omer, France. In 877, Charles the Bald had confirmed the abbey's possessions of these lands, which were afterwards obtained by the County of Flanders.

There are two hypotheses regarding how Siegfried came to and took possession of Guînes:

- Count William I of Ponthieu took the Boulonnais, Guînes, and Saint-Pol-sur-Ternoise from Count Arnulf II of Flanders in 965, whereupon Arnulf enlisted the aid of the Danes. They succeeded in regaining the territories for Arnulf, who then gave Guînes to Siegfried as well as his aunt Elftrudis in marriage.
- Siegfried and the Normans or Vikings invaded the area around 928 and started building the city of Guînes. Count Arnulf I of Flanders did not counterattack and recognized Siegfried as a vassal and gave him his daughter Elftrudis in marriage.

There is also a legend that around 965 Siegfried fell in love with Elftrude, daughter of Arnulf I of Flanders, and Elftrude became pregnant. That same year, Siegfried died and Elftrude had a posthumous son, baptised as Ardolf (Ardolph), who became the first count of Guînes.

Although this has been accepted by a number of historians, such as Siegfried Rösch, there are no contemporary records of these events, as the earliest recorded history was written 200 years later. Thus, his existence is obscure. He is mentioned for the first time at the beginning of the 13th century in the chronicle of the counts of Guînes by Lambert of Ardres as the progenitor of the Count's house. Lambert's writings are questionable because he appears to be a chronicler “who makes mistakes, distorts, invents if necessary”.

Lambert puts Siegfried's arrival in Guînes around 928 and puts his death in 965 or 966, shortly after the death of Arnulf I of Flanders.
