= Siege of Guines =

Siege of Guines may refer to:

- Siege of Guines (1352), the unsuccessful siege of the town by the French during the Hundred Years' War
- Siege of Guines (1436), the unsuccessful siege of the town by the French during the Hundred Years' War
- Siege of Guines (1514), the unsuccessful siege of the town by the French during the War of the League of Cambrai
- Siege of Guines (1558), the siege and capture of the town by the French during the conquest of the Pale of Calais
