= Castellan =

Title used in medieval Europe for a governor of a castle

A castellan, or constable, was the governor of a castle in medieval Europe. Its surrounding territory was referred to as the castellany.

== Etymology ==
The word stems from castellanus.

== Initial functions ==
During the Migration Period after the fall of the Western Roman Empire (third to sixth century), foreign tribes entered Western Europe, causing strife. The answer to recurrent invasion was to create fortified areas which evolved into castles. Some military leaders gained control of several areas, each with a castle. The problem lay in exerting control and authority in each area when a leader could only be in one place at a time. To overcome this, they appointed castellans as their trusted vassals to manage a castle in exchange for obligations to the landlord, often a noble. In the 9th century, as fortifications improved and kings had difficulty making their subordinates pay their taxes or send the military aid they demanded, castellans grew in power, holding their fiefdoms without much concern for their overlord's demands. This changed as kings grew in power and as the Holy Roman Emperors replaced recalcitrant vassals with rival ministerial appointments.

== Sex ==
A castellan was almost always male, but could occasionally be female, as when, in 1194, Beatrice of Bourbourg inherited her father's castellany of Bourbourg upon the death of her brother, Roger.

== Duties ==
Usually the duties of a castellan consisted of military responsibility for the castle's garrison, maintaining defences and protecting the castle's lands, combined with the legal administration of local lands and workers including the castle's domestic staff. The responsibility applied even where there was no resident castellan at the castle, or if he was frequently absent. A castellan could exercise the power of the "ban" – that is, to hear court cases and collect fines, taxes from residents, and muster local men for the defence of the area or the realm. There are similarities with a lord of the manor. Castellans had the power to administer all local justice, including sentencing and punishments up to and including the death penalty, as when, in 1111, the Salzburg castellan caught the minister fomenting armed rebellion and had the offender blinded, "as one would a serf". Later the castellan came to serve as the representative of the people of his castellany. So happened in the case of the castellan of Bruges, when the burghers stood up for more privileges and liberties from the counts of Flanders.

=== Castellans and Jews ===
A particular responsibility in western Europe concerned jurisdiction over the resident Jewish communities bordering the English Channel. The Constable of the Tower of London and those castellans subordinate to the dukes of Normandy were responsible for their administration. Vivian Lipman posits four reasons for this: the castles provided defence, they were centres of administration, their dungeons were used as prisons and castellans could turn to the Jewish community to borrow money as usury was forbidden to Catholics.

== Castellany ==
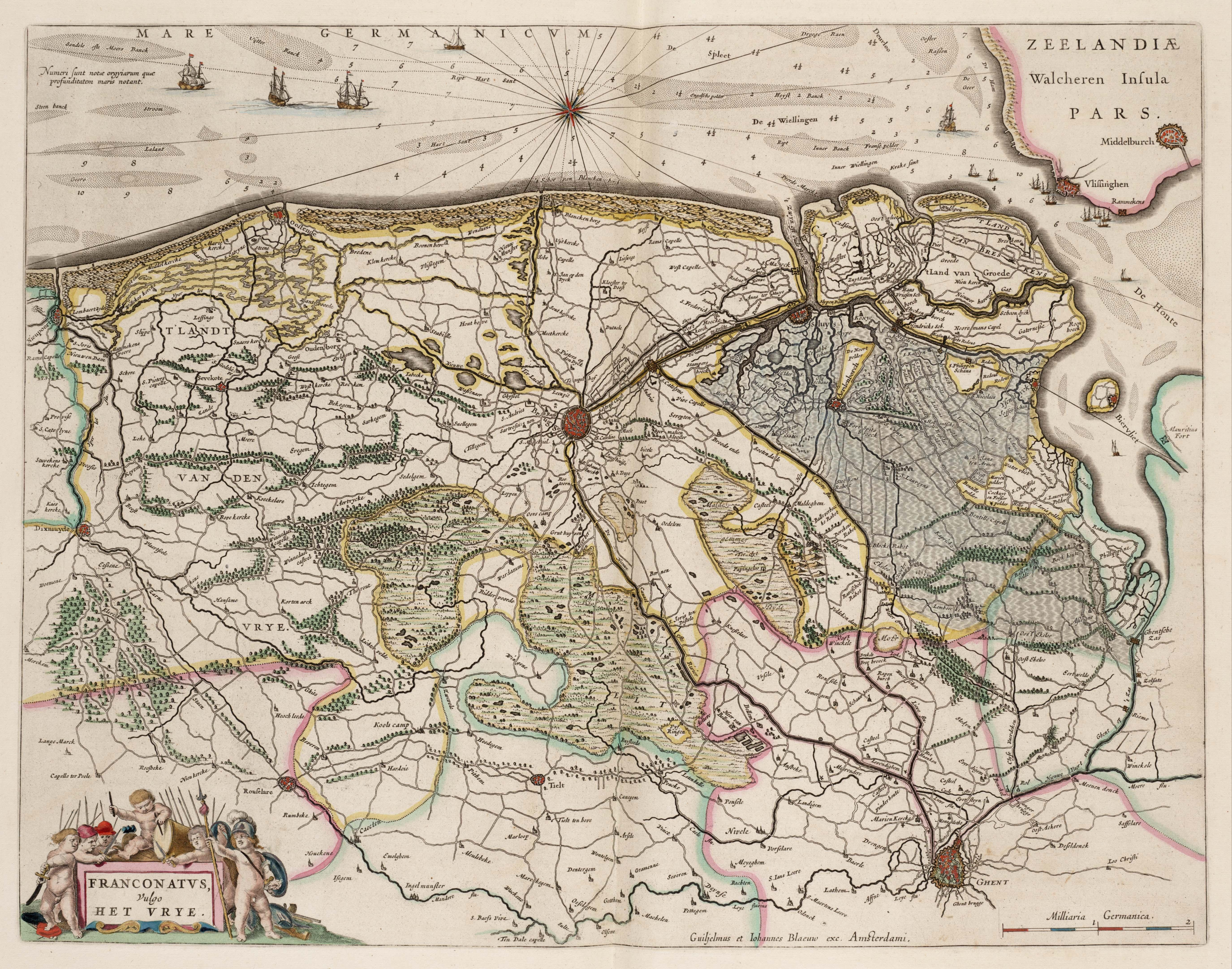
Map of the Brugse Vrije, a castellany of the County of Flanders

A castellany, or castellania, is a term denoting a district administered by a castellan. Castellanies appeared during the Middle Ages and in most current states are now replaced by a more modern type of county subdivision. The word is derived from castle and literally means the extent of land and jurisdiction attached to a given castle.

There are equivalent, often cognate, terms in other languages. Examples of French châtelainies include the castellanies of Ivry-la-Bataille, Nonancourt, Pacy-sur-Eure, Vernon and Gaillon, all in Normandy, which under in the treaty of Issoudun of 1195, after a war with King Richard I of England, were acquired for the French crown by Philip Augustus.

Examples of castellanies in Poland include: Łęczyca and Sieradz (both duchies at one time), Spycimierz, Rozprza, Wolbórz now in the Lodz Voivodeship, and Wojnicz now in the Lesser Poland Voivodeship or Otmuchów in Silesia.

== National differences ==
=== France ===
In France, castellans (known in French as châtelains) who governed castellanies without a resident count, acquired considerable powers such that the position became hereditary. By the tenth century, the fragmentation of power had become so widespread that in Mâcon, for instance, where the castellany was the basic unit of governance, there was no effective administrative level above it, so that the counts of Mâcon were largely ignored by their subordinate castellans from about 980 to 1030. In the 12th century, châtelains had become "lords" in their own right and were able to expand their territories to include weaker castellanies. Thus the castellan of Beaujeu was able to take over lands in Lyon, or the castellan of Uxelles annexed first Briançon, then Sennecey-le-Grand and finally l'Épervière.

In other areas, castellans did not manage to rise to noble status and remained the local officer of a noble. During the Ancien Régime, castellans were heads of local royal administration, and their power was further delegated to their lieutenants.

All remaining lordships and local royal administrators were suppressed during the French Revolution. During the 19th and 20th centuries, châtelain was used to describe the owner of a castle or manor house, in many cases a figure of authority in his parish, akin to the English squire.

=== German lands ===
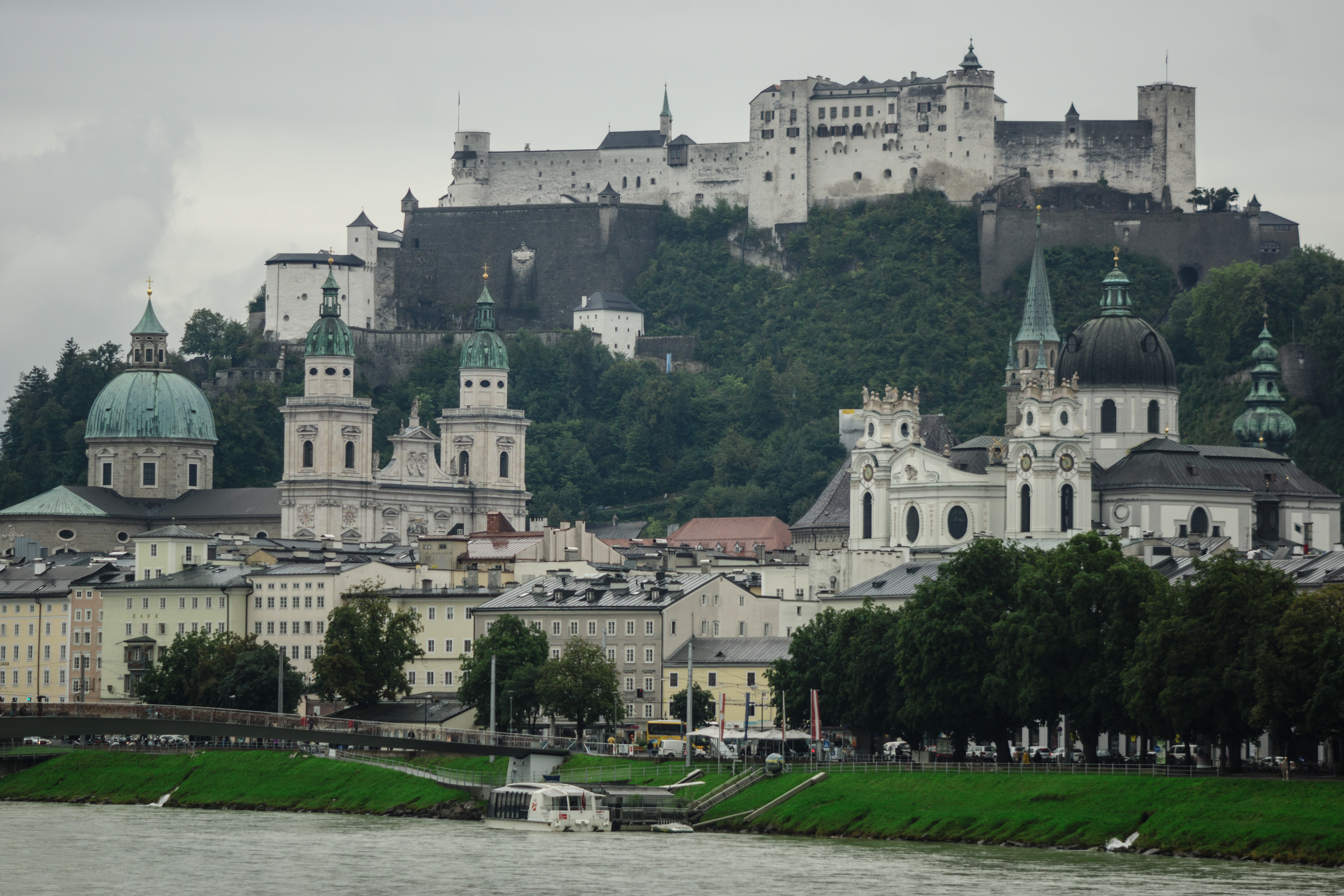
The fortress of Hohensalzburg, Austria, had a ministerial castellan

In Germany the castellan was known as a Burgmann, or sometimes Hauptmann ("captain"), who reported to the lord of the castle, or Burgherr, also often known as the burgrave (Burggraf). The burgmann may have been either a free noble or a ministerialis, but either way, he administered the castle as a vassal. A ministerialis was wholly subordinate to a lord and was under his control. Ministeriales replaced free nobles as castellans of Hohensalzburg under Conrad I of Abensberg’s tenure as Archbishop of Salzburg from 1106 to 1147, beginning with Henry of Seekirchen in the 1130s.

=== Hungary ===
In the Medieval Kingdom of Hungary the castellan was called "várnagy", and in the Latin chronicles he appeared as "castellanus". The lord of the castle had very similar functions to those in German lands. In Hungary the King initially designated castellans from among his court for the administration of castles and estates. Later designation of castellans devolved to the most powerful noblemen.

=== Jerusalem ===
At one time there was a castellan nominated from among the Officers of the Kingdom of Jerusalem. Anselm was the first such castellan, c. 1110.

=== Malta ===
A castellan was established in Valletta on the island of Malta.

=== Poland ===
In the Kingdom of Poland and later the Polish–Lithuanian Commonwealth, castellans (Polish: Kasztelan) were territorial and senatorial officials responsible for castle districts and regional administration. Though generally ranking beneath voivodes in the hierarchy of provincial authority (with the exception of the Burgrave of Kraków (Polish Burgrabia krakowski) who had precedence over the Voivode of Kraków), castellans remained important noble dignitaries and members of the Senate of Poland. Castellans were in charge of a subdivision of a voivodeship called the castellany (Polish Kasztelania) until the 15th-century. From then on castellanies, depending on their size, either became provinces, or in the case of smaller domains were replaced by powiats and the castellan role became honorific and was replaced in situ by a Starosta. Castellans in the medieval Kingdom of Poland were originally appointed from among both the nobility and the broader class of royal military-administrative elites. By the later medieval and early modern periods, however, castellanships had become predominantly senatorial offices held by members of the nobility, especially the higher szlachta and magnate class.

=== Portugal ===
In Portugal, a castellan was known as an Alcaide. Later, the role of the alcaide became an honorary title awarded by the King of Portugal to certain nobles. As the honorary holder of the office of alcaide did not often live near the castle, a delegate started to be appointed to effectively govern it in his place. An honorary holder of the office became known as alcaide-mor (major alcaide) and the delegate became known as the alcaide pequeno (little alcaide) or the alcaide-menor (minor alcaide).

== See also ==
- Seneschal
- Reeve
- Starosta
- Kiladar
- Kotwal
- Argbed
- Kleisourarches
