= Fulk of Guînes =

Fulk of Guînes (French: Foulques de Guînes) (died bef. 1125) was the first Lord of Beirut (1110–c.1117) following its conquest in the wake of the First Crusade. He was from Guînes in the Boulonnais, the second son of Count Baldwin I of Guînes and Christine(Adele). Fulk was distantly related to the counts of Boulogne.

Fulk and his brothers Guy, Hugh and Manasses Robert all gave their consent to a privilege their father granted to his monastic foundation of Saint-Médard at Andres in 1084. Fulk and Hugh, then an archdeacon, witnessed a diploma of Manasses, then count, for the same monastery in 1097. In 1117, Fulk and Guy subscribed the privilege in which Manasses founded a monastery dedicated to Saint Leonard in the suburbs of Guînes.

Fulk probably accompanied Counts Eustace III of Boulogne and Robert II of Flanders on the First Crusade in 1096, along with his three brothers and father. He received the lordship of Beirut after his relative, King Baldwin I of Jerusalem, conquered it, as related in the anonymous short poem, "Verse on the Illustrious Men of the Diocese of Thérouanne who went on the Holy Expedition":

Fulcho Gisnensis urbem tenuit Baruth, in qua Antistes sedit Balduinus Boloniensis	Fulk of Guînes held the city of Beirut, which Baldwin of Boulogne, standing before it, besieged.

Fulk was dead by 1125, when Walter I Brisebarre was Lord of Beirut. According to Lambert of Ardres he was buried in Palestine: "Fulk, count before Beirut in the promised land [was] there finally buried" (Fulconem in terra promissionis comitem apud Baruth, ibique demum sepultum).

== Sources ==
- Lambert of Ardres (2001). Shopkow, Leah (ed.). The History of the Counts of Guines and Lords of Ardres. University of Pennsylvania Press.

New title	Lord of Beirut; 1110–c. 1117	Succeeded by Walter I Brisebarre
