= Treaty of Guînes =

Unratified treaty of the Hundred Years' War

- Type: Treaty of perpetual peace
- Context: Hundred Years' War
- Drafted: March 1353 – April 1354
- Signed: 6 April 1354
- Location: Guînes, France
- Effective: Not ratified
- Mediators: Pope Innocent VI; Cardinal Guy of Boulogne
- Negotiators: Bishop of Norwich and others; Archbishop of Rouen and others
- Original signatories: Bishop of Norwich and others; Archbishop of Rouen and others
- Parties: Kingdom of England; Kingdom of France

The location of some places mentioned in the text, shown within modern France

The Treaty of Guînes ([ɡin], gheen) was a draft settlement to end the Hundred Years' War, negotiated between England and France and signed at Guînes on 6 April 1354. The war had broken out in 1337 and was further aggravated in 1340 when the English king, Edward III, claimed the French throne. The war went badly for France: the French army was heavily defeated at the Battle of Crécy, and the French town of Calais was besieged and captured. With both sides exhausted, a truce was agreed that, despite being only fitfully observed, was repeatedly renewed.

When English adventurers seized the strategically located town of Guînes in 1352, full-scale fighting broke out again. This did not go well for the French, as money and enthusiasm for the war ran out and state institutions ceased to function. Encouraged by the new pope, Innocent VI, negotiations for a permanent peace treaty opened at Guînes in early March 1353. These broke down, although a truce was again agreed and again not fully observed by either side. In early 1354 a faction in favour of peace with England gained influence in the French king's council. Negotiations were reopened and the English emissaries suggested that Edward would abandon his claim to the French throne in exchange for French territory. This was rapidly agreed and a draft treaty was formally signed on 6 April.

The treaty was supposed to be ratified by each country and announced by Innocent in October at the papal palace in Avignon. By then the French king, John II, had a new council that turned entirely against the treaty and John had decided that another round of warfare might leave him in a better negotiating position. The draft treaty was acrimoniously repudiated and war broke out again in June 1355. In 1356, the French royal army was defeated at the Battle of Poitiers and John was captured. In 1360, both sides agreed to the Treaty of Brétigny, which largely replicated the Treaty of Guînes, but was slightly less generous towards the English. War again flared up in 1369 and the Hundred Years' War finally ended in 1453, 99 years after the Treaty of Guînes was signed.

== Background ==
Since 1153 the English Crown had controlled the Duchy of Aquitaine, which extended across a large part of south-west France. By the 1330s this had been reduced to Gascony. A series of disagreements between France and England regarding the status of these lands culminated on 24 May 1337 in the council of the French king, Philip VI, declaring them forfeit. This marked the start of the Hundred Years' War, which was to last 116 years. In 1340 the English king, Edward III, as the closest male relative of Philip's predecessor Charles IV, laid formal claim to the Kingdom of France. This permitted his allies who were also vassals of the French crown to lawfully wage war on it. Edward was not fully committed to this claim and was repeatedly prepared to repudiate it in exchange for his claims to historically English territory in south-west France being satisfied.

In 1346 Edward led an army across northern France, storming and sacking the Norman town of Caen, defeating the French with great loss of life at the Battle of Crécy and laying siege to the port of Calais. With French finances and morale at a low ebb after Crécy, Philip failed to relieve the town and the starving defenders surrendered on 3 August 1347. With both sides financially exhausted, Pope Clement VI dispatched emissaries to negotiate a truce. On 28 September the Truce of Calais was agreed, bringing a temporary halt to the fighting. The agreement strongly favoured the English, confirming them in possession of all of their territorial conquests. It was agreed that it would expire nine months later on 7 July 1348 but was extended repeatedly over the years. The truce did not stop ongoing naval clashes between the two countries, nor small-scale fighting in Gascony and Brittany. In August 1350 John II succeeded his father, Philip, as King of France.

In early January 1352 a band of freelancing English soldiers seized the French-held town of Guînes by a midnight escalade. The French garrison of Guînes was not expecting an attack and the English crossed the moat, scaled the walls, killed the sentries, stormed the keep, released a group of English prisoners being held there and took over the whole castle. The French were furious and their envoys rushed to London to deliver a strong protest to Edward. Edward was thereby put in a difficult position. The English had been strengthening the defences of Calais with the construction of small fortifications at bottlenecks on the roads through the marshes to the town. These could not compete with the strength of the defences at Guînes that would greatly improve the security of the English enclave around Calais, but retaining it would be a flagrant breach of the truce then in force. Edward would suffer a loss of honour and possibly a resumption of open warfare, for which he was unprepared. He ordered the English occupants to hand Guînes back.

By coincidence, the English parliament was scheduled to meet, its opening session due on 17 January. Several members of the King's Council made fiery, warmongering speeches and the parliament was persuaded to approve three years of war taxes. Reassured that he had adequate financial backing, Edward changed his mind. By the end of January the Captain of Calais had fresh orders: to take over the garrisoning of Guînes in the King's name. The Englishmen who had captured the town were rewarded. Determined to strike back, the French took desperate measures to raise money and set about raising an army. Thus the opportunistic capture of Guînes resulted in the war resuming.

== Prelude ==
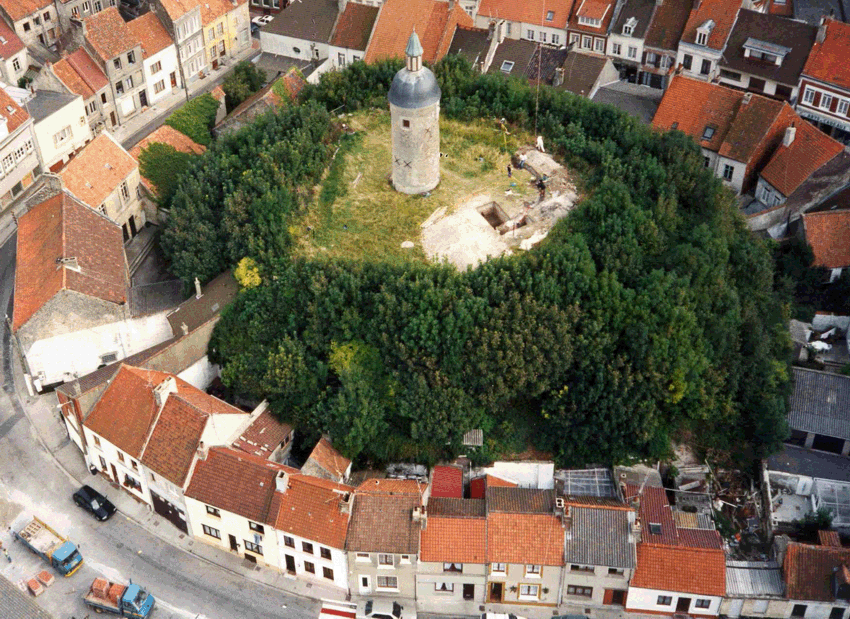
The motte and keep of Guînes castle in 2012

The resumption of hostilities caused fighting to flare up in Brittany and the Saintonge area of south-west France, but the main French effort was against Guînes. The French assembled an army of 4,500 men, including 1,500 men-at-arms and a large force of Italian crossbowmen under the command of Geoffrey of Charny, a senior and well-respected Burgundian knight in French service and the keeper of the Oriflamme, the French royal battle banner. By May 1352 the 115 men of the English garrison, commanded by Thomas Hogshaw, were under siege. The French reoccupied the town, but found it difficult to approach the castle because of the marshy terrain and the strength of its barbican.

By the end of May, the English authorities had raised a force of more than 6,000 which was gradually shipped to Calais. From there they harassed the French in what the modern historian Jonathan Sumption describes as "savage and continual fighting" throughout June and early July. In mid-July a large contingent of troops arrived from England and, reinforced by much of the Calais garrison, were successful in approaching Guînes undetected and launching a night attack on the French camp. Many Frenchmen were killed and a large part of the palisade around their positions was destroyed. Shortly after, Charny abandoned the siege, leaving a garrison to hold the town.

in August the French army in Brittany was defeated by a smaller English force at the Battle of Mauron with heavy losses, especially among its leadership and men-at-arms. In south-west France there was scattered fighting across the Agenais, Périgord and Quercy with the English getting the better of it; French morale in the area was poor and they despaired of being able to drive off the English.

== Treaty ==
=== Negotiations ===
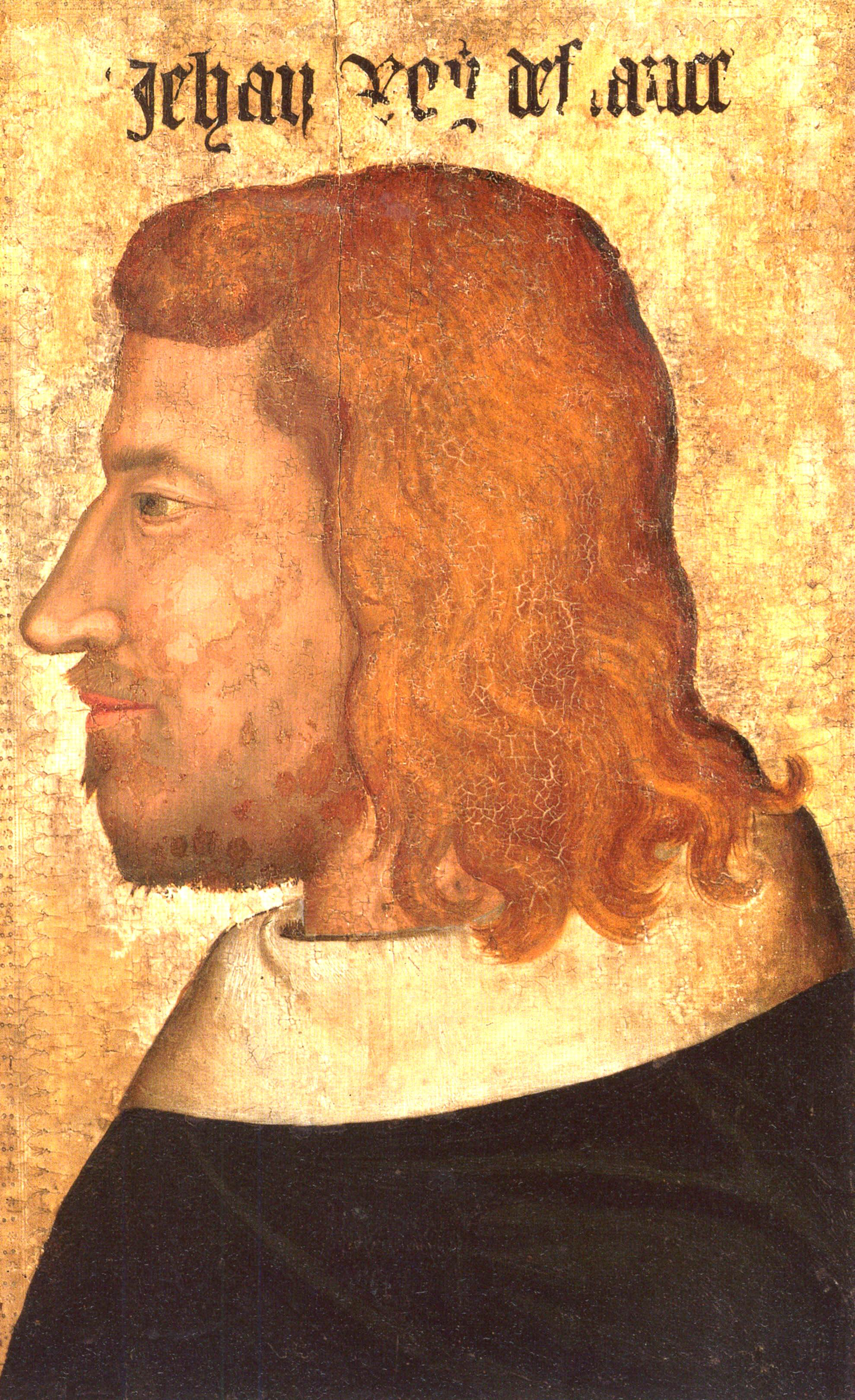
A contemporary image of the French king, John II

The war was going badly for the French on all fronts and money and enthusiasm for the war was running out. Sumption describes the French administration as "fall[ing] apart in jealous acrimony and recrimination". The new pope, Innocent VI, a relative of John's, encouraged negotiations for a permanent peace treaty and discussions opened at Guînes in early March 1353 overseen by the Cardinal Guy of Boulogne. The modern historian George Cuttino states that Innocent was acting at John's instigation. The English sent a senior deputation: Henry of Lancaster, one of Edward's most trusted and experienced military lieutenants; Michael Northburgh, keeper of the privy seal; William Bateman the Bishop of Norwich, the most experienced diplomat in England; and Simon Islip, an ex-keeper of the privy seal and the archbishop of Canterbury; among others. The French were represented by Pierre de La Forêt, Archbishop of Rouen and John's Chancellor; Charles of Spain, who was the Constable of France and a close confident of John; Robert de Lorris, John's Chamberlain; Guillaume Bertrand, the Bishop of Beauvais; and several other high-ranking figures. Both parties were ill-prepared and ill-briefed with only two of the French delegation having any previous negotiating experience with the English. After several meetings it was agreed they would adjourn to receive further instructions from their monarchs, reconvening on 19 May. Until then hostilities would be suspended by a formal truce. This temporary agreement was signed and sealed on 10 March.

In early May 1353 the English requested the negotiations not be restarted until June, to allow them to discuss the matter more fully. The French responded on 8 May by cancelling the truce and announcing an arrière-ban for Normandy, a formal call to arms for all able-bodied males. The negotiators met briefly in Paris on 26 July and extended the truce until November, although all concerned understood that much fighting would continue. French central and local government collapsed. French nobles took to violently settling old scores rather than fighting the English. Charles of Navarre, one of the most powerful figures in France, broke into the bedroom of Charles of Spain and murdered him as he knelt naked, pleading for his life. Navarre then boasted of it and made tentative approaches to the English regarding an alliance. Navarre and John formally reconciled in March 1354 and a new balance within the French government was reached; this was more in favour of peace with England, in some quarters at almost any price. Informal talks started again at Guînes in mid-March. The principle whereby Edward abandoned his claim to the French throne in exchange for French territory was agreed; Edward gave his assent to this on 30 March. Formal negotiations recommenced in early April. The French were represented by Forêt, Lorris and Bertrand again, joined by Robert le Coq, Bishop of Laon, Robert, Count of Roucy, and Jean, Count of Châtillon. The makeup of the English delegation is not known. Discussions were rapidly concluded. A formal truce for a year was agreed, as was the broad outline of a permanent peace. On 6 April 1354 these heads of terms were formally signed by the representatives of both countries, witnessed by Guy of Boulogne.

=== Agreement ===
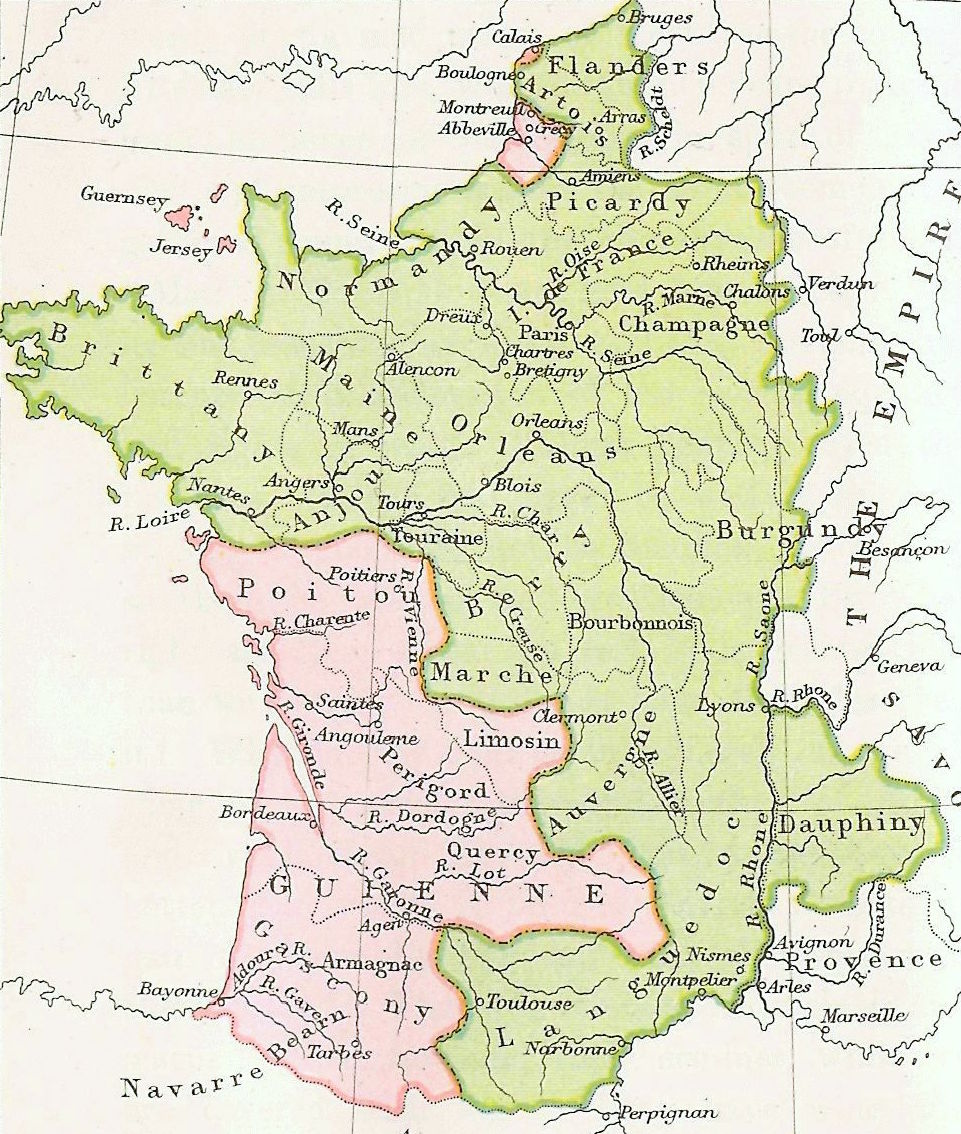
France after the later (1360) Treaty of Brétigny; the territorial settlement was similar to that proposed in the failed Treaty of Guînes: French territory in green, English territory in pink.

The treaty was very much in the favour of the English. England was to gain the whole of Aquitaine, Poitou, Maine, Anjou, Touraine and Limousin – the large majority of western France – as well as Ponthieu and the Pale of Calais. All were to be held as sovereign English territory, not as a fief of the French crown as English possessions in France had previously been. It was also a treaty of friendship between the two nations and both France's alliance with Scotland – over which Edward claimed suzerainty – and England's with Flanders – which was technically a province of France – were to be abandoned. The truce was to be immediately publicised, while the fact that the outline of a peace treaty had been agreed was to be kept secret until 1 October, when Innocent would announce it at the papal palace in Avignon. In the same ceremony, English representatives would repudiate the English claim to John's throne and the French would formally relinquish sovereignty over the agreed provinces. Edward was overjoyed, the English parliament ratified the treaty sight unseen. The English party for the ceremony departed more than four months before they were due in Avignon. John also endorsed the treaty, but members of his council were less enthusiastic.

=== Repudiation ===
The English adhered to the truce, but John of Armagnac, the French commander in the south-west, ignored his orders to observe the peace; however, his offensive was ineffectual. Details of how much of the treaty was known to the French ruling elite and their debates regarding it are lacking, but sentiment was against its terms. In August it was revealed that several of the men who had negotiated and signed the treaty had been deeply involved in the plot to murder Charles of Spain. At least three of John's closest councillors fled his court or were expelled. By early September the French court had turned against the treaty. The date for formal ceremony in Avignon was suspended.

In November 1354 John seized all of Navarre's lands, besieging those places which did not surrender. Planned negotiations in Avignon to finalise the details of the treaty did not take place in the absence of French ambassadors. The English emissaries who were to formally announce the agreement arrived amidst much pomp in late December. John had meanwhile decided that another round of warfare might leave him in a better negotiating position and the French planned an ambitious series of offensives for the 1355 campaigning season. The French ambassadors arrived in Avignon in mid-January, repudiated the previous agreement and attempted to reopen negotiations. The English and the Cardinal of Boulogne pressed them to adhere to the existing treaty. The impasse continued for a month. Simultaneously the English delegation plotted an anti-French alliance with Navarre. By the end of February the futility of their official missions was obvious to all and the delegations departed with much acrimony. Their one achievement was a formal extension of the ill-observed truce to 24 June. It was clear that from then both sides would be committed to full-scale war.

== Aftermath ==
The war resumed in 1355, with both Edward and his son, Edward the Black Prince, fighting in separate campaigns in France. In 1356 the French royal army was defeated by a smaller Anglo-Gascon force at the Battle of Poitiers and John was captured. In 1360, the fighting was brought to a temporary halt by the Treaty of Brétigny, which largely replicated the Treaty of Guînes, with slightly less generous terms for the English. By this treaty vast areas of France were ceded to England, including Guînes and its county which became part of the Pale of Calais. In 1369 large-scale fighting broke out again and the Hundred Years' War did not end until 1453, 99 years after the Treaty of Guînes was signed.

== Citations and sources ==
=== Sources ===
- Bothwell, James (2001). The Age of Edward III. Woodbridge, Suffolk: York Medieval Press. ISBN 1-903153-06-9.
- Burne, Alfred (1999) [1955]. The Crecy War. Ware, Hertfordshire: Wordsworth Editions. ISBN 978-1-84022-210-4.
- Curry, Anne (2002). The Hundred Years' War 1337–1453. Essential Histories. Oxford: Osprey Publishing. ISBN 978-1-84176-269-2.
- Cuttino, George Peddy (1985). English Medieval Diplomacy. Bloomington, Indiana: Indiana University Press. ISBN 978-0-253-31954-8.
- Fowler, Kenneth (1969). The King's Lieutenant: Henry of Grosmont, First Duke of Lancaster, 1310–1361. New York: Barnes & Noble. ISBN 978-0-389-01003-6. OCLC 164491035.
- Harari, Yuval N. (2007). "For a Sack-full of Gold Écus: Calais 1350". Special Operations in the Age of Chivalry, 1100–1550. Woodbridge, Suffolk: Boydell Press. pp. 109–124. ISBN 978-1-84383-292-8.
- Kaeuper, Richard W. & Kennedy, Elspeth (1996). The Book of Chivalry of Geoffroi de Charny: Text, Context, and Translation. Philadelphia: University of Pennsylvania Press. ISBN 978-0-8122-3348-3.
- Rogers, Clifford (2014) [2000]. War Cruel and Sharp: English Strategy under Edward III, 1327–1360. Woodbridge, Suffolk: Boydell Press. ISBN 978-0-85115-804-4.
- Sumption, Jonathan (1990). Trial by Battle. The Hundred Years' War. Vol. I. London: Faber and Faber. ISBN 0-571-20095-8.
- Sumption, Jonathan (1999). Trial by Fire. The Hundred Years' War. Vol. II. London: Faber and Faber. ISBN 0-571-13896-9.
- Wagner, John A. (2006a). "Calais, Truce of (1347)". Encyclopedia of the Hundred Years War. Westport, Connecticut; London: Greenwood. pp. 74–75. ISBN 0-313-32736-X.
- Wagner, John A. (2006b). "Guines, Treaty of". Encyclopedia of the Hundred Years War. Westport, Connecticut; London: Greenwood. pp. 142–143. ISBN 0-313-32736-X.
- Wagner, John A. (2006c). "Hundred Years' War, Causes of". Encyclopedia of the Hundred Years War. Westport, Connecticut; London: Greenwood. pp. 157–159. ISBN 0-313-32736-X.
