= Raoul de Guînes =

Third Count of Guînes

Raoul de Guînes (c. 992-30 May 1036), or Ralph, Rodolphe, or Rudolph, was the third Count of Guînes. He was the son of Ardolf, Count of Guînes and Matilda, the daughter of Count Erniculus of Boulogne. He had one brother, Roger, who died young.

According to Lambert of Ardres, Raoul "lived too prodigally, was unjust and hateful to his people, and died not a timely but a miserable death through their rebukes." Raoul stands out for being a tyrant of a ruler. According to Lambert, Raoul did not have enough of his own property to apportion to his retinue, so he "rampaged among his subjects," demanding unjust exactions and constantly plundered, slandered, and oppressed them.

He died in a tournament in Paris. Lambert goes into detail describing Raoul's death: after receiving a wound to his stomach, Raoul was thrown off his horse by arrows coming from archers (which also pierced his right eye). Then, they seized the count, "who was only half alive, and despoiled him." After he was clearly dead, "they were moved by no mercy and threw him unmercifully into the Seine, whereupon he was never seen again."

== Marriage and children ==
Raoul married Rosella of Saint-Pol, daughter of Count Hugh of Saint-Pol. They had at least one son, Eustace, Count of Guînes.

According to Sir Bernard Burke's peerage, two more sons were born to Rauol and Rosella: William le Blount and Robert le Blount. These two brothers were born in the County of Guînes and, along with Eustace, accompanied William the Conqueror to England in 1066. After this, Eustace returned to his native country, but both William and Robert stayed in England.

The two le Blount brothers are the originators of the Blount family in England. Sir William le Blount, the younger of the two le Blount brothers, was a general of foot at Hastings, and was rewarded with grants of several lordships in Lincolnshire. Sir Robert le Blount was in command of William the Conqueror's war ships and was styled "Dux Navium Militarium." He was created the 1st feudal Baron of Ixworth (his place of residence), and Lord of Orford Castle.
