= Baldwin I of Guînes =

Count of Guînes, Flanders

Baldwin I of Guînes, (c.1038 – c.1090), was the count of Guînes. He fought at the battle of Cassel (1071) for Robert I, Count of Flanders. Later, Baldwin and Enguerrand of Lillers went on pilgrimage to Santiago de Compostela. He founded Andres Abbey and was later buried there in 1090.

== Biography ==
Baldwin was the son of Manasses I of Guînes. His mother's name is unknown. He succeeded his father around 1065. That year he was present at the court of king Philip I of France, when the king approved the charter of Hasnon abbey.

In 1070, Baldwin took the side of Robert I, Count of Flanders, younger brother of Baldwin VI of Flanders, against Richilde, Countess of Hainaut and her son, Arnulf, pretender to the County of Flanders, in the war for Flanders. He was present at the battle of Cassel and Broqueroies.

In 1079, he made the pilgrimage to Santiago de Compostela with Enguerrand, Lord of Lillers. On his return, Baldwin fell ill and was very well cared for at the Abbey of Saint-Sauveur de Charroux. As a reward, they both offered to create monasteries attached to their fiefs. Enguerrand founded the Abbey of Ham-en-Artois (near Lillers), while Baldwin founded Andres Abbey.

Baldwin died c. 1090 and was buried in the chapel of Andres Abbey.

== Marriage and children ==
Baldwin married Adele Christine, daughter of Florent of Lorraine. They had:

- Gisèle (c. 1075), married around 1101 Wenemar, Burgrave of Ghent, then castellan of Ghent, lord of Bornhem.
- Adèle (c. 1080 -c.1142), married Geoffrey IV, lord of Semur
- Manassès called Robert (c. 1075 - 18 December 1137), Count of Guînes
- Fulk (d.1125), becomes Count of Beirut
- Guy,
- Hughes, archdeacon of Thérouanne

== Sources ==
- Frachette, Christian (1993). Les Princes et le Pouvoir au Moyen Âge. Publications de la Sorbonne. pp. 155–165.
- Lambert of Ardres (2001). Shopkow, Leah (ed.). The History of the Counts of Guines and Lords of Ardres. University of Pennsylvania Press.
- Nieus, Jean-François (2010). "Les conflits familiaux et leur traitement dans l'Historia comitum Ghisnensium de Lambert d'Ardres". In Martin Aurell (ed.). La Parenté déchirée: les luttes intrafamiliales au Moyen Âge. Brepols. pp. 343–358.
- Patterson, Robert, ed. (1989). The Haskins Society Journal Studies in Medieval History. Vol. 1. The Hambledon Press.
- Tanner, Heather (2004). Families, Friends and Allies: Boulogne and Politics in Northern France and England, c.879-1160. Brill.
