= Ardolf, Count of Guînes =

Count of Guines

Ardolf I, Count of Guînes (Ardulf, Ardolph, Ardolphus), also known as Ardulf of Guînes, was born about 965–966. His father was Siegfried, Count of Guînes and his mother was Elftrude, daughter of Arnulf I, Count of Flanders and Adele of Vermandois.

According to legend, Ardolf was born to Elftrude after his father, Siegfried, had died. His cousin, Arnulf II, Count of Flanders, was his godfather. According to Lambert of Ardres, Ardolf grew up in the court of the Counts of Flanders and rose to be a favorite of his first cousin and godfather, swearing to military oaths and was created a knight by Arnulf II. Arnulf II also appointed him Count of Guînes.

Ardolf married Matilda, the daughter of Count Erniculus of Boulogne. Ardolf and Matilda had issue:

- Raoul de Guînes (Ralph, Rodolphe)
- Roger (died young, before entering puberty)
