= Thomas Hogshaw =

English knight

Thomas Hogshaw (Note: Also Thomas Hoggeshaw or Hogshawe) (died c.1374), Lord of Milstead, was an English knight of Edward III of England's household. He was captain of the garrison of the castle of Guînes which held off the besieging French forces under Geoffrey de Charny between January and July 1352.

He married Emmeline, daughter of Edmund de Clevedon. Thomas' heir was his son Edmund who was approximately three years of age, at his mother's death. Edmund died in his minority and his heirs were his sisters Joan and Margaret. Joan was married to Thomas Lovell and Margaret to John Bluet.
