= Manasses I of Guînes =

Manasses I or Manasses the Old was the count of Guînes in the middle of the 11th century.

Since he is not mentioned in the 12th-century History of the Counts of Guînes by Lambert of Ardres, Manasses has been largely ignored by historians, but his existence is certain. On 13 November 1056, he witnessed a charter of Count Baldwin V of Flanders confirming the possessions of Saint Peter's Abbey in Harnes. Among his co-signatories were Count Guy I of Ponthieu, Count Roger of Saint-Pol, Earl Harold of Wessex and the future Bishop Guy of Amiens. Manasses may have been a son of Roger of Saint-Pol.

Manasses is called "Manasar the Old" in the early 12th-century Gesta Herewardi. This nickname served to distinguish him from the then ruling count of Guînes, Manasses II. According to the Gesta, Hereward the Wake, sailing from Orkney, was shipwrecked on the Flemish coast near Saint-Bertin and taken in by Manasses. He later entered the service of the count of Flanders as a mercenary and fought against Manasses, even capturing his nephew or grandson Hoibrict. According to Philip Grierson, although the details in the Gesta are mainly legendary, the shipwreck itself is historical. The count of Guînes controlled the coast and would have had authority over shipwrecks. This probably took place in the early 1060s.

The name of Manasses' wife is unknown. He was succeeded as count by his son, Baldwin I, no later than 1065.

== Bibliography ==
- Grierson, Philip (1941). "The Relations between England and Flanders before the Norman Conquest". Transactions of the Royal Historical Society. 23: 71–112. JSTOR 3678655.
- Licence, Tom (2026). Harold: Warrior King. Yale University Press.
- Nieus, Jean-François (2010). "Les conflits familiaux et leur traitement dans l'Historia comitum Ghisnensium de Lambert d'Ardres". In Martin Aurell (ed.). La Parenté déchirée: les luttes intrafamiliales au Moyen Âge. Brepols. pp. 343–358.
- Rex, Peter (2005). Hereward: The Last Englishman. Tempus.
- Swanton, Michael (1998). "The Deeds of Hereward". In Thomas H. Ohlgren (ed.). Medieval Outlaws: Ten Tales in Modern English. Sutton Publishing. pp. 12–60.
- Tanner, Heather (2004). Families, Friends and Allies: Boulogne and Politics in Northern France and England, c.879–1160. Brill.
- Van Houts, Elisabeth (1999). "Hereward and Flanders". Anglo-Saxon England. 28: 201–223.
- Vanderkindere, Léon (1899). Histoire de la formation territoriale des principautés belges au Moyen Âge. Vol. 1. Hayez.
