= Château de Guînes =

Former French castle

Coordinates: 50.8689°N 1.8690°E

Château de Guînes was a castle in Guînes, Pas-de-Calais, France.

== History ==
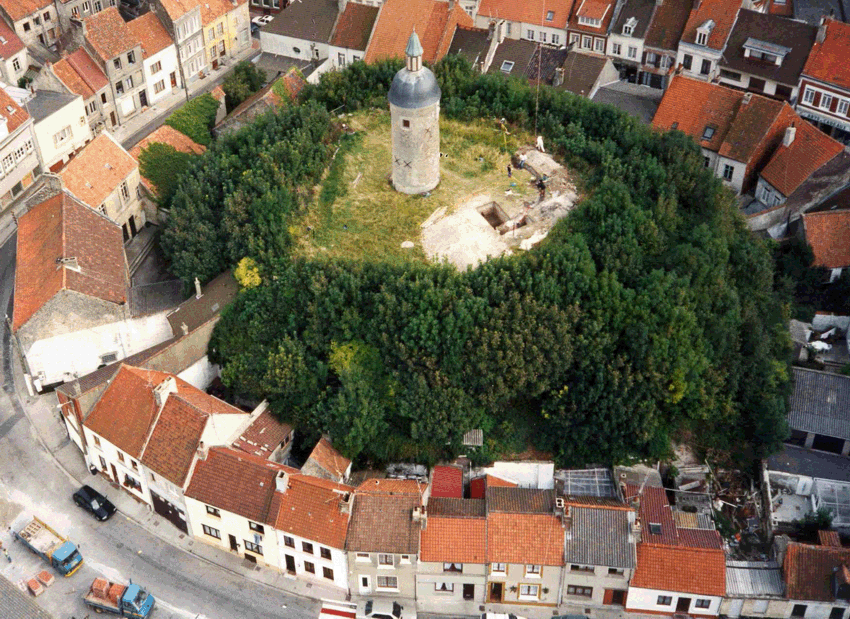
Motte of château de Guînes

Baldwin II, Count of Guînes, began construction of a castle at Guînes on top of an ancient fort in the late 12th century, consisting of a courtyard, surrounded by towers with a donjon.

After the capture of Calais by King Edward III of England in 1349, the castle was captured by the English in 1352 by an English force led by the valet John of Doncaster. The French laid siege to the castle to regain control, however the siege was unsuccessful. In 1360, the Treaty of Brétigny surrendered the city and its county to England becoming part of the Pale of Calais.

Philip the Good, Duke of Burgundy, laid siege to Guînes in 1436 with a force of Flemish militia. When an English relief army of some 10,000 men under Humphrey, Duke of Gloucester, approached, the Duke of Burgundy abandoned the siege, leaving his artillery and large amounts of baggage behind. Francis d'Orléans, Count of Angoulême, laid siege to Guînes in 1514, but broke the siege upon learning of the approach of an English army under the command of King Henry VIII of England.

The castle was placed under siege by a French army in 1558, led by Francis, Duke of Guise. The castle withstood the siege for a few days. The English commander, William Grey, 13th Baron Grey de Wilton, was forced to surrender the castle, on 21 January, after the French entered the outer defences of the castle, Grey was wounded and his soldiers refused to fight on. The French gave honourable terms of surrender and English rule of the area came to an end. The castle was badly slighted by the Duke of Guise, but it was known to be used to house the local commander. It was later destroyed during the Spanish incursions during 1595 to 1598.
