= Bourbourg =

Bourbourg Broekburg
- Commune
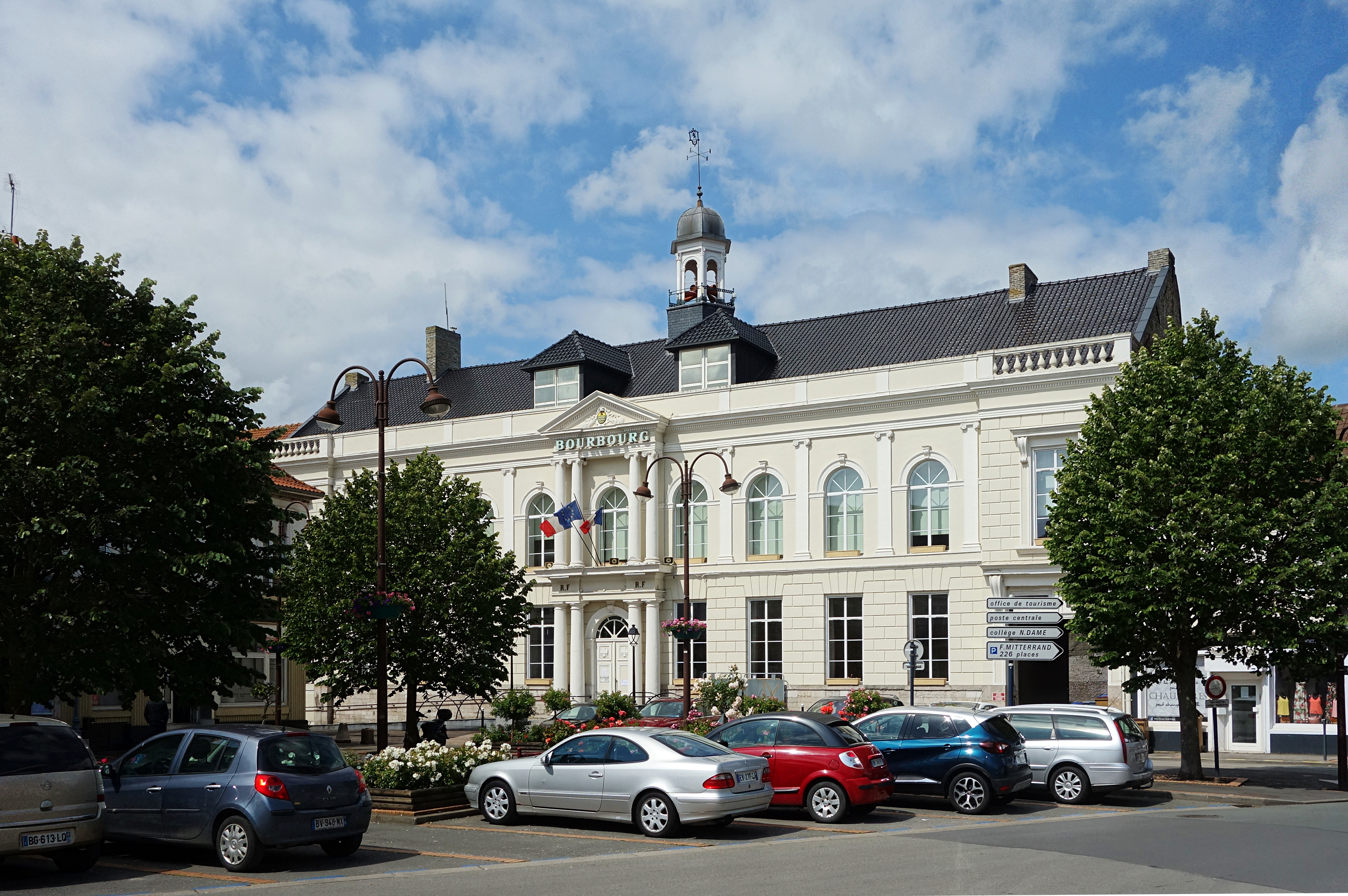
- Town hall

- Coat of arms
- Location of Bourbourg
- Location within France Location within Hauts-de-France
- Coordinates: 50°56′50″N 2°11′55″E
- Country: France
- Region: Hauts-de-France
- Department: Nord
- Arrondissement: Dunkerque
- Canton: Grande-Synthe
- Intercommunality: CU de Dunkerque

Government
  - Mayor (2020–2026): Eric Gens
- Area^{1}: 38.49 km^{2} (14.86 sq mi)
- Elevation: 3 m (9.8 ft)
- Highest elevation: 10 m (33 ft)
- Lowest elevation: 0 m (0 ft)
- Population (2023): 6,931
  - Density: 180.1/km^{2} (466.4/sq mi)
- Time zone: UTC+01:00 (CET)
  - Summer (DST): UTC+02:00 (CEST)
- INSEE/Postal code: 59094 /59630
- ^{1} French Land Register data, which excludes lakes, ponds, glaciers > 1 km^{2} (0.386 sq mi or 247 acres) and river estuaries.

Bourbourg (French pronunciation: [buʁbuʁ]; West Flemish: Broekburg) is a commune in the Nord department in northern France. It is on the maritime plain of northern France, in the middle of a triangle formed by Dunkirk, Calais, and Saint-Omer.

== Population ==
In 1945 Bourbourg absorbed the former commune of Bourbourg-Campagne. The population data given in the table and graph below for 1936 and earlier refer to Bourbourg proper, without Bourbourg-Campagne.

Historical population

Year	Pop.	±% p.a.
1793	2,084	—
1800	1,966	−0.83%
1806	2,004	+0.32%
1821	2,273	+0.84%
1831	2,378	+0.45%
1836	2,527	+1.22%
1841	2,474	−0.42%
1846	2,325	−1.23%
1851	2,528	+1.69%
1856	2,597	+0.54%
1861	2,615	+0.14%
1866	2,634	+0.14%
1872	2,574	−0.38%
1876	2,477	−0.96%
1881	2,392	−0.70%
1886	2,414	+0.18%
1891	2,468	+0.44%
1896	2,513	+0.36%
1901	2,586	+0.57%

Year	Pop.	±% p.a.
1906	2,482	−0.82%
1911	2,422	−0.49%
1921	2,489	+0.27%
1926	2,203	−2.41%
1931	2,198	−0.05%
1936	2,124	−0.68%
1946	5,469	+9.92%
1954	5,564	+0.22%
1962	5,868	+0.67%
1968	6,076	+0.58%
1975	7,292	+2.64%
1982	7,341	+0.10%
1990	7,106	−0.41%
1999	6,908	−0.31%
2007	6,696	−0.39%
2012	7,002	+0.90%
2017	7,097	+0.27%
2023	6,931	−0.39%

Source: EHESS and INSEE (1968-2023)

== Heraldry ==
Arms of Bourbourg	The arms of Bourbourg are blazoned: Azure, 3 triple barrulets, and on a chief Or, a lion sable. (Chief of Flanders)

== History ==
In the second half of the 3rd century AD, the North Sea broke through the sand dunes to the Flemish coast in an event known as the "second Dunkirk Transgression". Then, in the 7th century, siltation of the sea intrusion created a vast coastal swamp with some dry areas. Local residents began to use the area's resources base on the polder model between the 7th and 12th centuries.

The first mention of Bourbourg is in 1035, but the settlement is probably older, possibly even from the end of the 9th century. The oldest part of the city is immediately southwest of the parochial St. John's Church, and the town was probably part of a Flemish defensive line against the Normans.

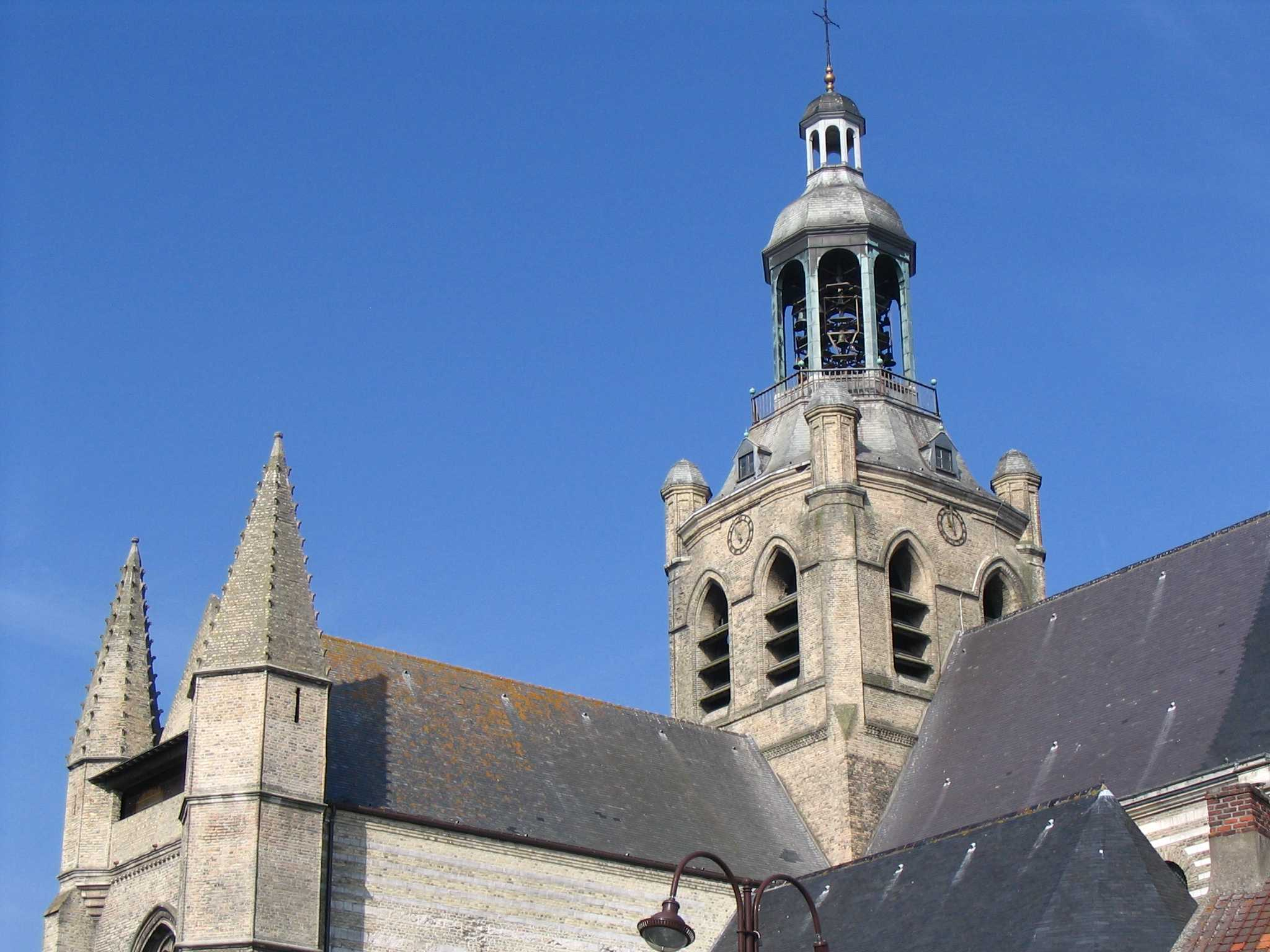
St Jean Baptiste de Bourbourg, Church.

The Church Saint-Jean-Baptiste was founded by Clementia of Burgundy, Countess of Flanders, in 1100 and just south of the city a Benedictine monastery, (St Mary's Abbey) was established by her husband Robert II of Jerusalem. After a while, it became the custom in that monastery that only nuns of noble descent could join, which gave it the name "Abbey of noble ladies". In 1104, the city was named as a fortress and become the centre of a Castellan domain of the same name. The domain was approximately 12,700 ha in 1071 and had ten villages in a triangle between the North Sea, the river Aa and the Lemonades–Loon line.

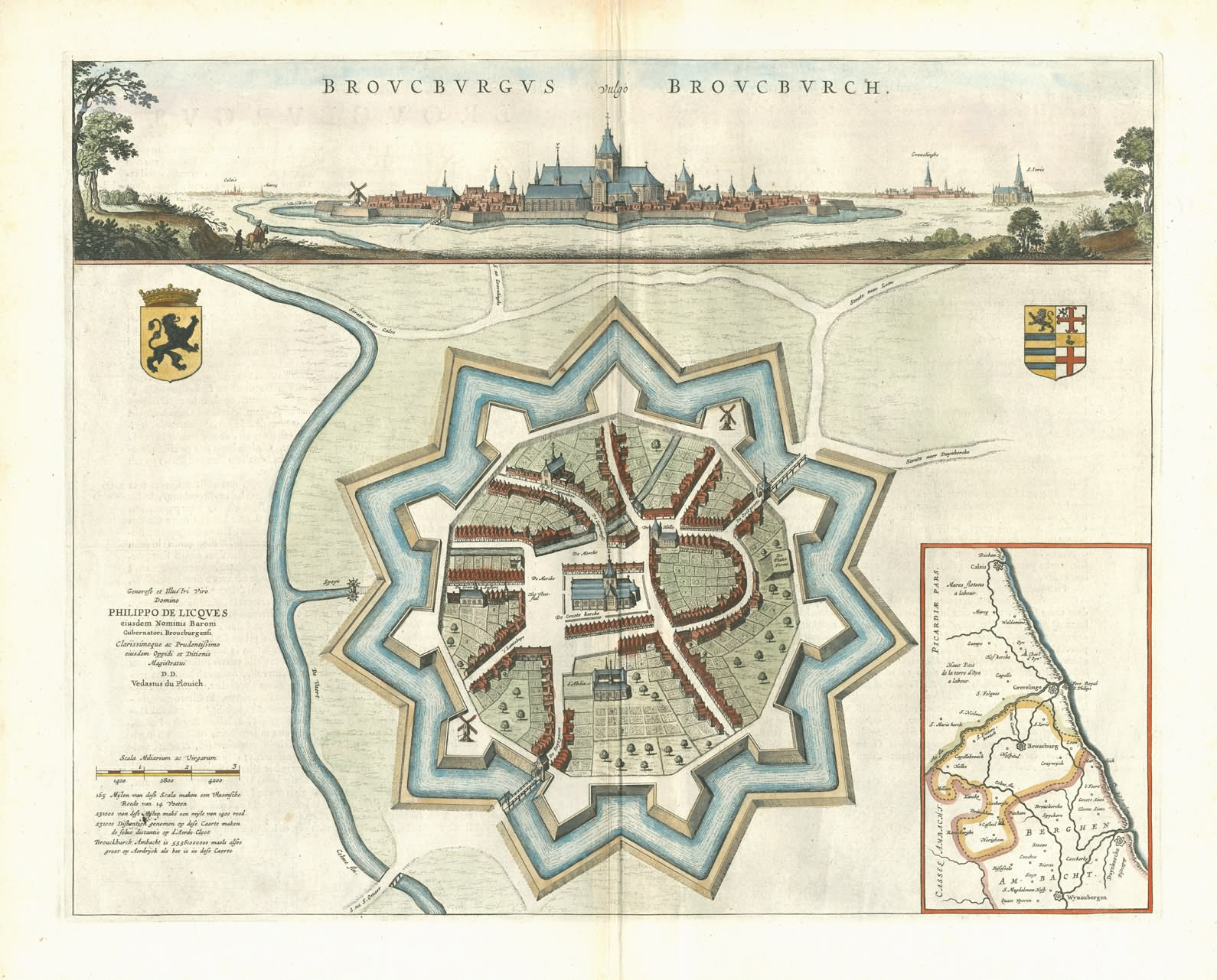
Bourbourg in 1649

The city was important in the wars against the Normans and later in the Hundred Years' War. Following the Armistice of 1375, Bourbourg was in French hands, contributing to the decline of Flanders. In 1382, troops from the city fought in the Battle of Westrozebeke on the side of the French conquerors. The following year, the English took the city before being repulsed by the French.

From then until the 17th century, the city underwent a period of economic and cultural prosperity, and in 1458 was granted authorisation to hold weekly and annual markets. That prosperity lasted until the Franco-Spanish Wars, when the city was in the front line and was repeatedly exchanged between occupying forces.

== Historical sites ==
There are a large number of historic sites to see, such as the former jail. Originally built in 1539 under Spanish rule, the three-storey 18th-century prison building in the main square includes several dungeons and strongrooms. Above the entrance door is a sundial with the motto Qua hora non-putatis, part of a verse from the Bible, Luke 12:40, Et vos estote parati quia qua hora non-putatis Filius hominis venit ("Be you then also ready: for at what hour you think not the Son of man will come").

Other interesting old buildings include the Gothic church (Eglise Saint-Jean-Baptiste), parts of which date from the 13th century, and whose choir shelters a huge installation by Anthony Caro called "The Chapel of Light"; the old Fishmarket (halle au poisson) which dates from 1587 and has twice-weekly fresh fish markets; and a 16th-century fortified farmhouse, the Manoir du Withof.

== Places of interest ==
The town is crossed by the 18th-century canal from Dunkirk to the river Aa. The canal skirts the old town walls built by Philip II of Spain as part of his border defences for Flanders, and was important for carrying agricultural produce to Dunkirk, avoiding the hazards of the North Sea coast. A new boat-stop quay provides facilities for leisure boaters touring the region's canals and waterways to stop here.

Footpaths and cycle routes lead into the attractive flat countryside typical of the coastal area between Calais and Dunkerque.

The town's market day is Tuesday morning; fish markets are on Tuesday and Friday mornings, and there is a Christmas market in the Fishmarket.

== Residents ==
- Charles Étienne Brasseur de Bourbourg (1814–1874), writer, ethnographer, historian and archaeologist who specialized in Mesoamerican history

== Gallery ==
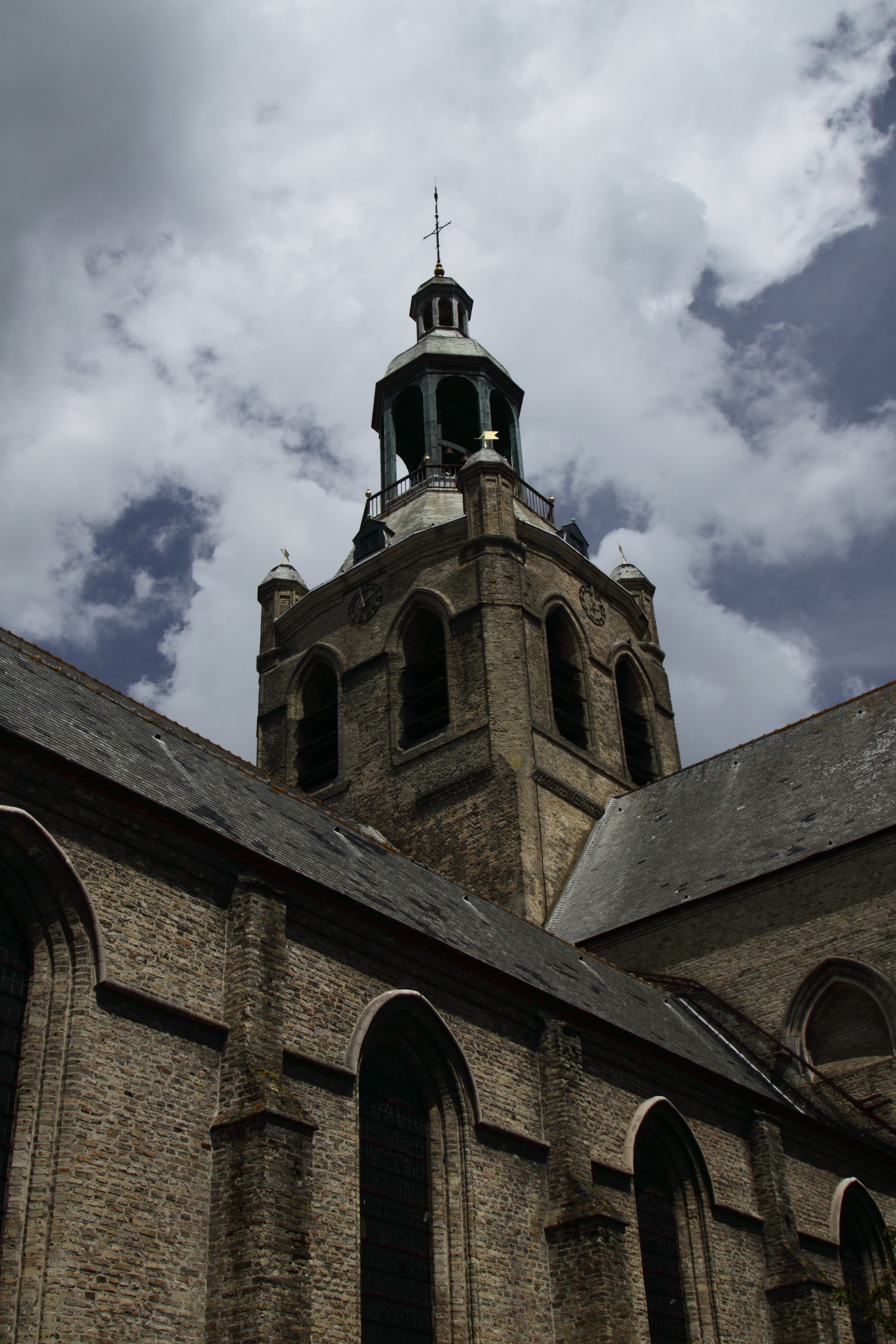
Saint-Jean-Baptiste Church.

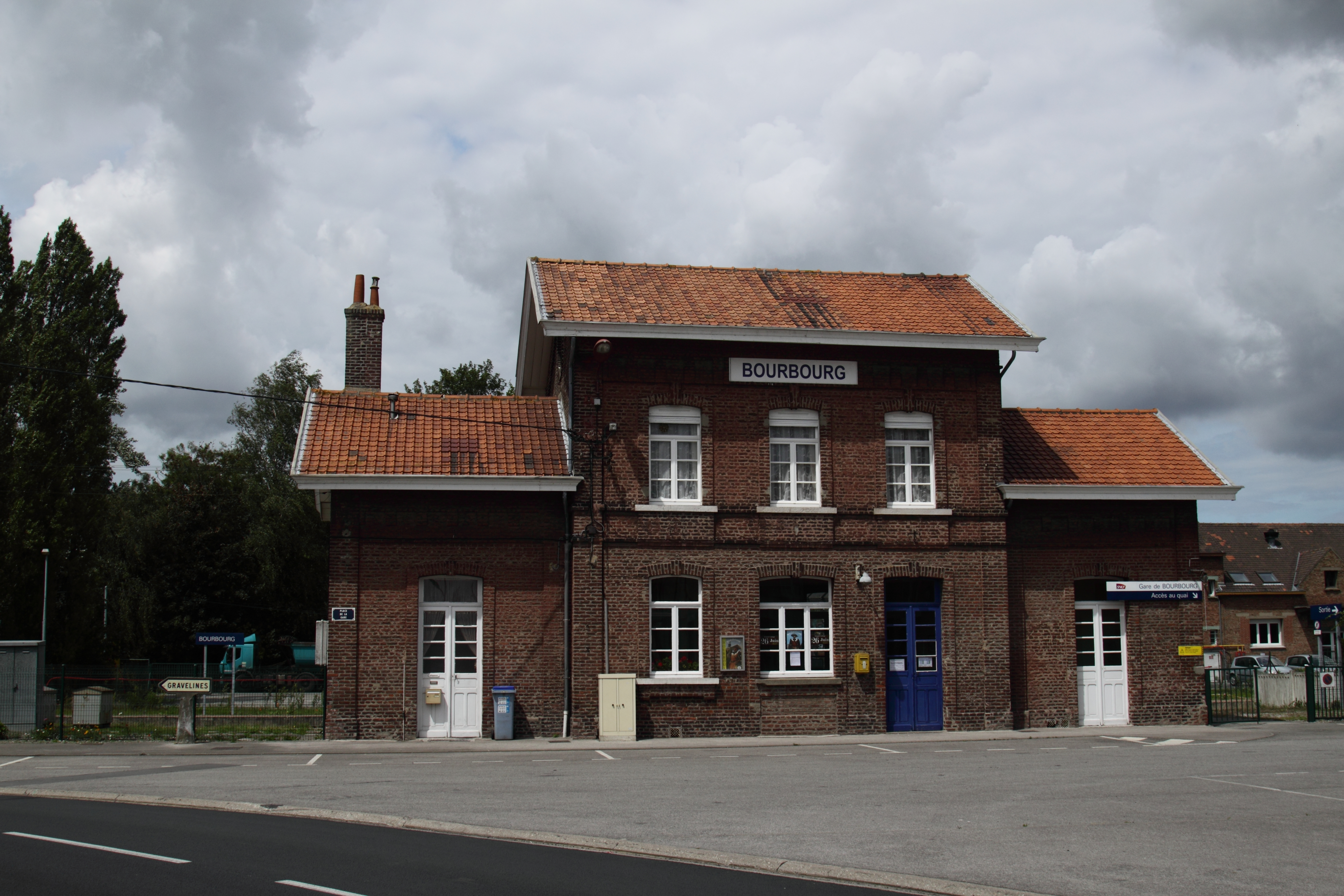
SNCF train station.

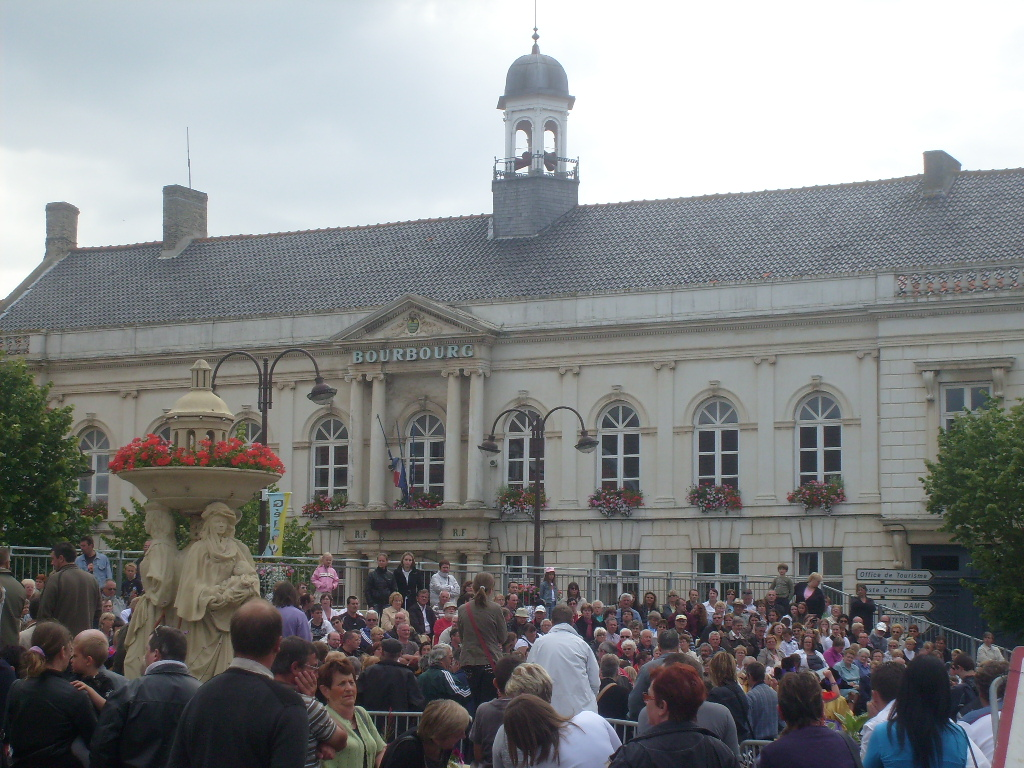
Mairie (town hall).

== See also ==
- Communes of the Nord department
