= County of Guînes =

Flemish fief and later French fief

County of Guînes Comté de Guînes (French)
- 988–1180
- Coat of arms

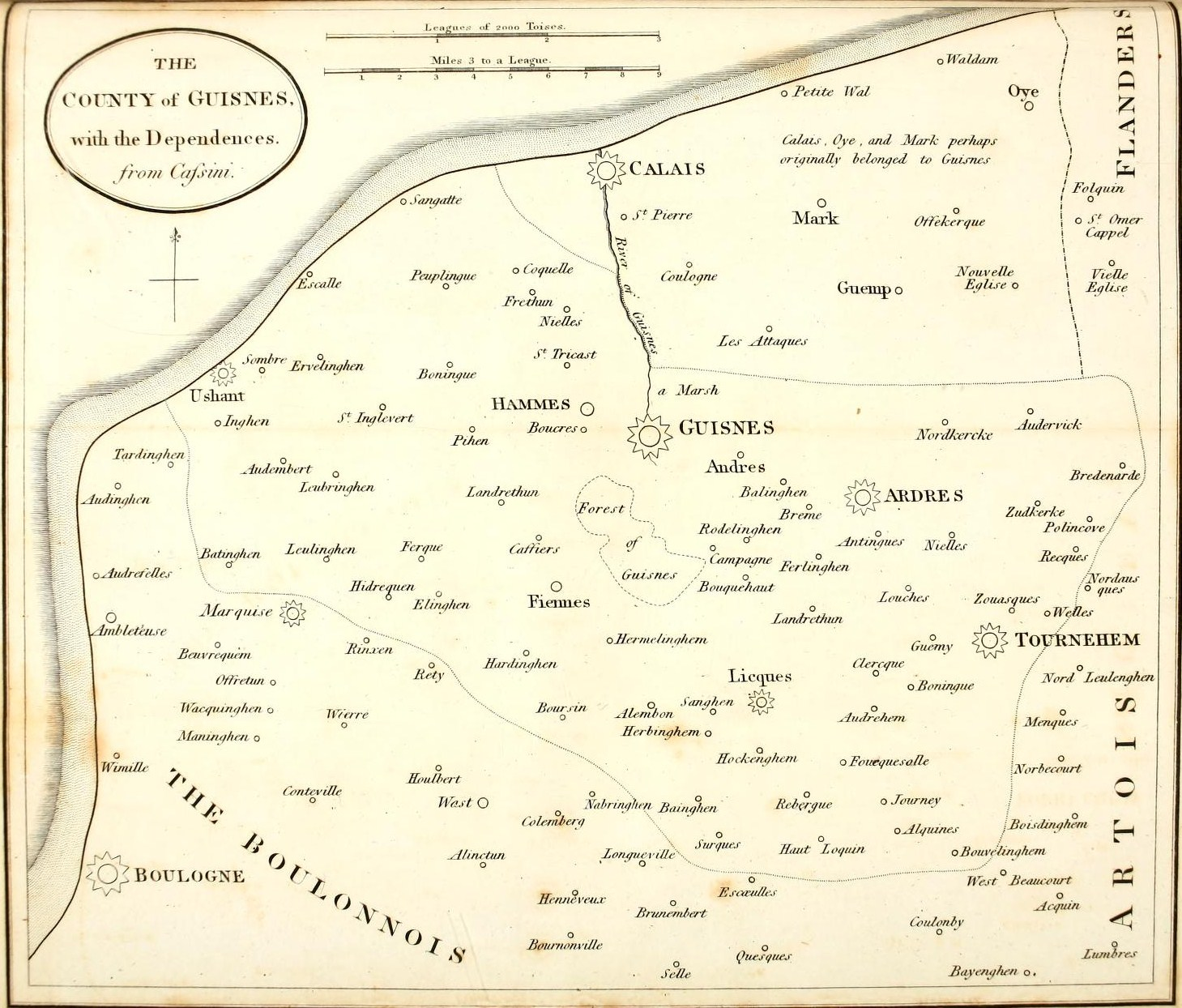
- Map of the County of Guînes
- Status: Part of the Kingdom of France (1180–1501)
- Capital: Guînes
- Historical era: Middle Ages
  - split from the county of County of Boulogne: 988
  - incorporation into the crown lands of France: 1180
| Succeeded by |
| Kingdom of France |

The County of Guînes, was a Flemish fief and later French fief in the Middle Ages.

The county was split from the County of Boulogne in about 988. Though dominated by the larger county of Flanders, it often acted independently. In 1180, Guînes was passed, together with Ardres, Arras and Saint-Omer, to the French crown as part of the dowry of Isabella of Hainaut when she married Philip II of France.

== Counts ==
- ?-c.965 - Siegfried, Count of Guînes
  - Although he never seemed to be formally designated as Count, he is historically referred to as such.
- c.965-? - Ardolf, Count of Guînes
- Raoul, Count of Guînes (son of Ardolf), also known as Ralph or Rodolphe
- fl. 1056 - Manasses I
- 1065-1091 - Baldwin I, Count of Guînes (son of Manasses I), also known as Baudouin
- 1091-1137 - Manasses II (son of Baldwin I)
- 1138-1141 - Aubrey de Vere - jure uxoris
- 1141-1169 - Arnoul I, Count de Guînes (son of Gisela of Guînes, daughter of Baldwin I)
- 1169-1205 - Baldwin II, Count of Guînes
- 1205-1220 - Arnold II of Guînes
- 1220-1244 - Baldwin III, Count of Guînes
- 1244-? - Arnould III, Count of Guînes
- Baldwin IV, Count of Guînes
- 1294–1302 - John II of Brienne, Count of Guînes
- 1302–1344 - Raoul I of Brienne, Count of Guînes, Constable of France.
- 1344–1350 - Raoul II of Brienne, Count of Guînes, forfeited.
  - The county was confiscated by King John II of France in 1350 and later granted to Georges de La Trémoille in 1398.
- 1398–1446 - Georges de La Trémoille
- 1446–1483 - Louis I de La Trémoille
- 1483–1525 - Louis II de la Trémoille
- 1525–1541 - François II de La Trémoille
- 1541–1577 - Louis III de La Trémoille
- 1577–1604 - Claude de La Trémoille
- 1604–1674 - Henri de La Trémoille

== Sources ==
- Lambert of Ardres (24 November 2010). The History of the Counts of Guines and Lords of Ardres. University of Pennsylvania Press. ISBN 978-0-8122-0054-6.
- Nieus, Jean-François (2010). "Les conflits familiaux et leur traitement dans l'Historia comitum Ghisnensium de Lambert d'Ardres". In Martin Aurell (ed.). La Parenté déchirée: les luttes intrafamiliales au Moyen Âge. Brepols. pp. 343–358.
