= Baldwin II of Guînes =

12th-13th century French nobleman

Baldwin II, Count of Guînes
- Arms of the Count of Guînes: Vairy or and azure.
- Born: c. 1135
- Died: 2 January 1205

Baldwin II, Count of Guînes (died 2 January 1205), was a French nobleman.

== Biography ==
Baldwin was a son of Arnoul I, Count de Guînes and Mathilde de Saint-Omer. He succeeded as Count of Guînes from 1169. He received Thomas Becket, Archbishop of Canterbury at Guînes in 1170. Thomas had knighted Baldwin previously.

In 1191, Baldwin II was required to pay homage to the King of France after the ceding of his territory by the Count of Flanders. He also held lands in England.

During a dispute with Renaud I, Count of Dammartin, he was captured whilst fighting. While Baldwin was released a little later, he died of the effects of his captivity.

== Marriage and issue ==
Baldwin married Christine d'Ardres, daughter of Arnould IV de Marcq, vicomte d'Ardres and Adeline d'Ardres, they are known to have had the following issue.

- Adeline de Guînes, married firstly Baldwin de Engoudsent and secondly Hugh de Malaunoy, had issue.
- Mabille de Guînes, married Jean de Cysoing.
- Arnold II de Guînes (died 1220), married Béatrice de Bourbourg, had issue.
- Guillaume de Guînes
- Manassés de Guînes, married Aiélis de Tiembronne.
- Baudouin de Guînes, priest in Thérouanne.
- Gillis de Guînes (died 1227), married firstly Christina de Montgardin, and secondly Adélaïde de Zeltun.
- Adeline de Guînes, married Beaudouin de Cayeux
- Marguerite de Guînes, married Radboud de Rumes
- Mathilde de Guînes, married Guillaume de Thiemnbronne.

Baldwin also is known to have had the following illegitimate children:

- Godfrey, Canon to Bruges
- Boldekin
- Eustache
- Willelkin

It is recorded that twenty three illegitimate children attended his funeral.

== Bibliography ==
- Barlow, Frank (1990). Thomas Becket. University of California Press. ISBN 9780520071759.
- Du Chesne, André (1632). Histoire généalogique des maisons de Guines, d'Ardres, de Gand et de Coucy et de quelques autres familles illustres (in French). Paris.
