= Lambert of Ardres =

Lambert of Ardres (active 1194–1203) was a chronicler in the twelfth-century Kingdom of France, from on the frontiers of the County of Flanders.

By 1194, Lambert was the parish priest of Ardres. He was related to the Counts of Guînes, for whom he wrote a Historia comitum Ghisnensium, begun around 1196 and left unfinished in 1203. It is a mixture of history and folklore. It also contains a contemporary description of a donjon. A chapter of Georges Duby's The Knight, The Lady, and the Priest is dedicated to Lambert's Historia.

Lambert's Historia has been published in a number of editions:

- Godfrey de Ménilglaise (ed.), Chronique de Guines et d'Ardres par Lambert, curé d'Ardres (Paris, 1855).
- Johannes Heller (ed.), "Lamberti ardensis historia comitum Ghisnensium", in Monumenta Germaniae Historica, Scriptores, vol. 24 (1879), 550–642.
- Leah Shopkow (trans.), The History of the Counts of Guines and Lords of Ardres (University of Pennsylvania Press, 2000)
