= Canton of Noyelles-sous-Lens =

Coordinates: 50°25′32″N 2°54′00″E

Noyelles-sous-Lens
- Former canton
- Interactive map of Noyelles-sous-Lens
- Country: France
- Region: Hauts-de-France
- Department: Pas-de-Calais
- No. of communes: {{{nbcomm}}}
- Disbanded: 2015
- Area: 10.57 km^{2} (4.08 sq mi)
- Population (2012): 21,608
  - Density: 2,044/km^{2} (5,295/sq mi)

The canton of Noyelles-sous-Lens is a former canton situated in the department of the Pas-de-Calais and in the Nord-Pas-de-Calais region of northern France. It was disbanded following the French canton reorganisation which came into effect in March 2015. It consisted of 3 communes, which joined the canton of Harnes in 2015. It had a total of 21,608 inhabitants (2012).

== Geography ==
The canton is organised around Noyelles-sous-Lens in the arrondissement of Lens. The altitude varies from 22m (Fouquières-lès-Lens) to 45m (Billy-Montigny) for an average altitude of 38m.

The canton comprised 3 communes:

- Billy-Montigny
- Fouquières-lès-Lens
- Noyelles-sous-Lens

== Population ==
Population Evolution
1962	1968	1975	1982	1990	1999
27427	28712	25371	23420	22851	22653
Census count starting from 1962 : Population without double counting

== See also ==
- Cantons of Pas-de-Calais
- Communes of Pas-de-Calais
- Arrondissements of the Pas-de-Calais department
