= Canton of Leforest =

Coordinates: 50°25′59″N 3°01′32″E

Leforest
- Former canton
- Interactive map of Leforest
- Country: France
- Region: Hauts-de-France
- Department: Pas-de-Calais
- No. of communes: {{{nbcomm}}}
- Disbanded: 2015
- Area: 26.83 km^{2} (10.36 sq mi)
- Population (2012): 23,699
  - Density: 883.3/km^{2} (2,288/sq mi)

The Canton of Leforest is a former canton situated in the department of the Pas-de-Calais and in the Nord-Pas-de-Calais region of northern France. It was disbanded following the French canton reorganisation which came into effect in March 2015. It had a total of 23,699 inhabitants (2012).

== Geography ==
The canton is organised around Leforest in the arrondissement of Lens. The altitude varies from 20 m (Courcelles-lès-Lens) to 66 m (Leforest) for an average altitude of 27 m.

The canton comprised 4 communes:

- Courcelles-lès-Lens
- Dourges
- Évin-Malmaison
- Leforest

== Population ==
Population Evolution
1962	1968	1975	1982	1990	1999
22146	24137	23711	23059	24278	23272
Census count starting from 1962 : Population without double counting

== See also ==
- Cantons of Pas-de-Calais
- Communes of Pas-de-Calais
- Arrondissements of the Pas-de-Calais department
