= Canton of Rouvroy =

Coordinates: 50°23′54″N 2°54′06″E

Rouvroy
- Former canton
- Interactive map of Rouvroy
- Country: France
- Region: Hauts-de-France
- Department: Pas-de-Calais
- No. of communes: {{{nbcomm}}}
- Disbanded: 2015
- Area: 17.35 km^{2} (6.70 sq mi)
- Population (2012): 19,419
  - Density: 1,119/km^{2} (2,899/sq mi)

The Canton of Rouvroy is a former canton situated in the department of the Pas-de-Calais and the Nord-Pas-de-Calais region of northern France. It was disbanded following the French canton reorganisation which came into effect in March 2015. By order of the prefect of the region, on October 18, 2006, the canton was attached to the arrondissement of Lens rather than that of Arras with effect from 1 January 2007. It had a total of 19,419 inhabitants (2012).

== Geography ==
The canton is organised around Rouvroy in the arrondissement of Lens. The altitude varies from 31 m (Méricourt) to 68 m (Drocourt) for an average altitude of 62 m.

The canton comprised 3 communes:

- Drocourt
- Méricourt (partly)
- Rouvroy

== See also ==
- Cantons of Pas-de-Calais
- Communes of Pas-de-Calais
- Arrondissements of the Pas-de-Calais department
