= Canton of Montigny-en-Gohelle =

Coordinates: 50°25′27″N 2°56′24″E

Montigny-en-Gohelle
- Former canton
- Interactive map of Montigny-en-Gohelle
- Country: France
- Region: Hauts-de-France
- Department: Pas-de-Calais
- No. of communes: {{{nbcomm}}}
- Disbanded: 2015
- Population (2012): 19,738

The canton of Montigny-en-Gohelle is a former canton situated in the department of the Pas-de-Calais and in the Nord-Pas-de-Calais region of northern France. It was disbanded following the French canton reorganisation which came into effect in March 2015. It consisted of 2 communes, which joined the canton of Hénin-Beaumont-1 in 2015. It had a total of 19,738 inhabitants (2012).

== Geography ==
The canton is organised around Montigny-en-Gohelle in the arrondissement of Lens. The altitude varies from 23m to 65m at Montigny-en-Gohelle for an average altitude of 37m.

The canton comprised 2 communes:

- Hénin-Beaumont (partly)
- Montigny-en-Gohelle

== See also ==
- Cantons of Pas-de-Calais
- Communes of Pas-de-Calais
- Arrondissements of the Pas-de-Calais department
