= Canton of Liévin-Sud =

Coordinates: 50°25′03″N 2°46′59″E

Liévin-Sud
- Former canton
- Interactive map of Liévin-Sud
- Country: France
- Region: Hauts-de-France
- Department: Pas-de-Calais
- No. of communes: {{{nbcomm}}}
- Disbanded: 2015
- Population (2012): 24,326

The canton of Liévin-Sud is a former canton situated in the department of the Pas-de-Calais and in the Nord-Pas-de-Calais region of northern France. It was disbanded following the French canton reorganisation which came into effect in March 2015. It had a total of 24,326 inhabitants (2012).

== Geography ==
The canton is organised around Liévin in the arrondissement of Lens. The altitude varies from 31m (Éleu-dit-Leauwette) to 106 m (Angres) for an average altitude of 55m.

The canton comprised 3 communes:

- Angres
- Éleu-dit-Leauwette
- Liévin (partly)

== See also ==
- Cantons of Pas-de-Calais
- Communes of Pas-de-Calais
- Arrondissements of the Pas-de-Calais department
