= Rouvroy, Pas-de-Calais =

Rouvroy
- Commune
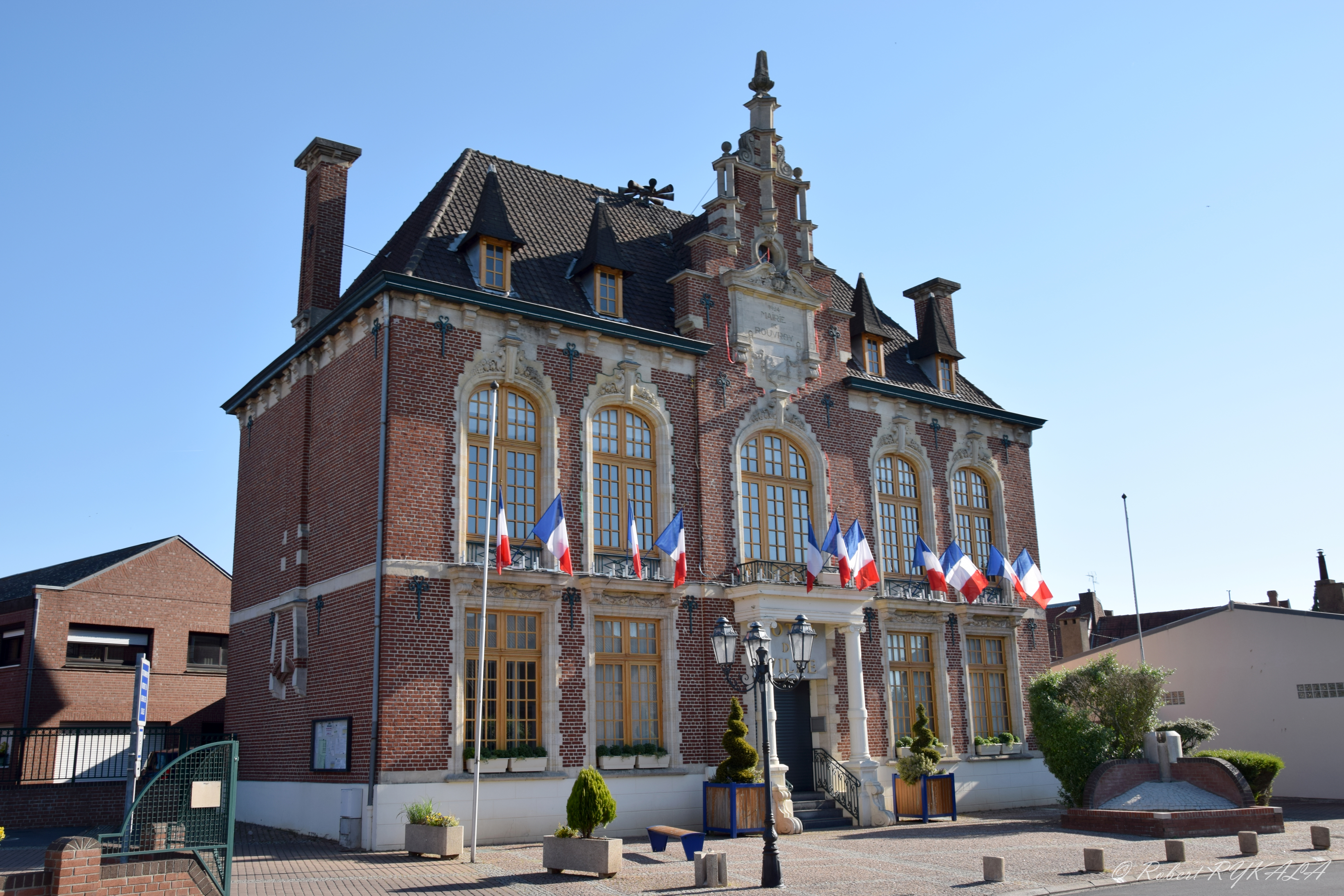
- The town hall of Rouvroy

- Coat of arms
- Location of Rouvroy
- Location within France Location within Hauts-de-France
- Coordinates: 50°23′39″N 2°54′16″E
- Country: France
- Region: Hauts-de-France
- Department: Pas-de-Calais
- Arrondissement: Lens
- Canton: Harnes
- Intercommunality: CA Hénin-Carvin

Government
  - Mayor (2020–2026): Valérie Cuvillier
- Area^{1}: 6.42 km^{2} (2.48 sq mi)
- Elevation: 55 m (180 ft)
- Highest elevation: 57 m (187 ft)
- Lowest elevation: 36 m (118 ft)
- Population (2023): 8,552
  - Density: 1,330/km^{2} (3,450/sq mi)
- Time zone: UTC+01:00 (CET)
  - Summer (DST): UTC+02:00 (CEST)
- INSEE/Postal code: 62724 /62320
- ^{1} French Land Register data, which excludes lakes, ponds, glaciers > 1 km^{2} (0.386 sq mi or 247 acres) and river estuaries.

Rouvroy (French pronunciation: [ʁuvʁwa]) is a commune in the Pas-de-Calais department in the Hauts-de-France region of France.

== Geography ==
Rouvroy is a farming and light industrial town, 6 miles (9.7 km) southeast of Lens, at the junction of the D40 and the D46 roads.

== Population ==
The inhabitants are called Rouvroysiens in French.

Historical population
Year	Pop.	±% p.a.
1968	9,780	—
1975	9,262	−0.77%
1982	9,608	+0.53%
1990	9,208	−0.53%
1999	9,077	−0.16%
2007	8,905	−0.24%
2012	8,617	−0.66%
2017	8,738	+0.28%
2023	8,552	−0.36%
Source: INSEE

== Places of interest ==
- The modern church of Saint-Géry-et-Saint-Louis, built to replace the original that was destroyed, along with most of the commune, during World War I.

== Nearest communes ==
- Méricourt, west
- Billy-Montigny, north
- Hénin-Beaumont, northeast
- Drocourt, east
- Bois-Bernard, southeast
- Acheville, southwest

== See also ==
- Communes of the Pas-de-Calais department
