= Canton of Lens-Est =

Coordinates: 50°25′35″N 2°50′55″E

Lens-Est
- Former canton
- Interactive map of Lens-Est
- Country: France
- Region: Hauts-de-France
- Department: Pas-de-Calais
- No. of communes: {{{nbcomm}}}
- Disbanded: 2015
- Population (2012): 20,023

The canton of Lens-Est is a former canton situated in the department of the Pas-de-Calais and in the Nord-Pas-de-Calais region of northern France. It was disbanded following the French canton reorganisation which came into effect in March 2015. It had a total of 20,023 inhabitants (2012).

== Geography ==
The canton is organised around Lens in the arrondissement of Lens. The altitude varies from 27m to 71m (Lens) for an average altitude of 29m.

The canton comprised 2 communes:

- Lens (partly)
- Sallaumines

== See also ==
- Cantons of Pas-de-Calais
- Communes of Pas-de-Calais
- Arrondissements of the Pas-de-Calais department
