= Canton of Hénin-Beaumont =

Coordinates: 50°25′10″N 2°58′20″E

Hénin-Beaumont
- Former canton
- Interactive map of Hénin-Beaumont
- Country: France
- Region: Hauts-de-France
- Department: Pas-de-Calais
- No. of communes: {{{nbcomm}}}
- Disbanded: 2015
- Population (2012): 22,187

The Canton of Hénin-Beaumont is a former canton situated in the department of the Pas-de-Calais and in the Nord-Pas-de-Calais region of northern France. It was disbanded following the French canton reorganisation which came into effect in March 2015. It had a total of 22,187 inhabitants (2012).

== Geography ==
The canton is organised around Hénin-Beaumont in the arrondissement of Lens. The altitude varies from 22m (Noyelles-Godault) to 65m (Hénin-Beaumont) for an average altitude of 32m.

The canton comprised 2 communes:

- Hénin-Beaumont (partly)
- Noyelles-Godault

== See also ==
- Cantons of Pas-de-Calais
- Communes of Pas-de-Calais
- Arrondissements of the Pas-de-Calais department
