= Canton of Courrières =

Coordinates: 50°27′45″N 2°58′03″E

Courrières
- Former canton
- Interactive map of Courrières
- Country: France
- Region: Hauts-de-France
- Department: Pas-de-Calais
- No. of communes: {{{nbcomm}}}
- Disbanded: 2015
- Area: 14.15 km^{2} (5.46 sq mi)
- Population (2012): 20,301
  - Density: 1,435/km^{2} (3,716/sq mi)

The canton of Courrières is a former canton situated in the department of the Pas-de-Calais and in the Nord-Pas-de-Calais region of northern France. It was disbanded following the French canton reorganisation which came into effect in March 2015. It had a total of 20,301 inhabitants (2012).

== Geography ==
The canton was organised around Courrières in the arrondissement of Lens. The altitude varies from 22m to 38m (Courrières) for an average altitude of 26m.

The canton comprised 2 communes:

- Courrières
- Oignies

== Population ==
Population Evolution
1962	1968	1975	1982	1990	1999
19078	21859	24140	23158	22036	21119
Census count starting from 1962 : Population without double counting

== See also ==
- Cantons of Pas-de-Calais
- Communes of Pas-de-Calais
- Arrondissements of the Pas-de-Calais department
