= Sallaumines =

- Commune
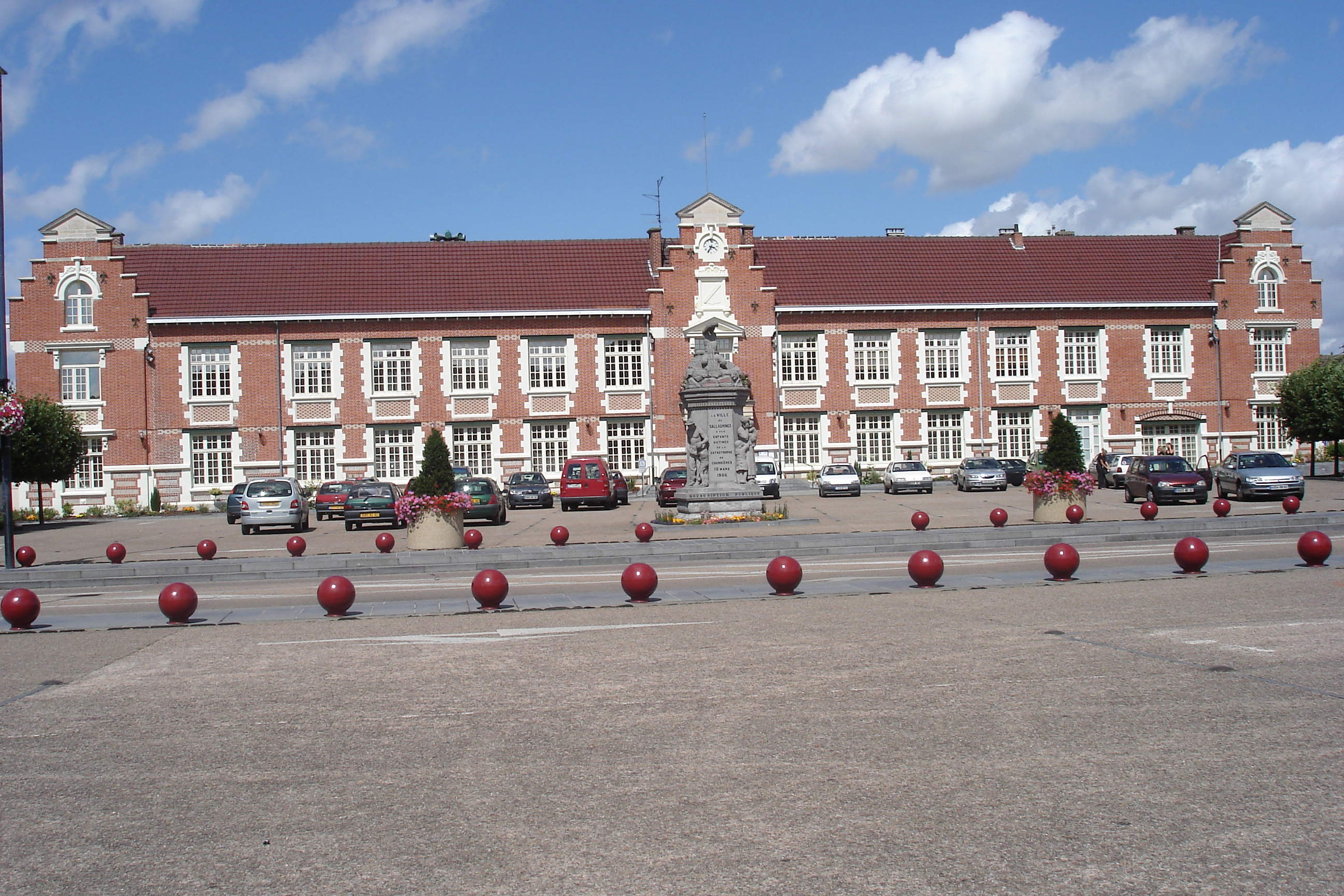
- Town hall of Sallaumines

- Coat of arms
- Location of Sallaumines
- Location within France Location within Hauts-de-France
- Coordinates: 50°25′13″N 2°51′47″E
- Country: France
- Region: Hauts-de-France
- Department: Pas-de-Calais
- Arrondissement: Lens
- Canton: Avion
- Intercommunality: CA Lens-Liévin

Government
  - Mayor (2020–2026): Christian Pedowski
- Area^{1}: 3.82 km^{2} (1.47 sq mi)
- Elevation: 43 m (141 ft)
- Highest elevation: 54 m (177 ft)
- Lowest elevation: 27 m (89 ft)
- Population (2023): 9,414
  - Density: 2,460/km^{2} (6,380/sq mi)
- Time zone: UTC+01:00 (CET)
  - Summer (DST): UTC+02:00 (CEST)
- INSEE/Postal code: 62771 /62430
- ^{1} French Land Register data, which excludes lakes, ponds, glaciers > 1 km^{2} (0.386 sq mi or 247 acres) and river estuaries.

Sallaumines (French pronunciation: [salomin]; Picard: Sallaumine or Sallau) is a commune in the Pas-de-Calais department of northern France.

== Administration ==
Sallaumines belongs to the Lens-Liévin intercommunality which consists of 36 communes, with a total population of 250,000 inhabitants.

== History ==
The history of the area remains marked by the Courrières mine disaster which caused 1099 deaths on 10 March 1906 on the territories of Billy-Montigny, Méricourt and Sallaumines.

On 18 June 1916 Max Immelmann, the first German World War I flying ace, was killed by the British 25 Squadron Royal Flying Corps while flying over the area.

It was in the town of Montigny-en-Gohelle, in the Pas-de-Calais region, at pit number 7 of the Dourges Mining Company, that the strike began, led by Émilienne Mopty and Michel Brulé (1912-1942), depriving the Germans of 93,000 tons of coal for nearly two weeks. This was one of the first acts of collective resistance to the Nazi occupation in France and the largest in terms of numbers, resulting in 414 arrests in three waves, the deportation of 270 people, and the execution of 130 miners at the Citadel of Arras. After the war, the town was also at the center of three national events: the Battle for Coal (1945-1947), followed by the miners' strikes of 1947 and 1948.

== Population ==
Historical population
Year	Pop.	±% p.a.
1968	14,768	—
1975	12,971	−1.84%
1982	12,081	−1.01%
1990	11,036	−1.12%
1999	10,677	−0.37%
2007	10,466	−0.25%
2012	9,621	−1.67%
2017	9,715	+0.19%
2023	9,414	−0.52%
Source: INSEE

== Geography ==
Its nearby communes are Méricourt to the southeast, Avion to the southwest, Lens to the west, Loison-sous-Lens to the north, Harnes to the northeast and Montigny-en-Gohelle to the east.

== Transportation ==
The A21 motorway passes north of the town. Sallaumines has a train station (Gare de Sallaumines) on the line from Lens to Lille, and another one (Gare de Pont-de-Sallaumines) on the line from Lens to Valenciennes.

== Twin towns and sister cities ==
Sallaumines is twinned with:

- Lugau, Germany
- Torez, Ukraine
- Trbovlje, Slovenia
- Wodzisław Śląski, Poland

== See also ==
- Communes of the Pas-de-Calais department
