= Canton of Liévin-Nord =

Coordinates: 50°26′13″N 2°45′57″E

Liévin-Nord
- Former canton
- Interactive map of Liévin-Nord
- Country: France
- Region: Hauts-de-France
- Department: Pas-de-Calais
- No. of communes: {{{nbcomm}}}
- Disbanded: 2015
- Population (2012): 21,045

The canton of Liévin-Nord is a former canton situated in the department of the Pas-de-Calais and in the Nord-Pas-de-Calais region of northern France. It was disbanded following the French canton reorganisation which came into effect in March 2015. It had a total of 21,045 inhabitants (2012).

== Geography ==
The canton is organised around Liévin in the arrondissement of Lens. The altitude varies from 32m (Liévin) to 80m (Grenay) for an average altitude of 57m.

The canton comprised 2 communes:

- Grenay
- Liévin (partly)

== See also ==
- Cantons of Pas-de-Calais
- Communes of Pas-de-Calais
- Arrondissements of the Pas-de-Calais department
