= Arrondissement of Lens =

Coordinates: 50.43°N 2.83°E

Lens
- Arrondissement
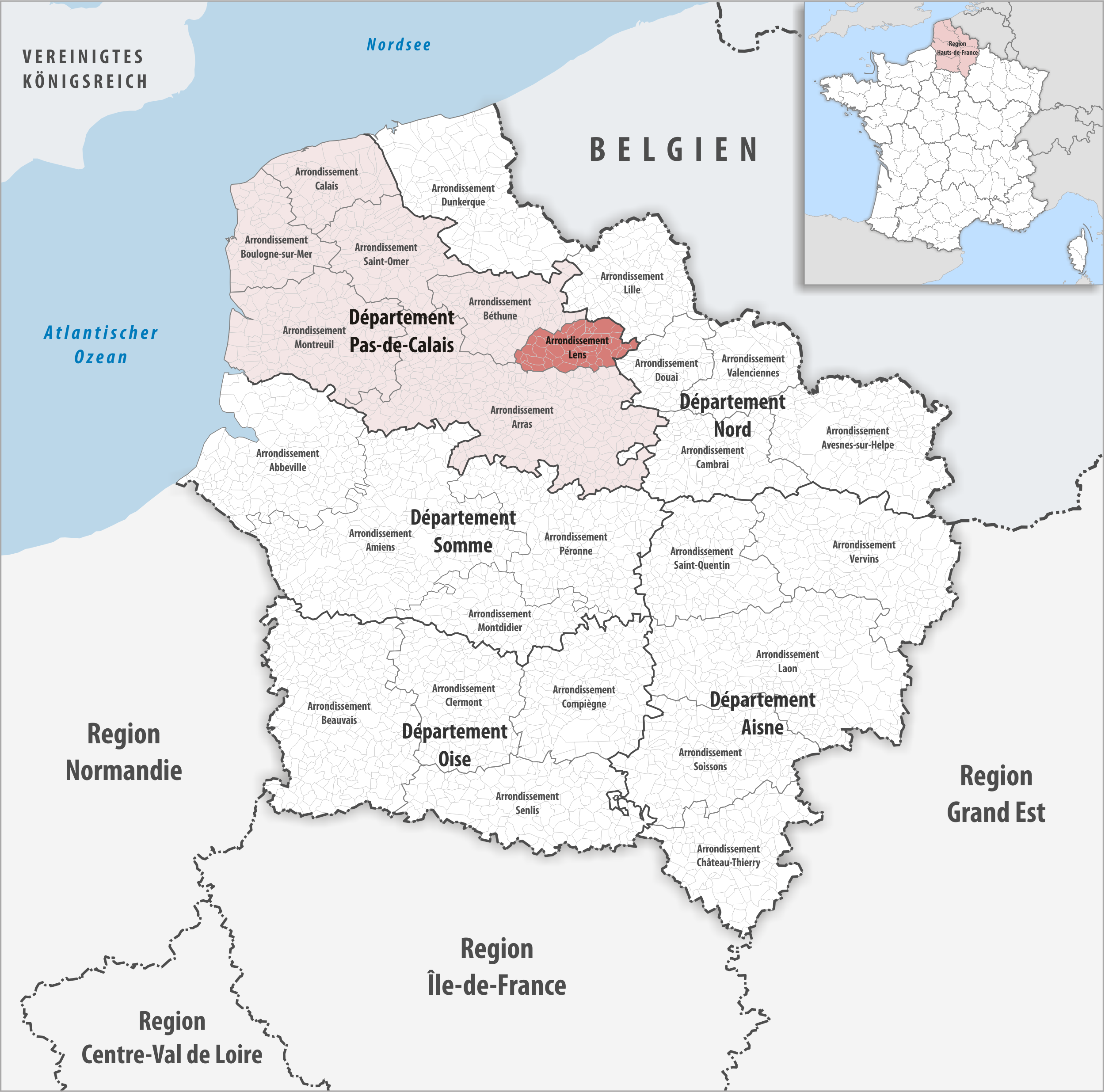
- Location within the region Hauts-de-France
- Country: France
- Region: Hauts-de-France
- Department: Pas-de-Calais
- No. of communes: {{{nbcomm}}}
- Area: 351.5 km^{2} (135.7 sq mi)
- Population (2023): 367,806
  - Density: 1,046/km^{2} (2,710/sq mi)
- INSEE code: 627

The arrondissement of Lens is an arrondissement of northern France in the Pas-de-Calais department in the Hauts-de-France region. It has 50 communes. Its population is 369,427 (2021), and its area is 351.5 km^{2} (135.7 sq mi).

== Composition ==
The communes of the arrondissement of Lens, and their INSEE codes, are:

1. Ablain-Saint-Nazaire (62001)
2. Acheville (62003)
3. Aix-Noulette (62019)
4. Angres (62032)
5. Annay (62033)
6. Avion (62065)
7. Bénifontaine (62107)
8. Billy-Montigny (62133)
9. Bois-Bernard (62148)
10. Bouvigny-Boyeffles (62170)
11. Bully-les-Mines (62186)
12. Carency (62213)
13. Carvin (62215)
14. Courcelles-lès-Lens (62249)
15. Courrières (62250)
16. Dourges (62274)
17. Drocourt (62277)
18. Éleu-dit-Leauwette (62291)
19. Estevelles (62311)
20. Évin-Malmaison (62321)
21. Fouquières-lès-Lens (62351)
22. Givenchy-en-Gohelle (62371)
23. Gouy-Servins (62380)
24. Grenay (62386)
25. Harnes (62413)
26. Hénin-Beaumont (62427)
27. Hulluch (62464)
28. Leforest (62497)
29. Lens (62498)
30. Libercourt (62907)
31. Liévin (62510)
32. Loison-sous-Lens (62523)
33. Loos-en-Gohelle (62528)
34. Mazingarbe (62563)
35. Méricourt (62570)
36. Meurchin (62573)
37. Montigny-en-Gohelle (62587)
38. Noyelles-Godault (62624)
39. Noyelles-sous-Lens (62628)
40. Oignies (62637)
41. Pont-à-Vendin (62666)
42. Rouvroy (62724)
43. Sains-en-Gohelle (62737)
44. Sallaumines (62771)
45. Servins (62793)
46. Souchez (62801)
47. Vendin-le-Vieil (62842)
48. Villers-au-Bois (62854)
49. Vimy (62861)
50. Wingles (62895)

== History ==
The arrondissement of Lens was created in 1962 from part of the arrondissement of Béthune. In January 2007 it absorbed the two cantons of Avion and Rouvroy from the arrondissement of Arras. At the January 2017 reorganisation of the arrondissements of Pas-de-Calais, it gained eight communes from the arrondissement of Arras, and it lost one commune to the arrondissement of Béthune.

As a result of the reorganisation of the cantons of France which came into effect in 2015, the borders of the cantons are no longer related to the borders of the arrondissements. The cantons of the arrondissement of Lens were, as of January 2015:

1. Avion
2. Bully-les-Mines
3. Carvin
4. Courrières
5. Harnes
6. Hénin-Beaumont
7. Leforest
8. Lens-Est
9. Lens-Nord-Est
10. Lens-Nord-Ouest
11. Liévin-Nord
12. Liévin-Sud
13. Montigny-en-Gohelle
14. Noyelles-sous-Lens
15. Rouvroy
16. Sains-en-Gohelle
17. Wingles
