= Communauté d'agglomération d'Hénin-Carvin =

Coordinates: 50.42°N 2.95°E

Hénin-Carvin
- Communauté d'agglomération
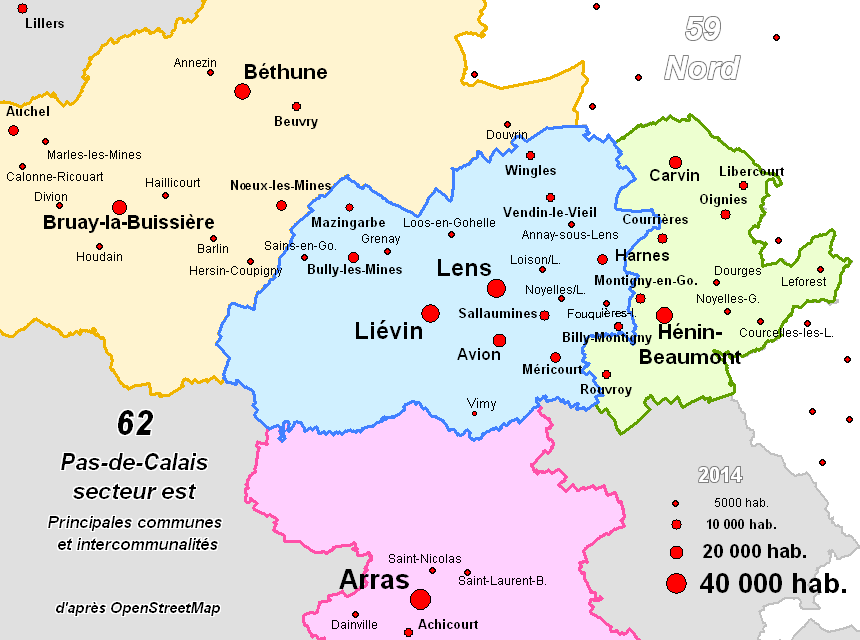
- Country: France
- Region: Hauts-de-France
- Department: Pas-de-Calais
- No. of communes: {{{nbcomm}}}
- Established: 2001

Government
  - President: Christophe Pilch
- Area: 112.06 km^{2} (43.27 sq mi)
- Population (2018): 126,509
  - Density: 1,128.9/km^{2} (2,923.9/sq mi)
- Website: www.agglo-henincarvin.fr

The Communauté d'agglomération of Hénin-Carvin is the communauté d'agglomération, an intercommunal structure, centred on the cities of Hénin-Beaumont and Carvin. It is located in the Pas-de-Calais department, in the Hauts-de-France region, northern France. It was created on 1 January 2001. Its seat is Hénin-Beaumont. Its area is 112.1 km^{2}. Its population was 126,509 in 2018, of which 25,917 in Hénin-Beaumont.

== Composition ==
The communauté d'agglomération consists of the following 14 communes:

1. Bois-Bernard
2. Carvin
3. Courcelles-lès-Lens
4. Courrières
5. Dourges
6. Drocourt
7. Évin-Malmaison
8. Hénin-Beaumont
9. Leforest
10. Libercourt
11. Montigny-en-Gohelle
12. Noyelles-Godault
13. Oignies
14. Rouvroy
