= Harnes =

- Commune
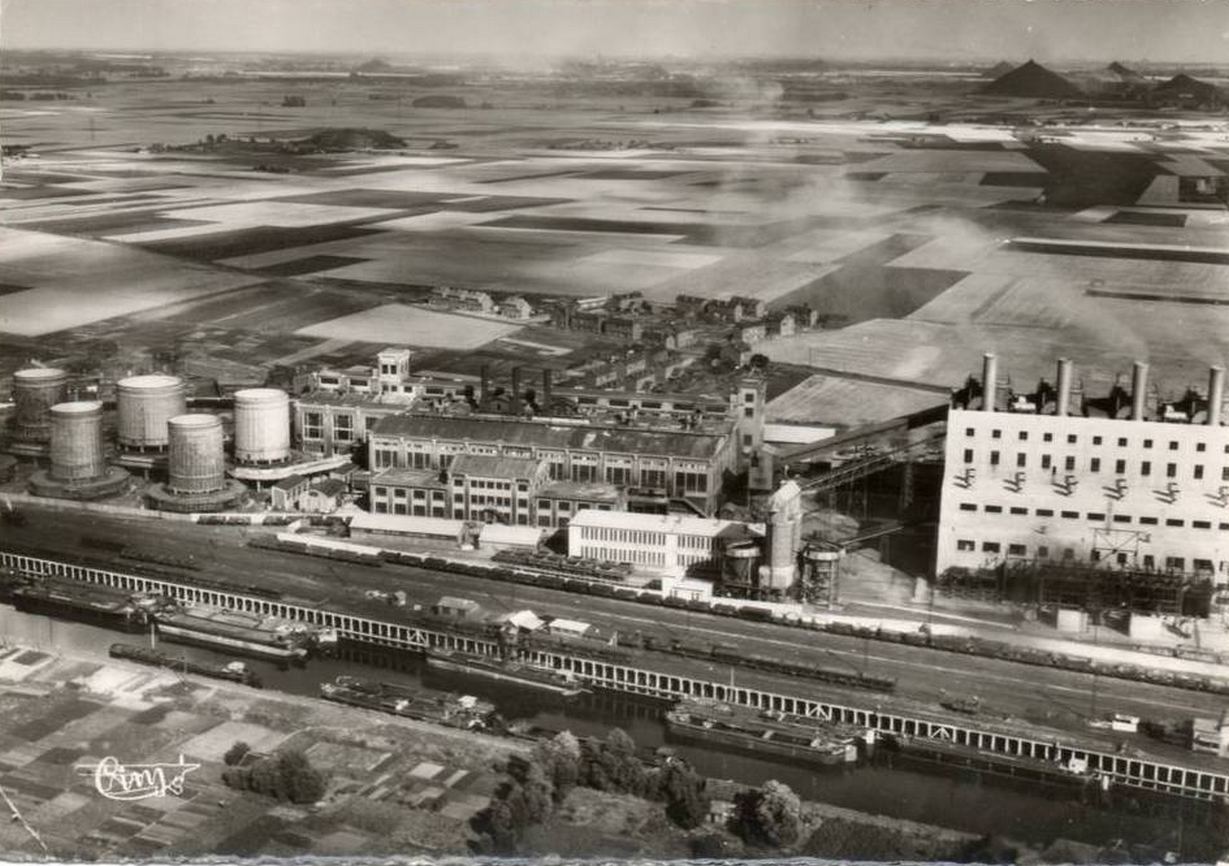
- An aerial view in 1920

- Coat of arms
- Location of Harnes
- Location within France Location within Hauts-de-France
- Coordinates: 50°26′45″N 2°54′24″E
- Country: France
- Region: Hauts-de-France
- Department: Pas-de-Calais
- Arrondissement: Lens
- Canton: Harnes
- Intercommunality: CA Lens-Liévin

Government
  - Mayor (2020–2026): Philippe Duquesnoy
- Area^{1}: 10.76 km^{2} (4.15 sq mi)
- Elevation: 32 m (105 ft)
- Highest elevation: 44 m (144 ft)
- Lowest elevation: 20 m (66 ft)
- Population (2023): 12,247
  - Density: 1,138/km^{2} (2,948/sq mi)
- Time zone: UTC+01:00 (CET)
  - Summer (DST): UTC+02:00 (CEST)
- INSEE/Postal code: 62413 /62440
- ^{1} French Land Register data, which excludes lakes, ponds, glaciers > 1 km^{2} (0.386 sq mi or 247 acres) and river estuaries.

Harnes (French pronunciation: [aʁn]) is a commune in the Pas-de-Calais department in the Hauts-de-France region of France.

== Geography ==
Harnes is an ex-coalmining and light industrial town situated some 4 miles (6.4 km) northeast of Lens, at the junction of the D162e and the D39. The Lens canal forms much of the southern border of the town and the A21 autoroute passes by a few yards from the canal.

== History ==
First recorded as Hamas, the town was known as Harnis until, in the 12th century, when its present spelling was used. It’s possible that the name comes from the Flemish "Hearn" meaning “Marsh”.

The town was settled during the Gallo-Roman period, as archaeological finds have proved. In the municipal museum of Harnes, one can see the "treasure of Harnes": Coins, building materials, urns, vases, spears, iron objects and bones as well as some Samian ware (red glazed pottery) decorated with eagles, lions, sphinxes etc.

In 1304, Harnes was looted and burned by the Flemish. Under the Counts of Burgundy, from 1384 to 1482, civil and foreign wars were waged. Fighting, famine, plague and epidemics badly affected the people and prosperity of the region.

In 1438, Harnes was recorded with "31 fires (homes) and 109 inhabitants". The village was so poor that it was exempted from paying taxes.

In 1493, during the reign of Philip the Fair, the Austrians attacked France. They made camp at Harnes and then destroyed the castle.

On 2 November 1789 the National Assembly voted through the law of nationalization of all religious property. The people of Harnes were able to buy all the land that once belonged to the monastery, part of the abbey of St. Pierre at Ghent.

== Population ==
Historical population
Year	Pop.	±% p.a.
1968	14,622	—
1975	13,845	−0.78%
1982	13,996	+0.16%
1990	14,309	+0.28%
1999	13,700	−0.48%
2007	12,922	−0.73%
2012	12,220	−1.11%
2017	12,354	+0.22%
2023	12,247	−0.14%
Source: INSEE

== Eco water treatment system ==
In the old riverbed of the Deûle/Souchez river (long-since drained by the creation of the Lens canal) and on the former mining area, the local authorities have created a landscape whose objective is to supplement the wastewater treatment leaving the sewage treatment plant at Fouquières by biological methods to eliminate pathogens and phosphates. Five successive treatments are employed, involving filtration by coppiced willow, tanks planted with reeds, iris, bulrush etc., oxygenation and exposure to sunlight. The energy needed for pumping the water provided by four wind turbines. It takes about one month for the impure water to pass through the cleaning course, before joining the Lens canal.

This project, which took five years to build (1999–2004), was awarded the “Rosa Barba” at the fourth biennial European landscape congress in Barcelona. .

== Main sights ==
- The mining museum
- The archaeology and history museum
- Florimond woods
- The “Pont Maudit”, a bridge dating from the 18th century
- The church of St.Martin, dating from the 20th century
- The war memorial

== Twin towns and sister cities ==
- Loanhead, Scotland, United Kingdom
- Chrzanów, Poland
- Falkenstein, Germany
- Kabouda, Burkina Faso
- Vendres, France

== See also ==
- Communes of the Pas-de-Calais department
