= Courrières mine disaster =

1906 coal mine explosion in Pas-de-Calais, France

Coordinates: 50.4154°N 2.8900°E

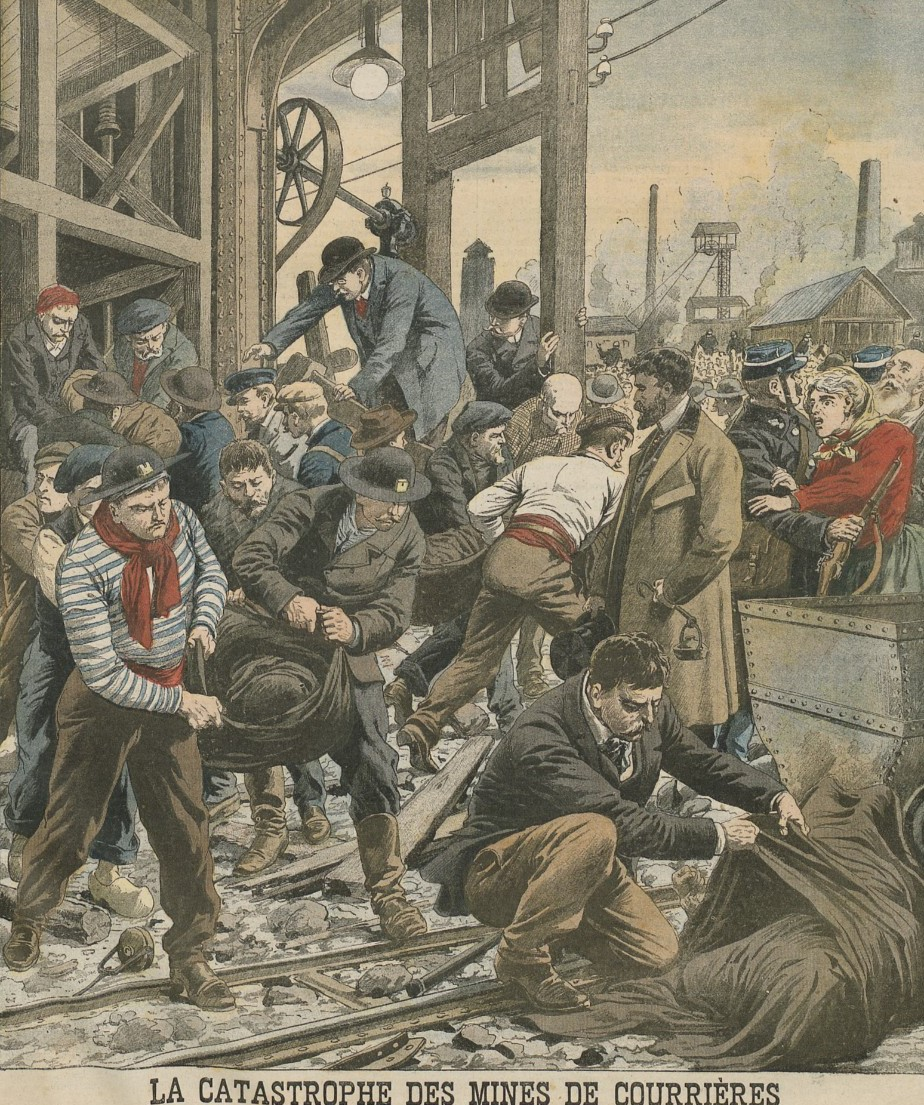
Le Petit Journal illustration of the Courrières mine disaster

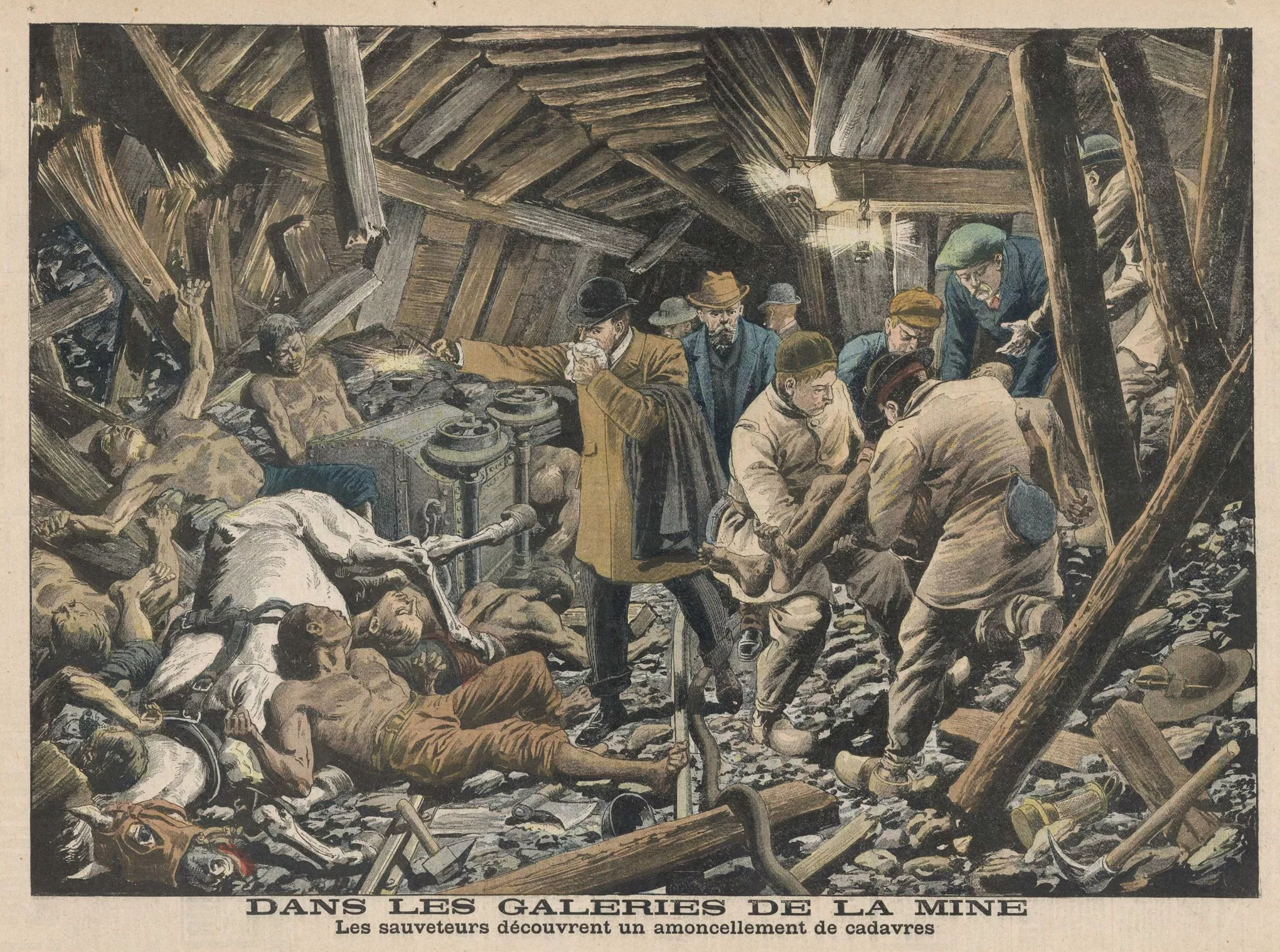
Courrieres Mine disaster

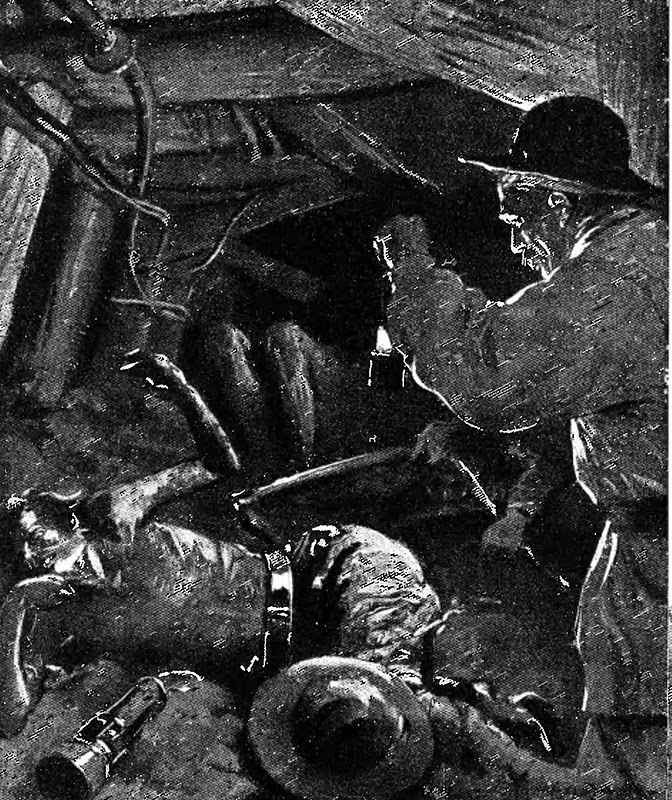
Niva illustration

The Courrières mine disaster, Europe's worst mining accident, caused the death of 1,099 miners in Northern France on 10 March 1906. This disaster was surpassed only by the Benxihu Colliery accident in China on 26 April 1942, which killed 1,549 miners. A coal-dust explosion, the cause of which is not known with certainty, devastated a coal mine operated by the Compagnie des mines de houille de Courrières. Victims lived nearby in the villages of Méricourt (404 people killed), Sallaumines (304 killed), Billy-Montigny (114 people killed), and Noyelles-sous-Lens (102 people killed). The mine was 2 km (1 mi) to the east of Lens, in the Pas-de-Calais département (about 220 km, or 140 miles, north of Paris).

A large explosion was heard shortly after 06:30 on the morning of Saturday 10 March 1906. An elevator cage at Shaft 3 was thrown to the surface, damaging the pit-head; windows and roofs were blown out on the surface at Shaft 4; an elevator cage raised at Shaft 2 contained only dead or unconscious miners.

== Initial cause ==
It is generally agreed that the majority of the deaths and destruction were caused by an explosion of coal dust which swept through the mine. However it has never been ascertained what caused the initial ignition of the coal dust. Two main causes have been hypothesized:

- An accident during the handling of mining explosives.
- Ignition of methane by the naked flame of a miner's lamp.

There is evidence favoring both these hypotheses. Blasting was being done in the area believed to be the source of the explosion, after initial attempts to widen a gallery had been abandoned the previous day for lack of success. Many workers in the mine used lamps with naked flames (as opposed to the more expensive Davy lamps), despite the risk of gas explosions. As Monsieur Delafond, General Inspector of Mines, put it in his report:

The primary cause of the Courrières catastrophe could not be determined with absolute certainty. This is what generally happens in catastrophes where all the witnesses to the accident are gone.

== Rescue attempts ==
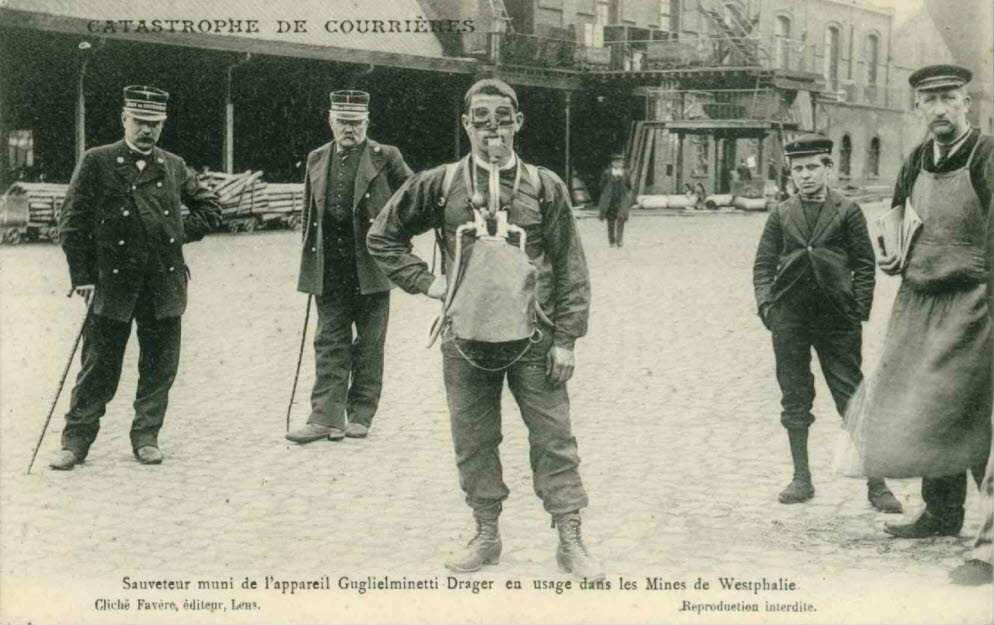
Courrières mine disaster - Rescuer equipped with Guglielminetti-Drager breathing apparatus (front)

Rescue attempts began quickly on the morning of the disaster, but were hampered by the lack of trained mine rescuers in France at that time, and by the scale of the disaster: some two-thirds of the miners in the mine at the time of the explosion perished, while many survivors suffered from the effects of gas inhalation. Expert teams from Paris and from Germany arrived at the scene on 12 March. The first funerals occurred on 13 March, during an unseasonal snowstorm; 15,000 people attended. The funerals were a focus for the anger of the mining communities against the companies which owned the concessions; the first strikes started the next day in the Courrières area, extending quickly to other areas in the départements of the Pas-de-Calais and the Nord.

The slow progress of the rescue exacerbated the tensions between the mining communities and the companies. By 1 April only 194 bodies had been brought to the surface. There were many accusations that the Compagnie des mines de Courrières was deliberately delaying the reopening of blocked shafts to prevent coalface fires (and hence to save the coal seams): more recent studies tend to consider such claims as exaggerated. The mine was unusually complex for its time, with the different pitheads being interconnected by underground galleries on multiple levels. Such complexity was intended to facilitate access for rescuers in the case of an accident—it also helped the coal to be brought to the surface—but it contributed to the large loss of life by allowing the dust explosion to travel further and then by increasing the debris which had to be cleared by the rescuers. About 110 km (70 mi) of tunnel are believed to have been affected by the explosion. Gérard Dumont of the Centre historique minier de Lewarde has shown that the plans of the mine existing at the time of the accident were difficult to interpret: some measured the depth of galleries by reference to the minehead, others by reference to sea level.

== Survivors ==
About 500 miners were able to reach the surface in the hours immediately after the explosion. Many were severely burned and suffering the effects of mine gases.

A group of 13 survivors, known later as the rescapés, was found by rescuers on 30 March, 20 days after the explosion. They had survived at first by eating bark from the crossbeams, later by eating a rotting mine horse. They avoided dehydration by drinking the water dripping from the walls. The two eldest (39 and 40 years old) were awarded the Légion d'honneur and the other eleven (including three younger than 18 years of age) received the Médaille d'or du courage. A final survivor was found on 4 April.

== Public response ==
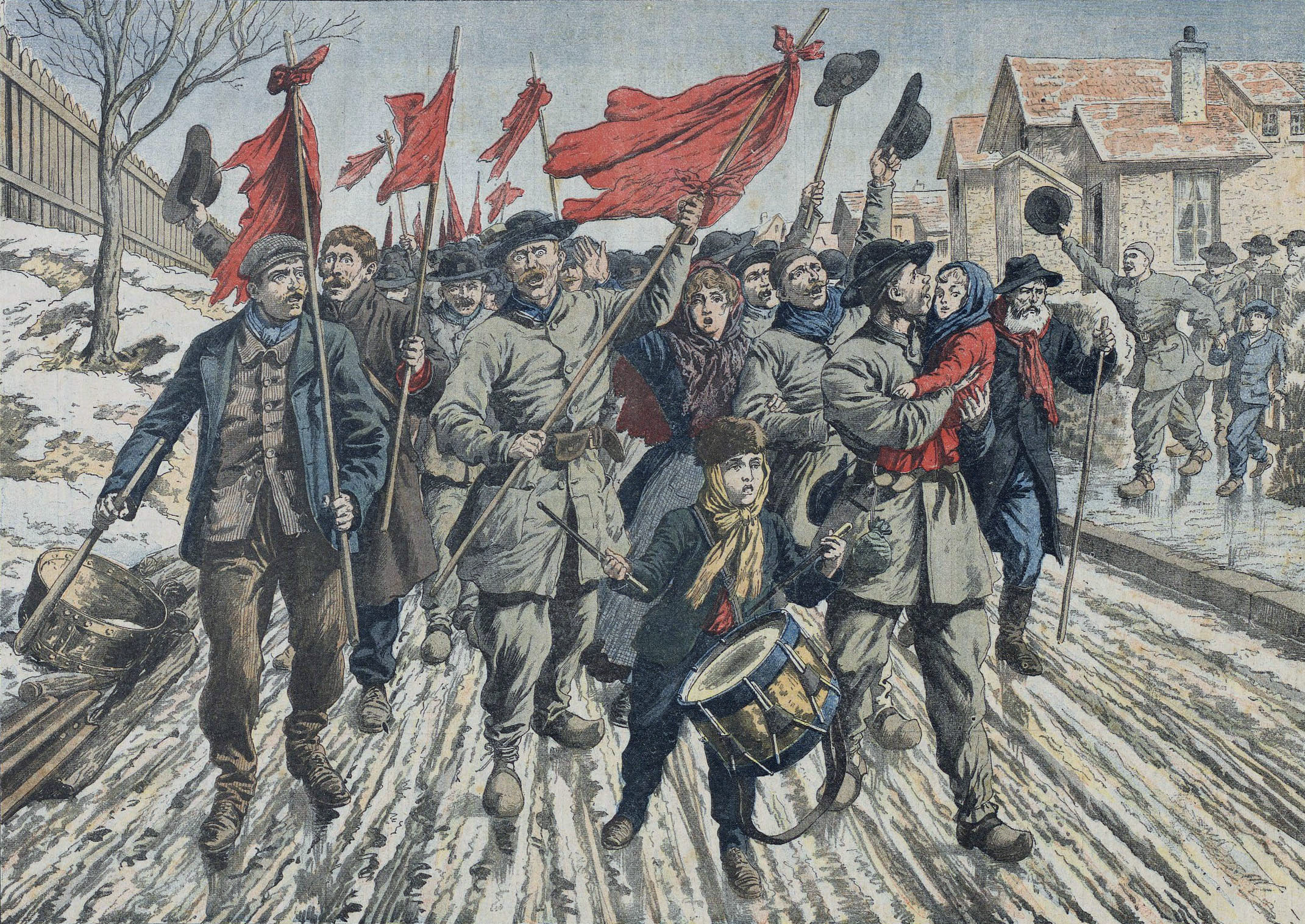
Miners' strike in Pas de Calais, 1906

The disaster at the Courrières mine was one of the first in France to be reported on a large scale by the media of the day. The Law on the Freedom of the Press of 29 July 1881 had specified the basis for a (relative) freedom of the press, and Lille, the regional capital less than 40 km (25 mi) away, had at least five daily newspapers whose reporters engaged in a fierce competition for news from the mine. Photographs could not then be published in newspapers for technical reasons, but were widely distributed as postcards; on average, each French resident sent fifteen postcards during 1906. A postcard of the thirteen rescapés was available nine days after their discovery.

The first public appeal for funds to help the victims and their families was established the day after the explosion by Le Réveil du Nord, a Lille daily newspaper. In the newspaper L'Humanité of the next day, socialist and pacifist politician Jean Jaurès wrote:

It is a call for social justice that comes to the nation's representatives from the depths of the burning mines. It is the harsh and suffering destiny of work that, once more, manifests itself to all. And would political action be something else than the sad game of ambitions and vanities if it didn't propose to itself the liberation of the workers' people, the organisation of a better life for those who work?

Such appeals became widespread, and were supplemented by the sale of special collections of postcards depicting the disaster. The different appeals were eventually subsumed by an official fund—itself established by a law enacted only four days after the explosion—and a total of 750,000 francs was raised. This at a time when the daily wage for a miner (a well-paid job compared to other manual work) was less than six francs. Over half the total was contributed by the Compagnie des mines de houille de Courrières, which operated the mine, and by the Comité central des houillières de France (Central Committee of French Coal Mines, an employers' association).

On 18 March, a strike was publicized and quickly extended itself to the entire region. Minister of Interior Georges Clemenceau visited the region twice, but "no promises were kept", according to L'Humanité. Clemenceau's first visit was filled with optimism and ex-president Jean Casimir-Perier stated that "I have the strongest hope that our discussion... will lead to an understanding which is desirable for all." However, the following day the strikers rejected the concessions offered by the mining companies and the number of strikers reached 46,000.

== See also ==
- Kameradschaft, a 1931 dramatic film by G. W. Pabst, based on the disaster
- Fraternity, a 2016 brass band contest piece by Thierry Deleruyelle, based on the disaster
- Mining in France
- Polish immigration to the Nord-Pas-de-Calais coalfield
