= Communauté d'agglomération de Lens – Liévin =

Coordinates: 50°25′N 2°48′E

Lens – Liévin
- Communauté d'agglomération
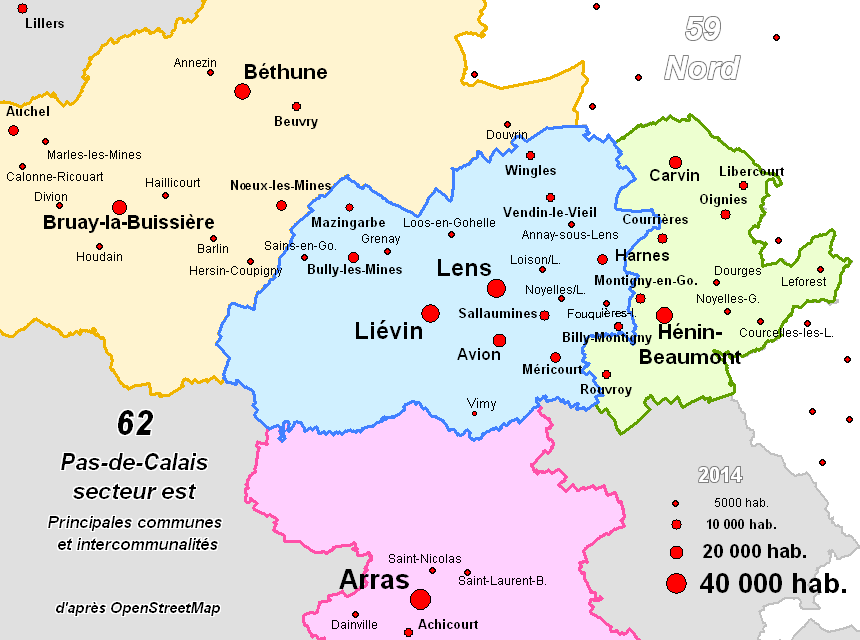
- Location within the Pas de Calais department (blue)
- Country: France
- Region: Hauts-de-France
- Department: Pas-de-Calais
- No. of communes: {{{nbcomm}}}
- Established: 2000
- Area: 239.4 km^{2} (92.4 sq mi)
- Population (2018): 241,703
  - Density: 1,010/km^{2} (2,615/sq mi)
- Website: www.agglo-lenslievin.fr

The Communauté d'agglomération de Lens – Liévin is the communauté d'agglomération, an intercommunal structure, centred on the cities of Lens and Liévin. It is located in the Pas-de-Calais department, in the Hauts-de-France region, northern France. It was created in January 2000. It adopted the name Communaupole on June 25, 2004. Its area is 239.4 km^{2}. Its population was 241,703 in 2018, of which 31,606 in Lens and 30,423 in Liévin.

== Composition ==
The Communauté d'agglomération de Lens – Liévin consists of the following 36 communes:

1. Ablain-Saint-Nazaire
2. Acheville
3. Aix-Noulette
4. Angres
5. Annay
6. Avion
7. Bénifontaine
8. Billy-Montigny
9. Bouvigny-Boyeffles
10. Bully-les-Mines
11. Carency
12. Éleu-dit-Leauwette
13. Estevelles
14. Fouquières-lès-Lens
15. Givenchy-en-Gohelle
16. Gouy-Servins
17. Grenay
18. Harnes
19. Hulluch
20. Lens
21. Liévin
22. Loison-sous-Lens
23. Loos-en-Gohelle
24. Mazingarbe
25. Méricourt
26. Meurchin
27. Noyelles-sous-Lens
28. Pont-à-Vendin
29. Sains-en-Gohelle
30. Sallaumines
31. Servins
32. Souchez
33. Vendin-le-Vieil
34. Villers-au-Bois
35. Vimy
36. Wingles
