= Canton of Hénin-Beaumont-2 =

Coordinates: 50.41°N 2.96°E

The canton of Hénin-Beaumont-2 is an administrative division of the Pas-de-Calais department, in northern France. It was created during the French canton reorganisation which came into effect in March 2015. Its seat is in Hénin-Beaumont.

It consists of the following communes:

1. Courcelles-lès-Lens
2. Drocourt
3. Évin-Malmaison
4. Hénin-Beaumont (partly)
5. Leforest
6. Noyelles-Godault
