= Canton of Liévin =

Coordinates: 50.42°N 2.78°E

The canton of Liévin is an administrative division of the Pas-de-Calais department, in northern France. It was created at the French canton reorganisation which came into effect in March 2015. Its seat is in Liévin.

It consists of the following communes:

1. Éleu-dit-Leauwette
2. Givenchy-en-Gohelle
3. Liévin
4. Vimy
