= Courcelles-lès-Lens =

- Commune
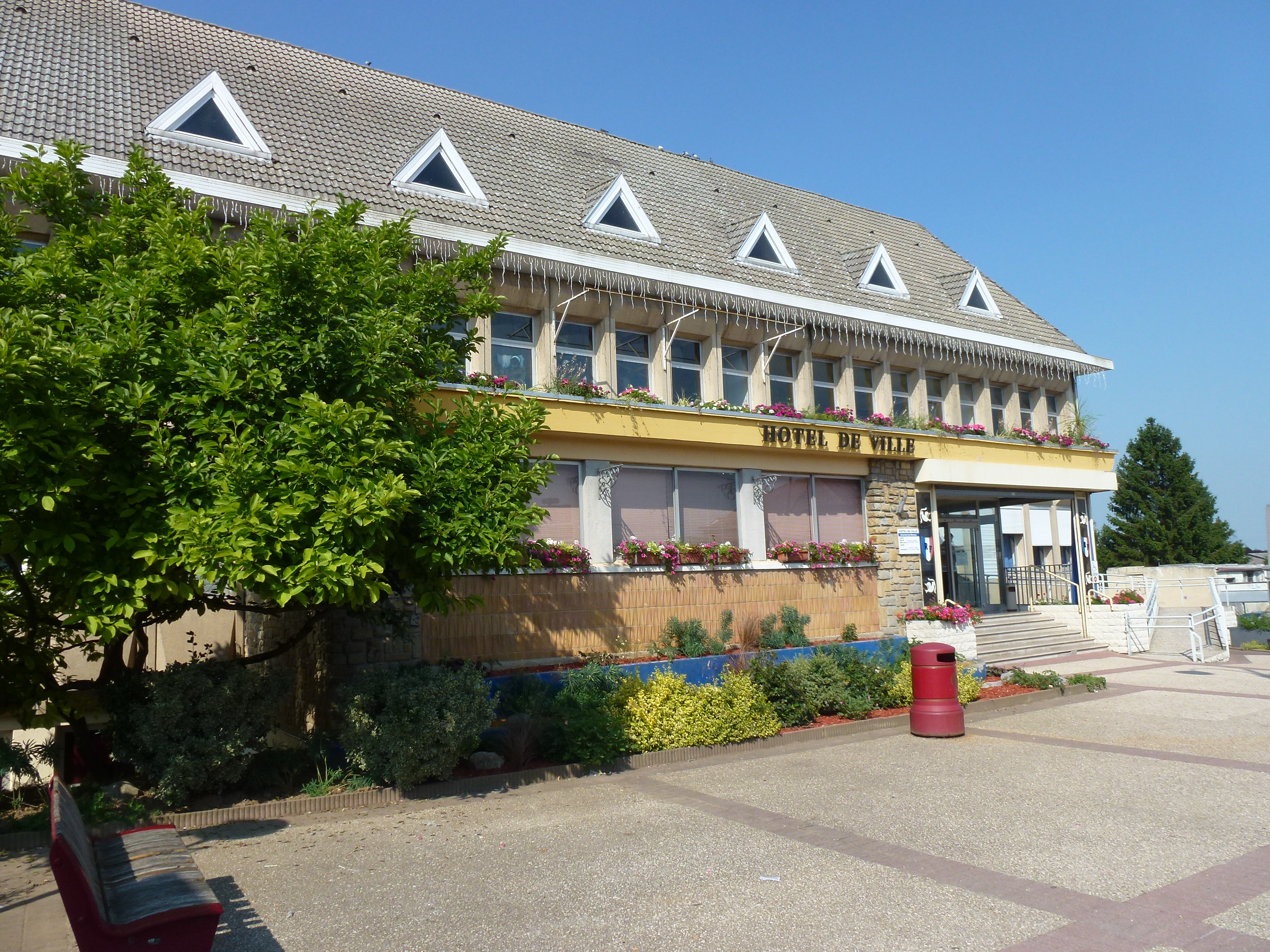
- The town hall of Courcelles-lès-Lens

- Coat of arms
- Location of Courcelles-lès-Lens
- Location within France Location within Hauts-de-France
- Coordinates: 50°25′07″N 3°01′08″E
- Country: France
- Region: Hauts-de-France
- Department: Pas-de-Calais
- Arrondissement: Lens
- Canton: Hénin-Beaumont-2
- Intercommunality: CA Hénin-Carvin

Government
  - Mayor (2020–2026): Édith Bleuzet-Carlier
- Area^{1}: 5.56 km^{2} (2.15 sq mi)
- Elevation: 29 m (95 ft)
- Highest elevation: 45 m (148 ft)
- Lowest elevation: 20 m (66 ft)
- Population (2023): 7,830
  - Density: 1,410/km^{2} (3,650/sq mi)
- Time zone: UTC+01:00 (CET)
  - Summer (DST): UTC+02:00 (CEST)
- INSEE/Postal code: 62249 /62970
- ^{1} French Land Register data, which excludes lakes, ponds, glaciers > 1 km^{2} (0.386 sq mi or 247 acres) and river estuaries.

Courcelles-lès-Lens (French pronunciation: [kuʁsɛl lɛ lɑ̃s], literally Courcelles near Lens; Picard: Courchelle-lès-Linse) is a commune in the Pas-de-Calais department in the Hauts-de-France region of France about 10 miles (16 km) east of Lens. The canalized river Deûle forms the north-eastern border of the commune.

== Population ==
Historical population
| Year | Pop. | ±% p.a. |
|---|---|---|
| 1968 | 5,965 | — |
| 1975 | 5,874 | −0.22% |
| 1982 | 5,855 | −0.05% |
| 1990 | 6,343 | +1.01% |
| 1999 | 6,119 | −0.40% |
| 2007 | 5,965 | −0.32% |
| 2012 | 6,439 | +1.54% |
| 2017 | 7,774 | +3.84% |
| 2023 | 7,830 | +0.12% |
Source: INSEE

== See also ==
- Communes of the Pas-de-Calais department
