= Canton of Harnes =

Coordinates: 50°27′52″N 2°54′00″E

Harnes
- Canton
- Location of Harnes within the department
- Country: France
- Region: Hauts-de-France
- Department: Pas-de-Calais
- No. of communes: {{{nbcomm}}}
- Area: 31.72 km^{2} (12.25 sq mi)
- Population (2023): 42,516
  - Density: 1,340/km^{2} (3,471/sq mi)
- INSEE code: 62 26

The canton of Harnes is a canton situated in the department of the Pas-de-Calais and in the Hauts-de-France region of northern France.

== Geography ==
The canton is organised around Harnes in the arrondissement of Lens. The elevation varies from 20m (Estevelles) to 46m (Harnes) for an average elevation of 29m.

== Composition ==
At the French canton reorganisation which came into effect in March 2015, the canton was expanded from 3 to 6 communes:

- Billy-Montigny
- Bois-Bernard
- Fouquières-lès-Lens
- Harnes
- Noyelles-sous-Lens
- Rouvroy

== Population ==
Historical population
Year	Pop.	±% p.a.
2013	43,185	—
2018	43,267	+0.04%
Source: INSEE

== See also ==
- Cantons of Pas-de-Calais
- Communes of Pas-de-Calais
- Arrondissements of the Pas-de-Calais department
