= Éleu-dit-Leauwette =

- Commune
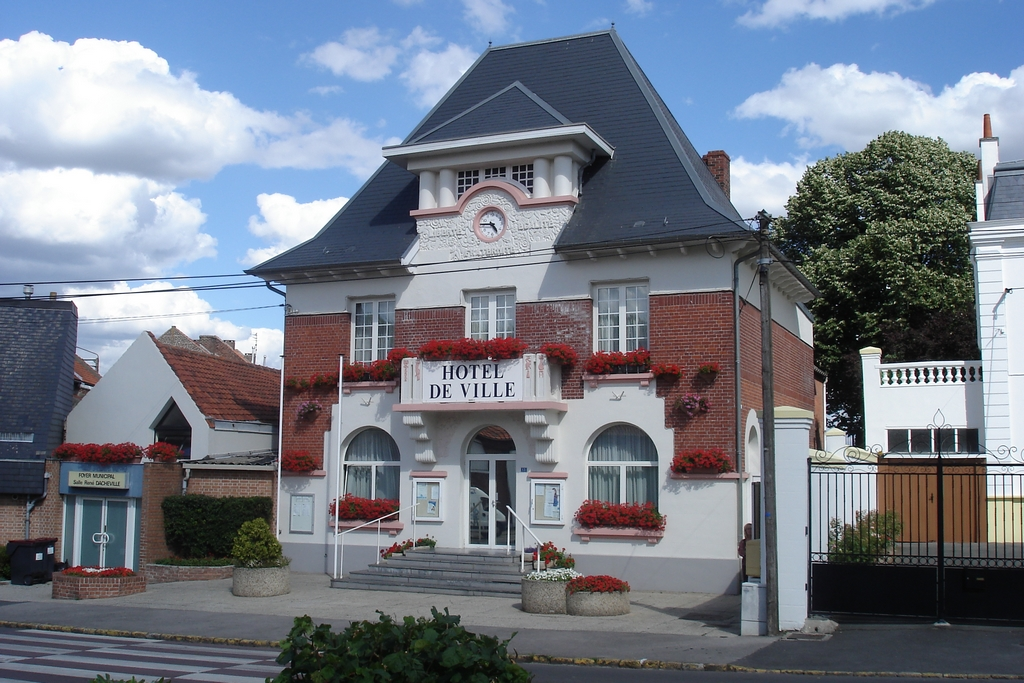
- Town hall

- Coat of arms
- Location of Éleu-dit-Leauwette
- Location within France Location within Hauts-de-France
- Coordinates: 50°25′18″N 2°48′43″E
- Country: France
- Region: Hauts-de-France
- Department: Pas-de-Calais
- Arrondissement: Lens
- Canton: Liévin
- Intercommunality: CA Lens-Liévin

Government
  - Mayor (2020–2026): Bernard Pruneau
- Area^{1}: 1.17 km^{2} (0.45 sq mi)
- Elevation: 44 m (144 ft)
- Highest elevation: 66 m (217 ft)
- Lowest elevation: 31 m (102 ft)
- Population (2023): 2,805
  - Density: 2,400/km^{2} (6,210/sq mi)
- Time zone: UTC+01:00 (CET)
  - Summer (DST): UTC+02:00 (CEST)
- INSEE/Postal code: 62291 /62300
- ^{1} French Land Register data, which excludes lakes, ponds, glaciers > 1 km^{2} (0.386 sq mi or 247 acres) and river estuaries.

Éleu-dit-Leauwette (French pronunciation: [elø di lowɛt]; Picard: Liauwette) is a commune in the Pas-de-Calais department in the Hauts-de-France region of France 1 mile (1.6 km) south of the centre of Lens.

== Population ==
Historical population
Year	Pop.	±% p.a.
1968	2,967	—
1975	2,878	−0.43%
1982	3,710	+3.69%
1990	3,402	−1.08%
1999	3,107	−1.00%
2007	2,989	−0.48%
2012	2,869	−0.82%
2017	2,920	+0.35%
2023	2,805	−0.67%
Source: INSEE

== See also ==
- Communes of the Pas-de-Calais department
