= Évin-Malmaison =

- Commune
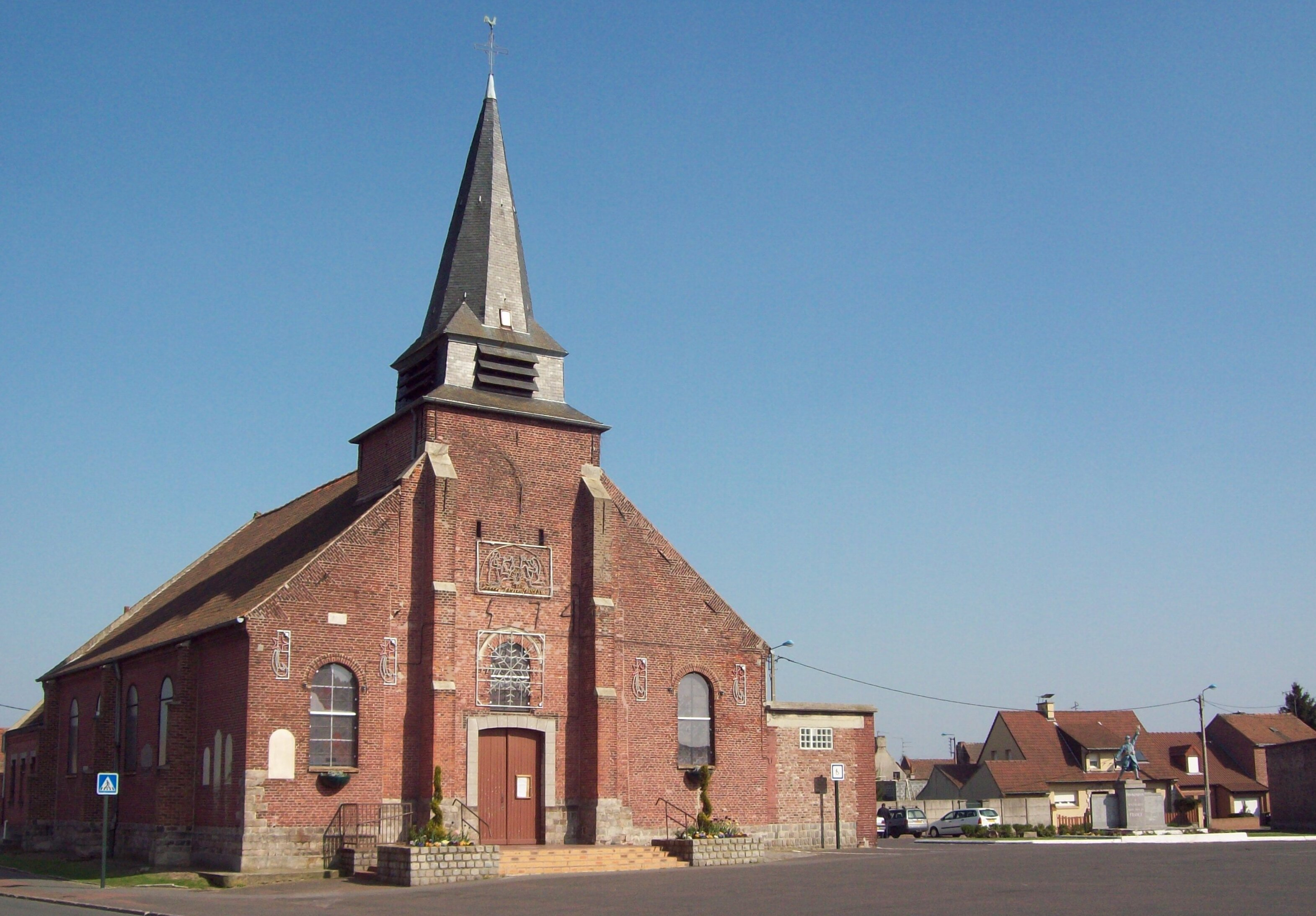
- The church of Évin-Malmaison

- Coat of arms
- Location of Évin-Malmaison
- Location within France Location within Hauts-de-France
- Coordinates: 50°26′20″N 3°02′03″E
- Country: France
- Region: Hauts-de-France
- Department: Pas-de-Calais
- Arrondissement: Lens
- Canton: Hénin-Beaumont-2
- Intercommunality: CA Hénin-Carvin

Government
  - Mayor (2020–2026): Valérie Petit
- Area^{1}: 4.57 km^{2} (1.76 sq mi)
- Elevation: 26 m (85 ft)
- Highest elevation: 31 m (102 ft)
- Lowest elevation: 21 m (69 ft)
- Population (2023): 4,628
  - Density: 1,010/km^{2} (2,620/sq mi)
- Time zone: UTC+01:00 (CET)
  - Summer (DST): UTC+02:00 (CEST)
- INSEE/Postal code: 62321 /62141
- ^{1} French Land Register data, which excludes lakes, ponds, glaciers > 1 km^{2} (0.386 sq mi or 247 acres) and river estuaries.

Évin-Malmaison (French pronunciation: [evɛ̃ malmɛzɔ̃]) is a commune in the Pas-de-Calais department in the Hauts-de-France region of France.

== Geography ==
An ex-coalmining village, now centred on farming and light industry, situated some 10 miles (16 km) east of Lens, at the junction of the D161 and the D54. The canalised river Deûle forms the south-western boundary of the commune.

== Population ==
Historical population
Year	Pop.	±% p.a.
1968	4,437	—
1975	4,388	−0.16%
1982	4,121	−0.89%
1990	4,934	+2.28%
1999	4,731	−0.47%
2007	4,506	−0.61%
2012	4,578	+0.32%
2017	4,551	−0.12%
2023	4,628	+0.28%
Source: INSEE

== Places of interest ==
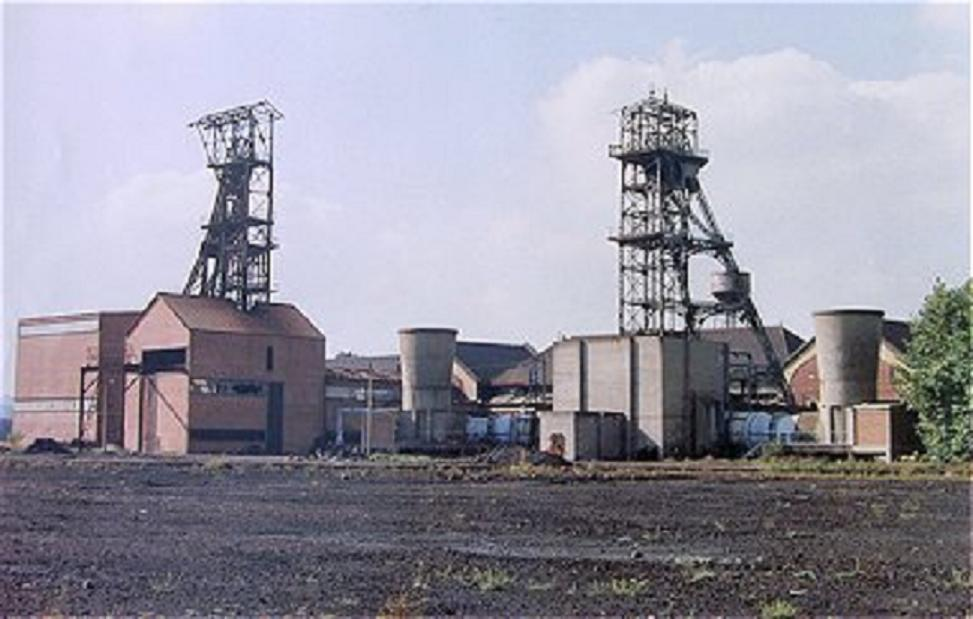
The two pit heads at Évin-Malmaison (c.1980s)

- The church of St.Vaast, dating from the sixteenth century.
- The war memorial.
- Remains of an 18th-century priory.

== See also ==
- Communes of the Pas-de-Calais department
