= Angres =

- Commune
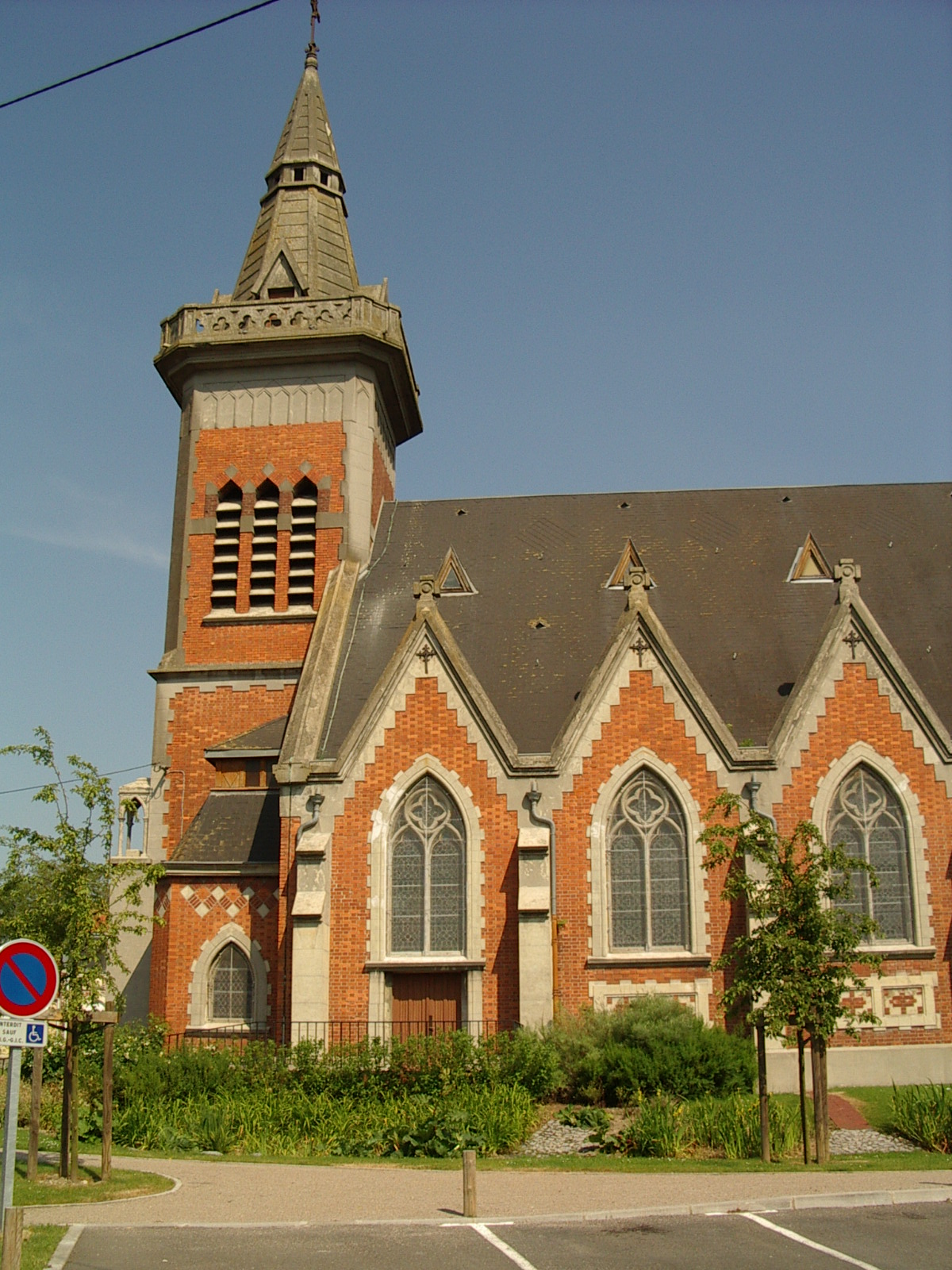
- The church of Angres

- Coat of arms
- Location of Angres
- Location within France Location within Hauts-de-France
- Coordinates: 50°24′35″N 2°45′33″E
- Country: France
- Region: Hauts-de-France
- Department: Pas-de-Calais
- Arrondissement: Lens
- Canton: Bully-les-Mines
- Intercommunality: Communaupole de Lens-Liévin

Government
  - Mayor (2023–2026): Anouck Breton
- Area^{1}: 4.82 km^{2} (1.86 sq mi)
- Elevation: 54 m (177 ft)
- Highest elevation: 106 m (348 ft)
- Lowest elevation: 49 m (161 ft)
- Population (2023): 4,641
  - Density: 963/km^{2} (2,490/sq mi)
- Time zone: UTC+01:00 (CET)
  - Summer (DST): UTC+02:00 (CEST)
- INSEE/Postal code: 62032 /62143
- ^{1} French Land Register data, which excludes lakes, ponds, glaciers > 1 km^{2} (0.386 sq mi or 247 acres) and river estuaries.

Angres (French pronunciation: [ɑ̃ɡʁ]) is a commune in the Pas-de-Calais department in the Hauts-de-France region of France.

== Geography ==
A farming and light industrial suburb situated just 3 miles (4.8 km) southwest of Lens centre, at the junction of the D51 and D58e roads. The A26 autoroute passes by, just within the borders of the commune.

== Population ==
Historical population
Year	Pop.	±% p.a.
1968	4,384	—
1975	4,538	+0.49%
1982	4,239	−0.97%
1990	4,394	+0.45%
1999	4,469	+0.19%
2007	4,054	−1.21%
2012	4,067	+0.06%
2017	4,526	+2.16%
2023	4,641	+0.42%
Source: INSEE

== Sights ==
- The church of St. Cyr, rebuilt, as was most of the village, after the First World War.
- The war memorials.

== International relations ==
Angres is twinned with: Danderhall, Midlothian, Scotland.

== See also ==
- Communes of the Pas-de-Calais department
