= Noyelles-Godault =

- Commune
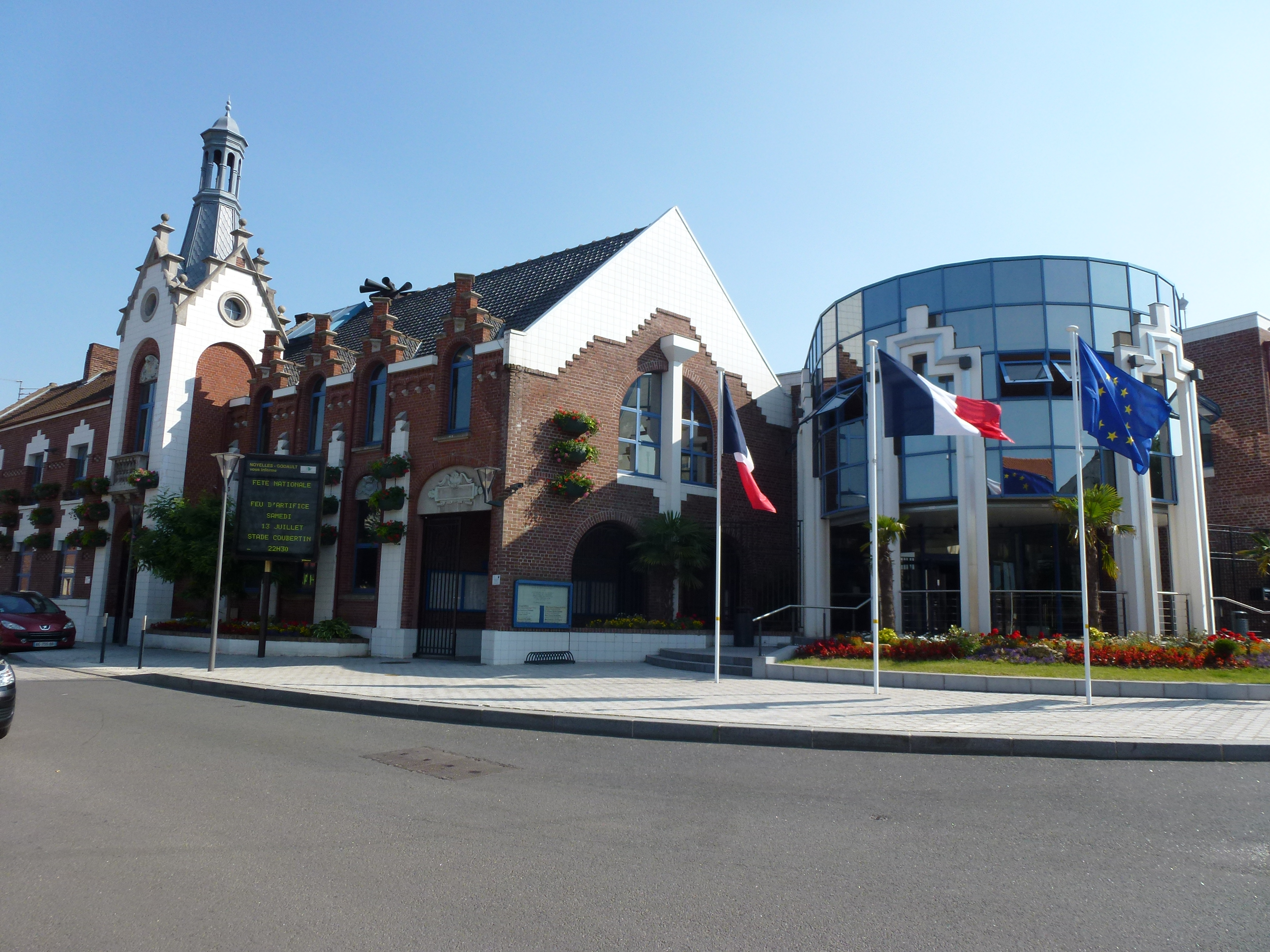
- The town hall of Noyelles-Godault

- Coat of arms
- Location of Noyelles-Godault
- Location within France Location within Hauts-de-France
- Coordinates: 50°25′15″N 2°59′41″E
- Country: France
- Region: Hauts-de-France
- Department: Pas-de-Calais
- Arrondissement: Lens
- Canton: Hénin-Beaumont-2
- Intercommunality: CA Hénin-Carvin

Government
  - Mayor (2023–2026): Valérie Biegalski
- Area^{1}: 5.45 km^{2} (2.10 sq mi)
- Elevation: 35 m (115 ft)
- Highest elevation: 50 m (160 ft)
- Lowest elevation: 22 m (72 ft)
- Population (2023): 5,994
  - Density: 1,100/km^{2} (2,850/sq mi)
- Time zone: UTC+01:00 (CET)
  - Summer (DST): UTC+02:00 (CEST)
- INSEE/Postal code: 62624 /62950
- ^{1} French Land Register data, which excludes lakes, ponds, glaciers > 1 km^{2} (0.386 sq mi or 247 acres) and river estuaries.

Noyelles-Godault (French pronunciation: [nwajɛl ɡɔdo]; Picard: Nöyel-Godault) is a commune in the Pas-de-Calais department in the Hauts-de-France region of France 10 miles (16 km) east of Lens.

== Population ==
Historical population
Year	Pop.	±% p.a.
1968	5,551	—
1975	5,050	−1.34%
1982	5,474	+1.16%
1990	5,655	+0.41%
1999	5,539	−0.23%
2007	5,186	−0.82%
2012	5,117	−0.27%
2017	5,973	+3.14%
2023	5,994	+0.06%
Source: INSEE

== Notable people ==
- Maurice Thorez, politician, was born there in 1900.

== See also ==
- Communes of the Pas-de-Calais department
