= Méricourt, Pas-de-Calais =

Méricourt
- Commune
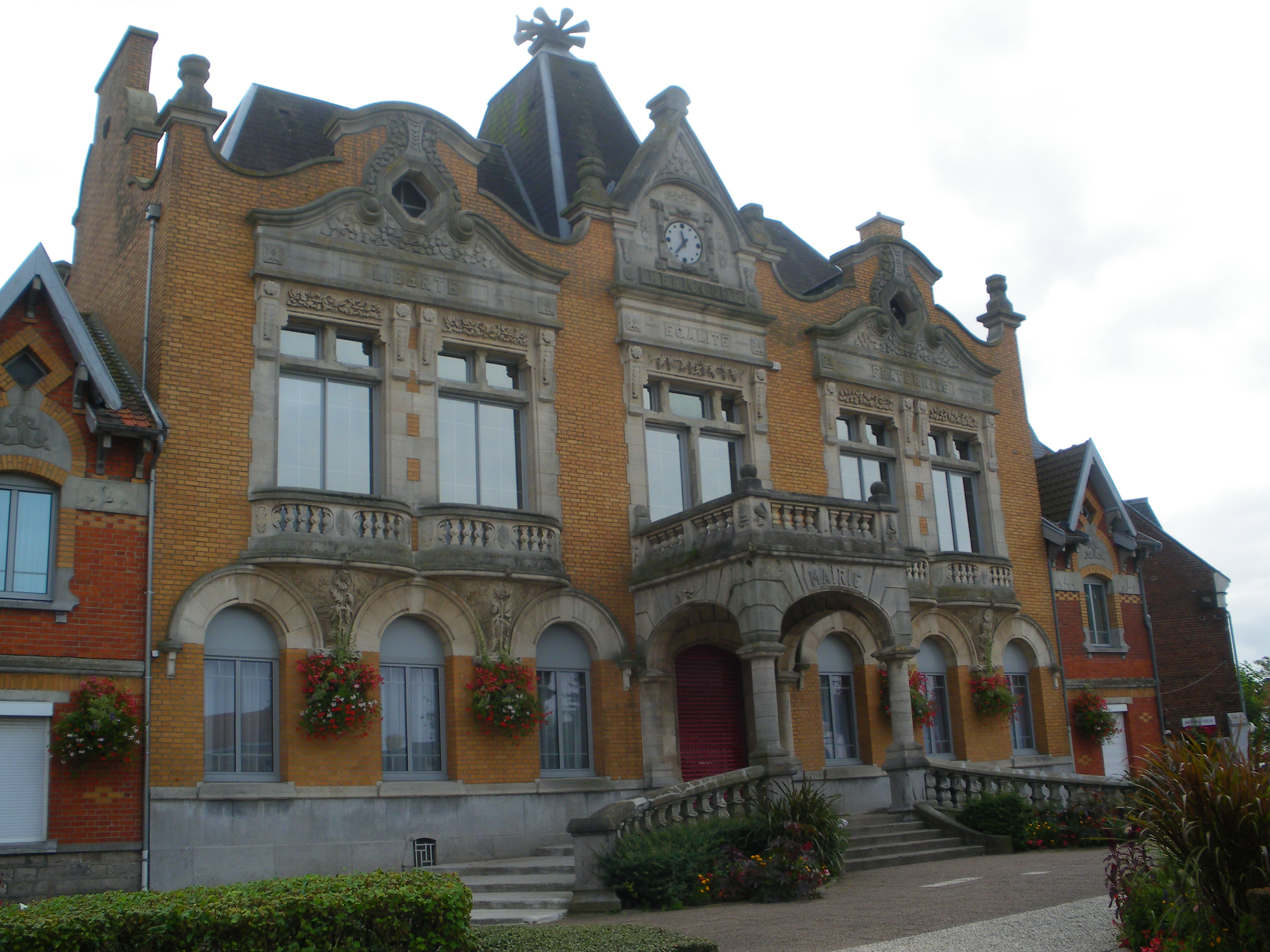
- The town hall of Méricourt

- Coat of arms
- Location of Méricourt
- Location within France Location within Hauts-de-France
- Coordinates: 50°24′11″N 2°52′00″E
- Country: France
- Region: Hauts-de-France
- Department: Pas-de-Calais
- Arrondissement: Lens
- Canton: Avion
- Intercommunality: CA Lens-Liévin

Government
  - Mayor (2020–2026): Bernard Baude
- Area^{1}: 7.53 km^{2} (2.91 sq mi)
- Elevation: 55 m (180 ft)
- Highest elevation: 63 m (207 ft)
- Lowest elevation: 31 m (102 ft)
- Population (2023): 11,619
  - Density: 1,540/km^{2} (4,000/sq mi)
- Time zone: UTC+01:00 (CET)
  - Summer (DST): UTC+02:00 (CEST)
- INSEE/Postal code: 62570 /62680
- ^{1} French Land Register data, which excludes lakes, ponds, glaciers > 1 km^{2} (0.386 sq mi or 247 acres) and river estuaries.

Méricourt (French pronunciation: [meʁikuʁ]) is a commune in the Pas-de-Calais department in the Hauts-de-France region of France 3 miles (4.8 km) southeast of Lens The commune is part of the canton of Avion.

== History ==
The Courrières mine disaster killed 1,099 on 10 March 1906. The communes affected were Méricourt, Billy-Montigny, Noyelles-sous-Lens and Sallaumines.

== Population ==
Historical population
Year	Pop.	±% p.a.
1968	13,416	—
1975	13,806	+0.41%
1982	13,273	−0.56%
1990	12,330	−0.92%
1999	11,723	−0.56%
2007	12,087	+0.38%
2012	11,751	−0.56%
2017	11,363	−0.67%
2023	11,619	+0.37%
Source: INSEE

== See also ==
- Communes of the Pas-de-Calais department
