= Annay, Pas-de-Calais =

Annay
- Commune
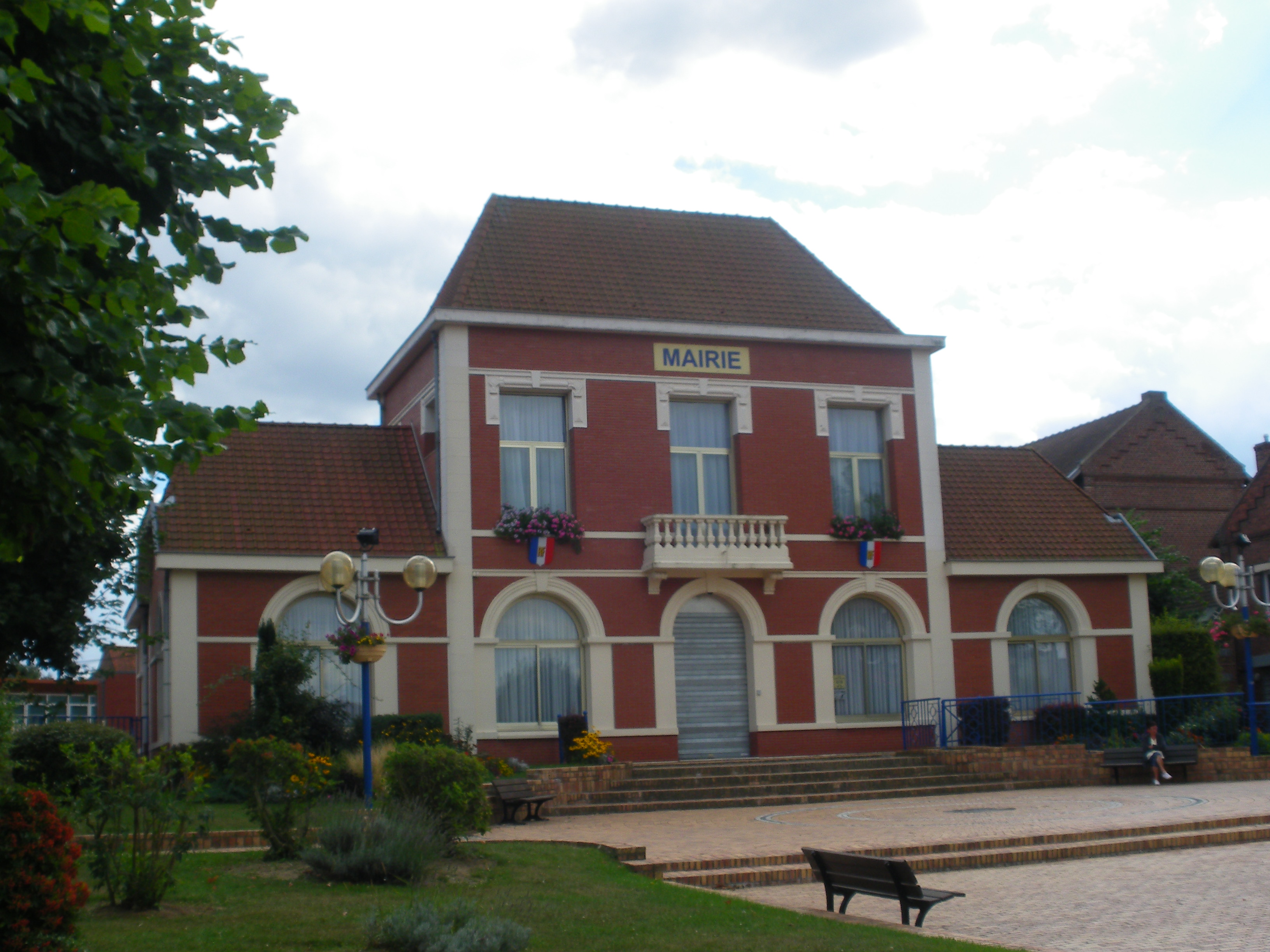
- The town hall of Annay

- Coat of arms
- Location of Annay
- Location within France Location within Hauts-de-France
- Coordinates: 50°27′51″N 2°52′59″E
- Country: France
- Region: Hauts-de-France
- Department: Pas-de-Calais
- Arrondissement: Lens
- Canton: Lens
- Intercommunality: Communaupole de Lens-Liévin

Government
  - Mayor (2020–2026): Yves Terlat
- Area^{1}: 4.33 km^{2} (1.67 sq mi)
- Elevation: 27 m (89 ft)
- Highest elevation: 44 m (144 ft)
- Lowest elevation: 21 m (69 ft)
- Population (2023): 4,571
  - Density: 1,060/km^{2} (2,730/sq mi)
- Time zone: UTC+01:00 (CET)
  - Summer (DST): UTC+02:00 (CEST)
- INSEE/Postal code: 62033 /62880
- ^{1} French Land Register data, which excludes lakes, ponds, glaciers > 1 km^{2} (0.386 sq mi or 247 acres) and river estuaries.

Annay (French pronunciation: [anɛ]; also referred to as Annay-sous-Lens, literally Annay under Lens) is a commune in the Pas-de-Calais department in the Hauts-de-France region of France.

== Geography ==
A large farming village, with a large lake and marshes, situated some 3 miles (4.8 km) northeast of Lens at the junction of the D917 and D39 roads. The canalized Deûle river forms much of the northeast border of the commune.

== Population ==
Historical population
| Year | Pop. | ±% p.a. |
|---|---|---|
| 1968 | 5,236 | — |
| 1975 | 5,139 | −0.27% |
| 1982 | 4,862 | −0.79% |
| 1990 | 5,132 | +0.68% |
| 1999 | 4,718 | −0.93% |
| 2007 | 4,389 | −0.90% |
| 2012 | 4,237 | −0.70% |
| 2017 | 4,337 | +0.47% |
| 2023 | 4,571 | +0.88% |
Source: INSEE

== Sights ==
- The church of St. Amé, rebuilt, as was most of the village, after the First World War.
- The war memorial.
- An abandoned protestant church.

== See also ==
- Communes of the Pas-de-Calais department
- St Bernard's Catholic Grammar School
