= Bois-Bernard =

- Commune
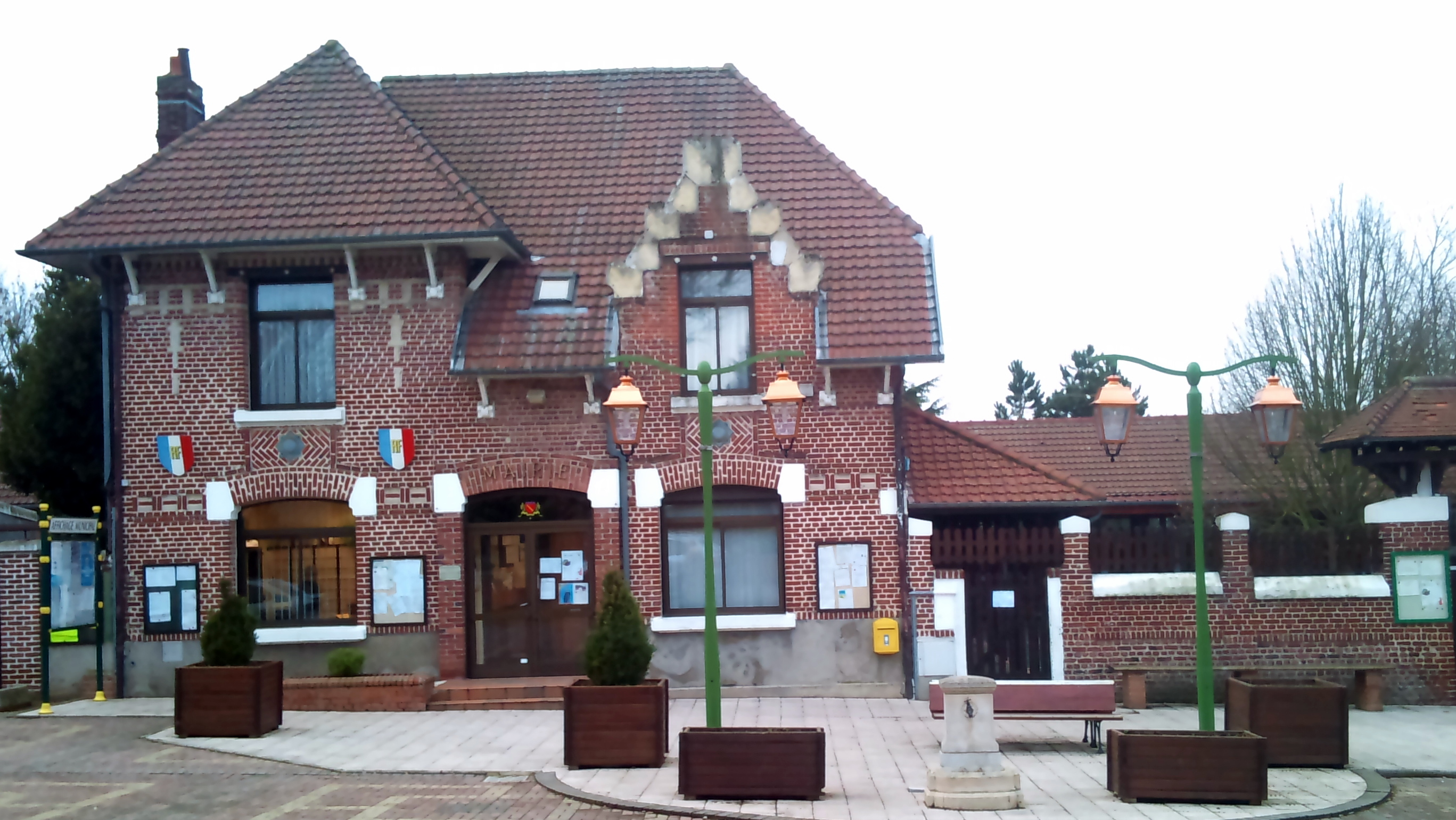
- The town hall of Bois Bernard

- Coat of arms
- Location of Bois-Bernard
- Location within France Location within Hauts-de-France
- Coordinates: 50°23′39″N 2°54′44″E
- Country: France
- Region: Hauts-de-France
- Department: Pas-de-Calais
- Arrondissement: Lens
- Canton: Harnes
- Intercommunality: CA Hénin-Carvin

Government
  - Mayor (2020–2026): Jean-Marie Monchy
- Area^{1}: 3.97 km^{2} (1.53 sq mi)
- Elevation: 65 m (213 ft)
- Highest elevation: 70 m (230 ft)
- Lowest elevation: 41 m (135 ft)
- Population (2023): 839
  - Density: 211/km^{2} (547/sq mi)
- Time zone: UTC+01:00 (CET)
  - Summer (DST): UTC+02:00 (CEST)
- INSEE/Postal code: 62148 /62320
- ^{1} French Land Register data, which excludes lakes, ponds, glaciers > 1 km^{2} (0.386 sq mi or 247 acres) and river estuaries.

Bois-Bernard (French pronunciation: [bwa bɛʁnaʁ]) is a commune in the Pas-de-Calais department in the Hauts-de-France region in northern France.

== Geography ==
The village is mainly a farming village located 10 miles (16 km) northeast of Arras on the D919 and D46 roads. It is located on the edge of First World War battlefields, and spent munitions are regularly uncovered by farmers.

== History ==
The village has had various names over the centuries:

- 1162 : Nemus Bernardi,
- 1221 : Boscus Bernardi,
- 1289 : Le Bos Biernart,
- 1362 : Bosbernart,
- 1452 : Boz-Bernard
- 1720 : Le Bois-Bernard.

During World War I, the village was destroyed. It was awarded the Croix de Guerre on the 25 September 1920.

== Population ==
Historical population
Year	Pop.	±% p.a.
1968	609	—
1975	614	+0.12%
1982	672	+1.30%
1990	816	+2.46%
1999	840	+0.32%
2007	822	−0.27%
2012	842	+0.48%
2017	827	−0.36%
2023	839	+0.24%
Source: INSEE

== Sights ==
- The church of Notre-Dame, rebuilt after the destruction of the village during World War I.
- The ruins of a 13th-century castle.

== Twinning ==
The village is twinned with the village of Grendon in Northamptonshire, England.
