= Leforest =

- Commune
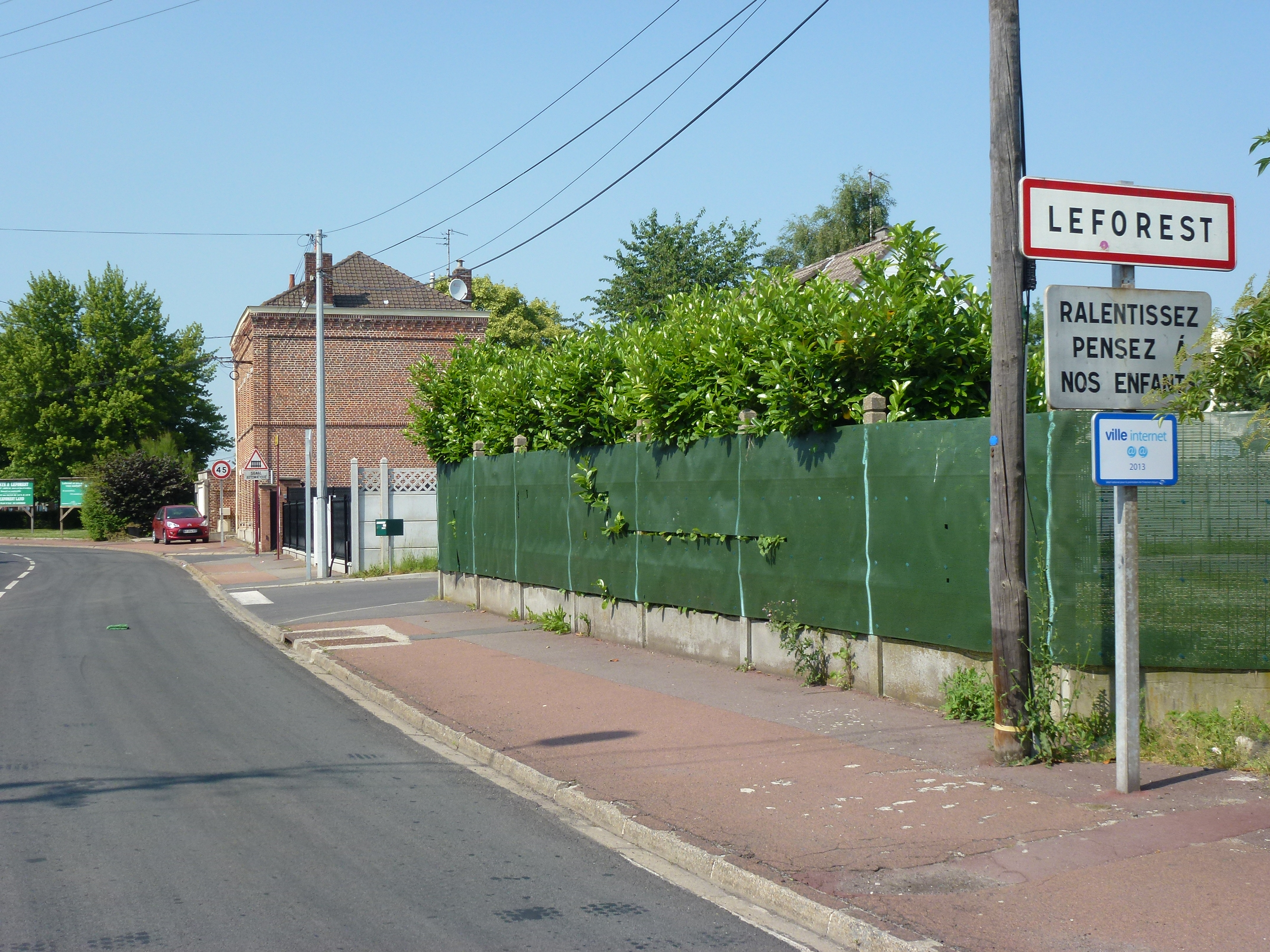
- The road into Leforest

- Coat of arms
- Location of Leforest
- Location within France Location within Hauts-de-France
- Coordinates: 50°26′17″N 3°03′54″E
- Country: France
- Region: Hauts-de-France
- Department: Pas-de-Calais
- Arrondissement: Lens
- Canton: Hénin-Beaumont-2
- Intercommunality: CA Hénin-Carvin

Government
  - Mayor (2020–2026): Christian Musial
- Area^{1}: 6.22 km^{2} (2.40 sq mi)
- Elevation: 24 m (79 ft)
- Highest elevation: 66 m (217 ft)
- Lowest elevation: 20 m (66 ft)
- Population (2023): 7,060
  - Density: 1,140/km^{2} (2,940/sq mi)
- Time zone: UTC+01:00 (CET)
  - Summer (DST): UTC+02:00 (CEST)
- INSEE/Postal code: 62497 /62790
- ^{1} French Land Register data, which excludes lakes, ponds, glaciers > 1 km^{2} (0.386 sq mi or 247 acres) and river estuaries.

Leforest (French pronunciation: [ləfɔʁɛ]) is a commune in the Pas-de-Calais department in the Hauts-de-France region of France about 12 miles (19 km) east of Lens.

== Population ==
The inhabitants are called Leforestois in French.

Historical population
Year	Pop.	±% p.a.
1968	7,989	—
1975	8,047	+0.10%
1982	7,882	−0.30%
1990	7,195	−1.13%
1999	6,746	−0.71%
2007	7,127	+0.69%
2012	6,998	−0.36%
2017	7,167	+0.48%
2023	7,060	−0.25%
Source: INSEE

== See also ==
- Communes of the Pas-de-Calais department
