= Dourges =

- Commune
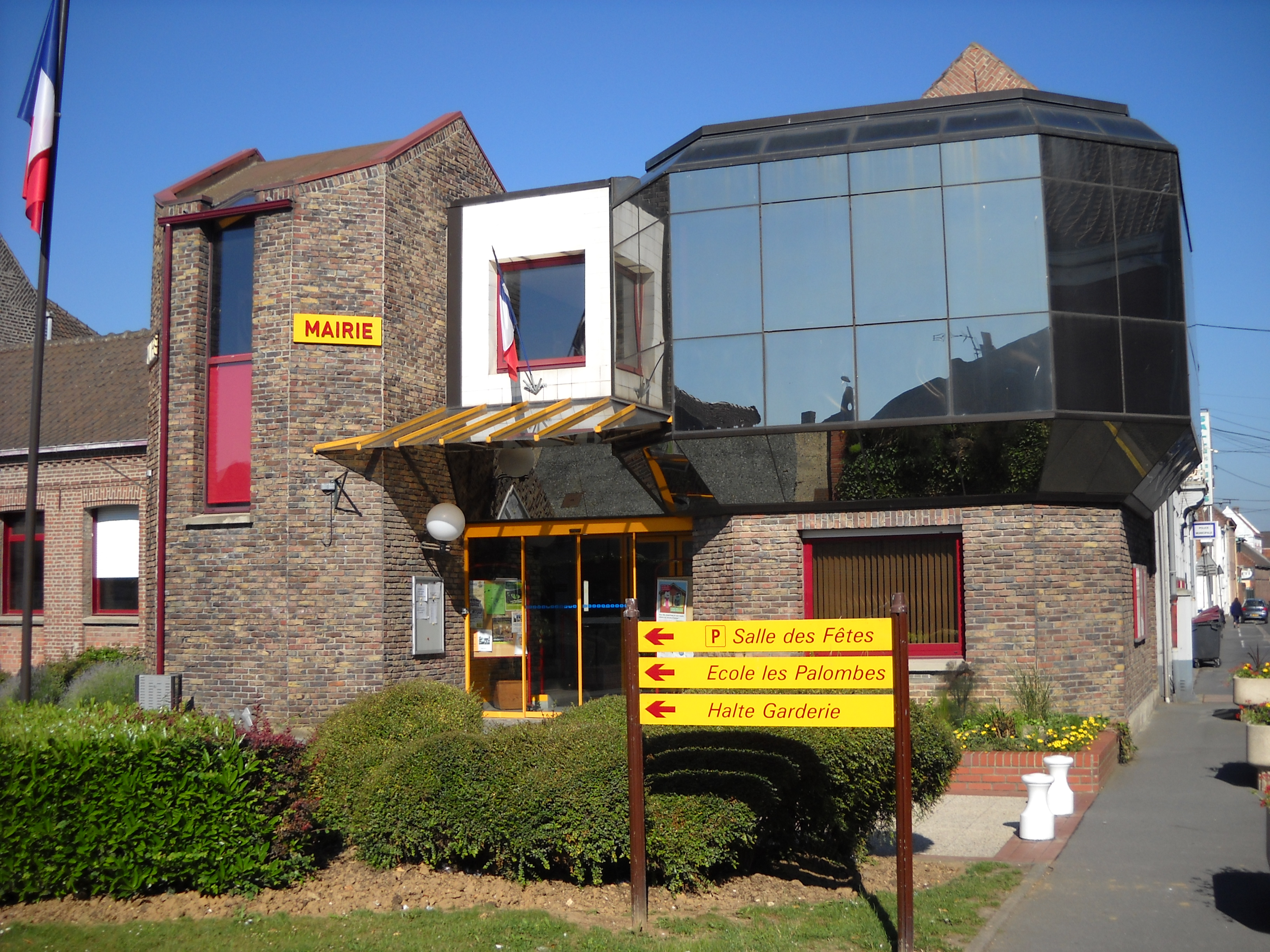
- The town hall of Dourges

- Coat of arms
- Location of Dourges
- Location within France Location within Hauts-de-France
- Coordinates: 50°26′13″N 2°59′15″E
- Country: France
- Region: Hauts-de-France
- Department: Pas-de-Calais
- Arrondissement: Lens
- Canton: Hénin-Beaumont-1
- Intercommunality: CA Hénin-Carvin

Government
  - Mayor (2020–2026): Tony Franconville
- Area^{1}: 10.48 km^{2} (4.05 sq mi)
- Elevation: 29 m (95 ft)
- Highest elevation: 35 m (115 ft)
- Lowest elevation: 23 m (75 ft)
- Population (2023): 6,139
  - Density: 585.8/km^{2} (1,517/sq mi)
- Time zone: UTC+01:00 (CET)
  - Summer (DST): UTC+02:00 (CEST)
- INSEE/Postal code: 62274 /62119
- ^{1} French Land Register data, which excludes lakes, ponds, glaciers > 1 km^{2} (0.386 sq mi or 247 acres) and river estuaries.

Dourges (French pronunciation: [duʁʒ]) is a commune in the Pas-de-Calais department in the Hauts-de-France region of France about 8 miles (13 km) east of Lens. The canalized river Deûle flows through the commune.

== Population ==
Historical population
Year	Pop.	±% p.a.
1968	5,746	—
1975	5,402	−0.88%
1982	5,201	−0.54%
1990	5,806	+1.39%
1999	5,676	−0.25%
2007	5,637	−0.09%
2012	5,684	+0.17%
2017	5,891	+0.72%
2023	6,139	+0.69%
Source: INSEE

== See also ==
- Communes of the Pas-de-Calais department
