= Montigny-en-Gohelle =

- Commune
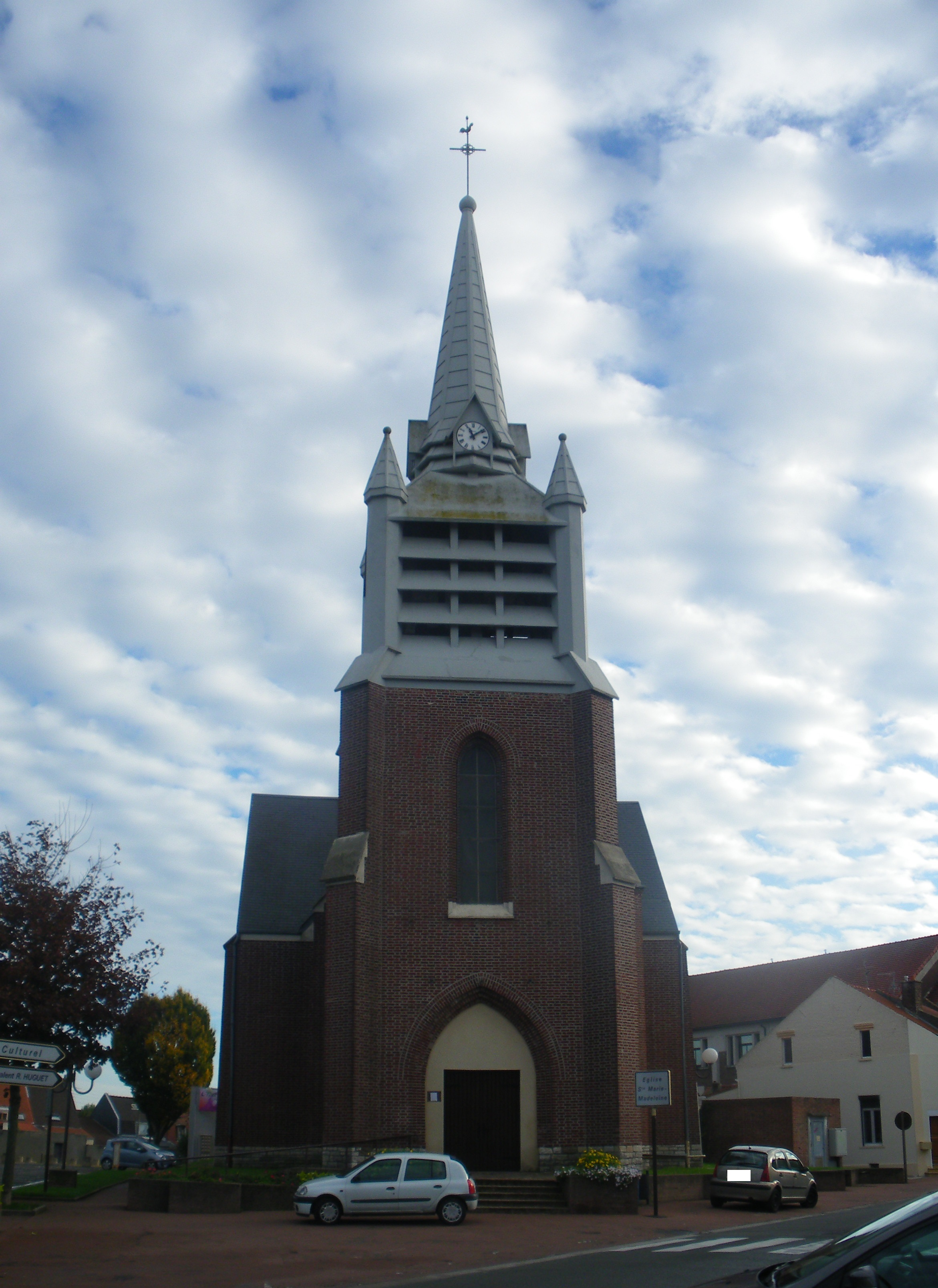
- The church of Montigny-en-Gohelle

- Coat of arms
- Location of Montigny-en-Gohelle
- Location within France Location within Hauts-de-France
- Coordinates: 50°25′43″N 2°55′51″E
- Country: France
- Region: Hauts-de-France
- Department: Pas-de-Calais
- Arrondissement: Lens
- Canton: Hénin-Beaumont-1
- Intercommunality: CA Hénin-Carvin

Government
  - Mayor (2020–2026): Marcello Della Franca
- Area^{1}: 3.5 km^{2} (1.4 sq mi)
- Highest elevation: 42 m (138 ft)
- Lowest elevation: 23 m (75 ft)
- Population (2023): 9,743
  - Density: 2,800/km^{2} (7,200/sq mi)
- Time zone: UTC+01:00 (CET)
  - Summer (DST): UTC+02:00 (CEST)
- INSEE/Postal code: 62587 /62640
- ^{1} French Land Register data, which excludes lakes, ponds, glaciers > 1 km^{2} (0.386 sq mi or 247 acres) and river estuaries.

Montigny-en-Gohelle (French pronunciation: [mɔ̃tiɲi ɑ̃ ɡɔɛl], lit. 'Montigny in Gohelle') is a commune in the Pas-de-Calais department in the Hauts-de-France region of France 7 miles (11 km) east of Lens.

== Population ==
Historical population
Year	Pop.	±% p.a.
1968	8,908	—
1975	9,232	+0.51%
1982	11,140	+2.72%
1990	10,629	−0.59%
1999	10,558	−0.07%
2007	10,338	−0.26%
2012	10,326	−0.02%
2017	10,198	−0.25%
2023	9,743	−0.76%
Source: INSEE

== Twin towns ==
Montigny-en-Gohelle is twinned with:

- Al-Yamun, Palestine
- Câmpeni, Romania
- Stollberg, Germany

== See also ==
- Communes of the Pas-de-Calais department
