= Noyelles-sous-Lens =

- Commune
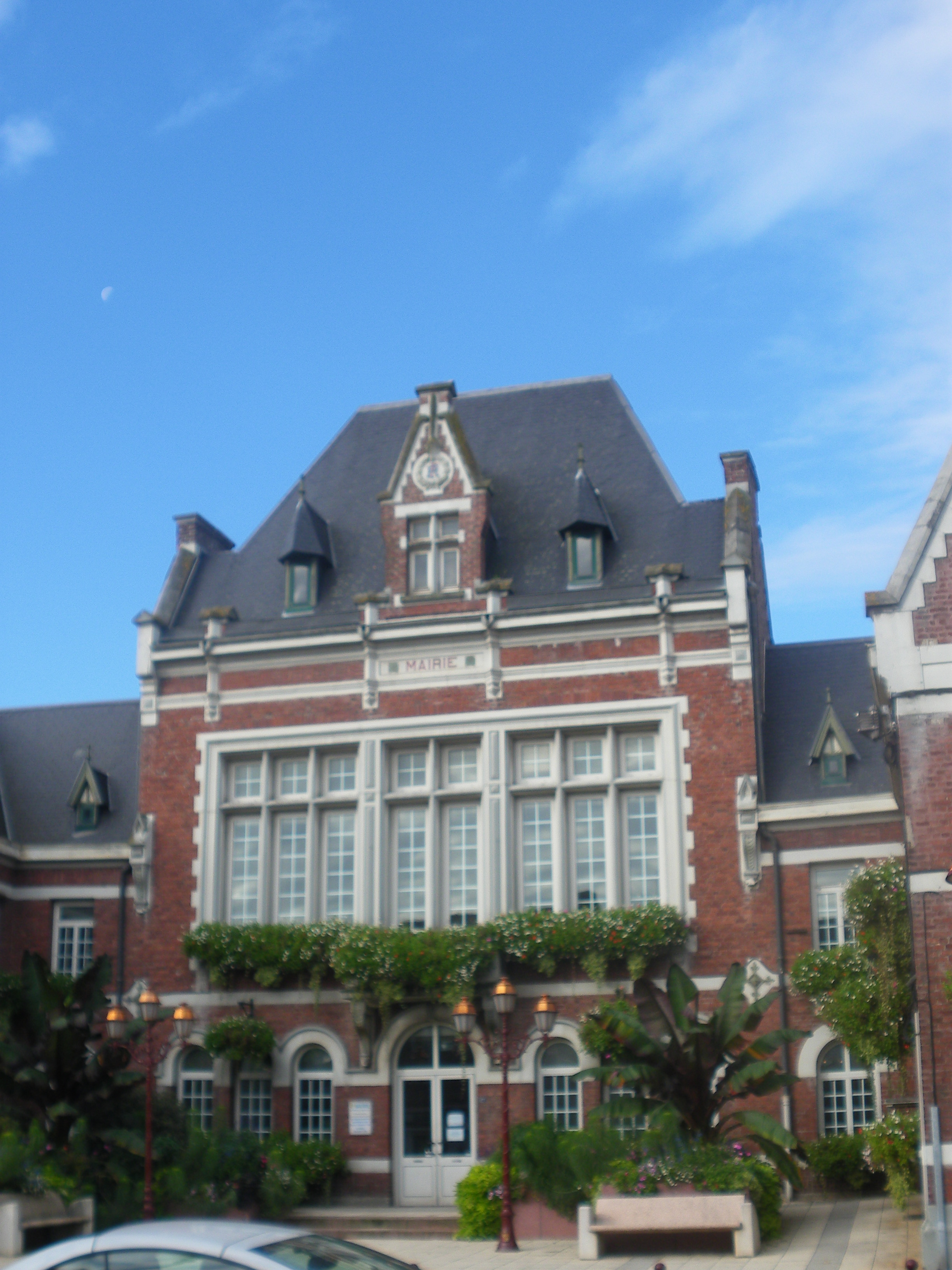
- The town hall of Noyelles-sous-Lens

- Coat of arms
- Location of Noyelles-sous-Lens
- Location within France Location within Hauts-de-France
- Coordinates: 50°25′52″N 2°52′25″E
- Country: France
- Region: Hauts-de-France
- Department: Pas-de-Calais
- Arrondissement: Lens
- Canton: Harnes
- Intercommunality: CA Lens-Liévin

Government
  - Mayor (2020–2026): Alain Roger
- Area^{1}: 3.72 km^{2} (1.44 sq mi)
- Highest elevation: 43 m (141 ft)
- Lowest elevation: 23 m (75 ft)
- Population (2023): 6,854
  - Density: 1,840/km^{2} (4,770/sq mi)
- Time zone: UTC+01:00 (CET)
  - Summer (DST): UTC+02:00 (CEST)
- INSEE/Postal code: 62628 /62221
- ^{1} French Land Register data, which excludes lakes, ponds, glaciers > 1 km^{2} (0.386 sq mi or 247 acres) and river estuaries.

Noyelles-sous-Lens (French pronunciation: [nwajɛl su lɑ̃s], literally Noyelles under Lens) is a commune in the Pas-de-Calais department in northern France. It is 3 km (2 mi) east of the centre of Lens.

== Administration ==
Noyelles-sous-Lens belongs to the Agglomeration community of Lens – Liévin, which consists of 36 communes, with a total population of 250,000 inhabitants.

== History ==
The Courrières mine disaster on 10 March 1906 affected Noyelles-sous-Lens.

== Population ==
Historical population
Year	Pop.	±% p.a.
1968	9,834	—
1975	8,779	−1.61%
1982	8,188	−0.99%
1990	7,687	−0.79%
1999	7,359	−0.48%
2007	6,991	−0.64%
2012	6,803	−0.54%
2017	6,561	−0.72%
2023	6,854	+0.73%
Source: INSEE

== Twin towns ==
Noyelles-sous-Lens is twinned with:

- Szczecinek, Poland since 1983
- (Republic of Ireland) Roundstone, Ireland since 2004

== Notable people ==
Noyelles-sous-Lens was the birthplace of Edita Piekha (born 1937), Russian actress and singer of French and Polish heritage.

== See also ==
- Communes of the Pas-de-Calais department
