= Canton of Hénin-Beaumont-1 =

Coordinates: 50.42°N 2.95°E

The canton of Hénin-Beaumont-1 is an administrative division of the Pas-de-Calais department, in northern France. It was created at the French canton reorganisation which came into effect in March 2015. Its seat is in Hénin-Beaumont.

It consists of the following communes:

1. Dourges
2. Hénin-Beaumont (partly)
3. Montigny-en-Gohelle
4. Oignies
