= Billy-Montigny =

- Commune
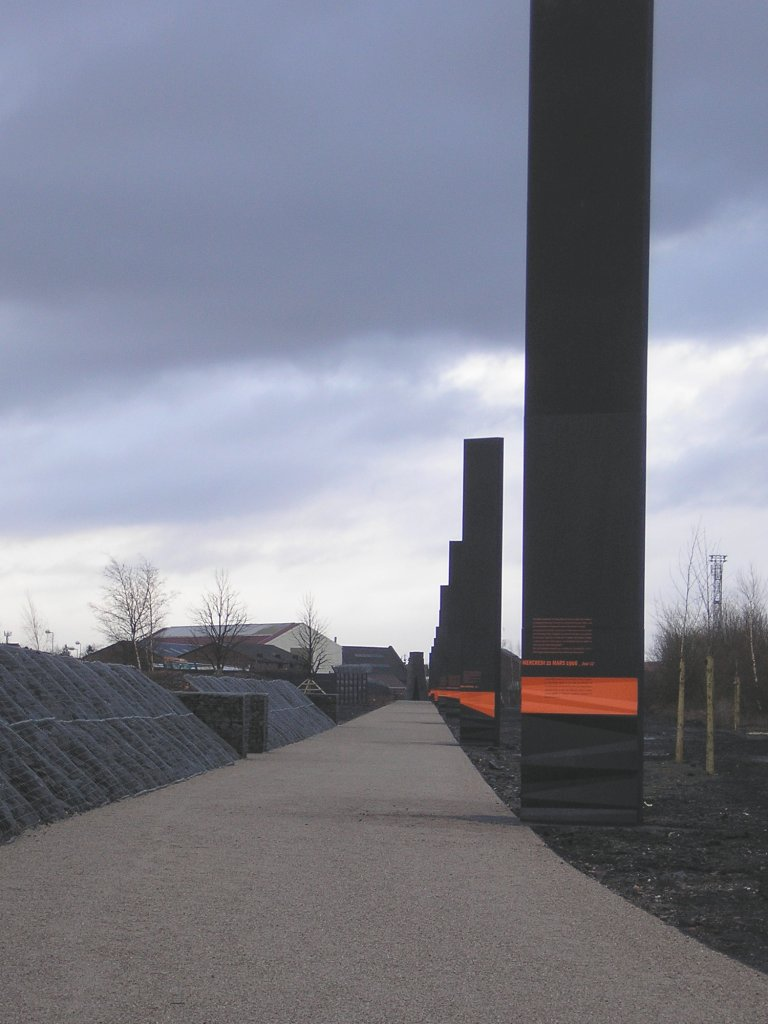
- Survivors Way that links the necropolis of Méricourt to pit no. 2 at Billy-Montigny

- Coat of arms
- Location of Billy-Montigny
- Location within France Location within Hauts-de-France
- Coordinates: 50°27′07″N 2°54′46″E
- Country: France
- Region: Hauts-de-France
- Department: Pas-de-Calais
- Arrondissement: Lens
- Canton: Harnes
- Intercommunality: Communaupole de Lens-Liévin

Government
  - Mayor (2020–2026): Bruno Troni
- Area^{1}: 2.71 km^{2} (1.05 sq mi)
- Highest elevation: 45 m (148 ft)
- Lowest elevation: 24 m (79 ft)
- Population (2023): 7,937
  - Density: 2,930/km^{2} (7,590/sq mi)
- Time zone: UTC+01:00 (CET)
  - Summer (DST): UTC+02:00 (CEST)
- INSEE/Postal code: 62133 /62420
- ^{1} French Land Register data, which excludes lakes, ponds, glaciers > 1 km^{2} (0.386 sq mi or 247 acres) and river estuaries.

Billy-Montigny (French pronunciation: [bili mɔ̃tiɲi]; Picard: Bili-Montini) is a commune in the Pas-de-Calais department in the Hauts-de-France region in northern France.

== Geography ==
An ex-coalmining industrial town situated just 4 miles (6.4 km) east of the centre of Lens at the junction of the N43 and D46 roads. The coal lasted just over 100 years, the last pits closing in the 1960s.

== Population ==
Historical population
Year	Pop.	±% p.a.
1968	10,077	—
1975	8,834	−1.86%
1982	7,682	−1.98%
1990	8,126	+0.70%
1999	8,396	+0.36%
2007	7,964	−0.66%
2012	8,284	+0.79%
2017	8,150	−0.33%
2023	7,937	−0.44%
Source: INSEE

== Sights ==
- The church of St. Martin, dating from the nineteenth century.
- The Commonwealth War Graves Commission cemetery.

== History ==
The history of the area remains marked by the Courrières mine disaster which resulted in 1,099 casualties on 10 March 1906 in the area of the communes of Billy-Montigny, Méricourt and Sallaumines.

== Personalities ==
- Georges Lech and Bernard Lech, footballers
- ZywOo, professional Counter-Strike player

== International relations ==
The commune is twinned with:

- Trzebinia, Poland
- Reggello, Italy
- Bonen, Germany

== See also ==
- Communes of the Pas-de-Calais department
