= Fouquières-lès-Lens =

- Commune
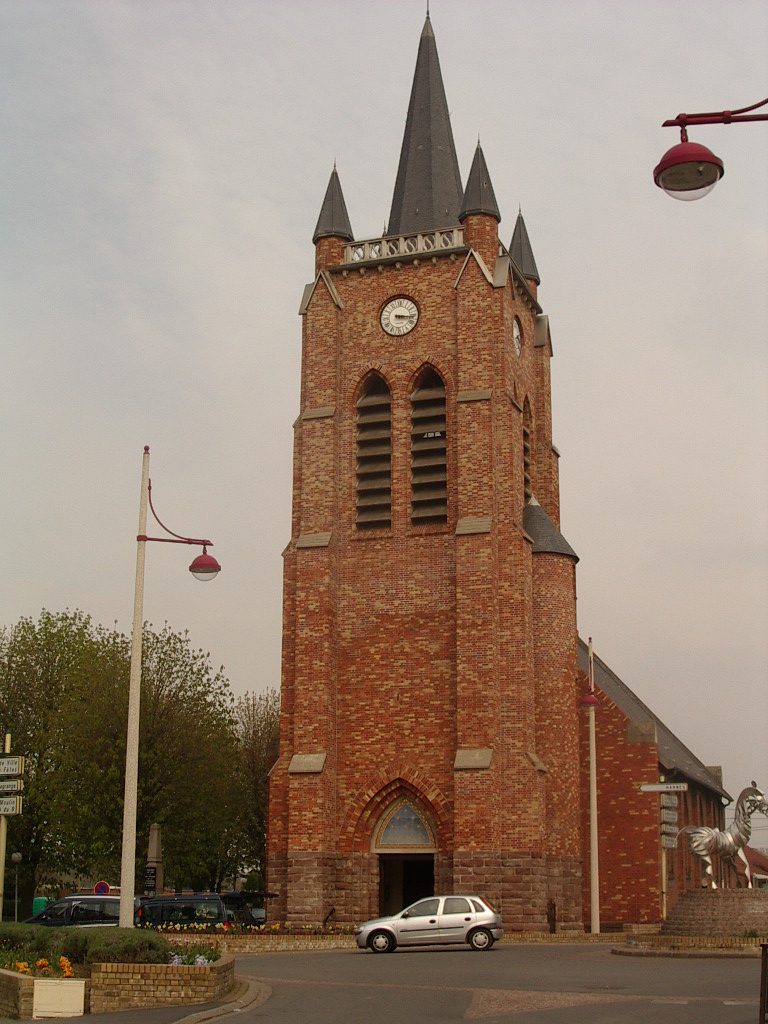
- The church of Fouquières-lès-Lens

- Coat of arms
- Location of Fouquières-lès-Lens
- Location within France Location within Hauts-de-France
- Coordinates: 50°25′46″N 2°54′49″E
- Country: France
- Region: Hauts-de-France
- Department: Pas-de-Calais
- Arrondissement: Lens
- Canton: Harnes
- Intercommunality: CA Lens-Liévin

Government
  - Mayor (2020–2026): Donata Hochart
- Area^{1}: 4.14 km^{2} (1.60 sq mi)
- Elevation: 49 m (161 ft)
- Highest elevation: 43 m (141 ft)
- Lowest elevation: 22 m (72 ft)
- Population (2023): 6,087
  - Density: 1,470/km^{2} (3,810/sq mi)
- Time zone: UTC+01:00 (CET)
  - Summer (DST): UTC+02:00 (CEST)
- INSEE/Postal code: 62351 /62740
- ^{1} French Land Register data, which excludes lakes, ponds, glaciers > 1 km^{2} (0.386 sq mi or 247 acres) and river estuaries.

Fouquières-lès-Lens (French pronunciation: [fukjɛʁ lɛ lɑ̃s], literally Fouquières near Lens) is a commune in the Pas-de-Calais department in the Hauts-de-France region of France.

== Geography ==
An ex-coalmining town situated some 5 miles (8.0 km) east of Lens, at the junction of the D46 and the A21 autoroute.

== Population ==
Historical population
Year	Pop.	±% p.a.
1968	8,801	—
1975	7,758	−1.79%
1982	7,550	−0.39%
1990	7,038	−0.87%
1999	6,898	−0.22%
2007	6,532	−0.68%
2012	6,521	−0.03%
2017	6,362	−0.49%
2023	6,087	−0.73%
Source: INSEE

== Places of interest ==
- The church of St.Vaast, rebuilt, as was most of the village, after the First World War.
- The war memorial.

== See also ==
- Communes of the Pas-de-Calais department
