= Drocourt, Pas-de-Calais =

Drocourt
- Commune
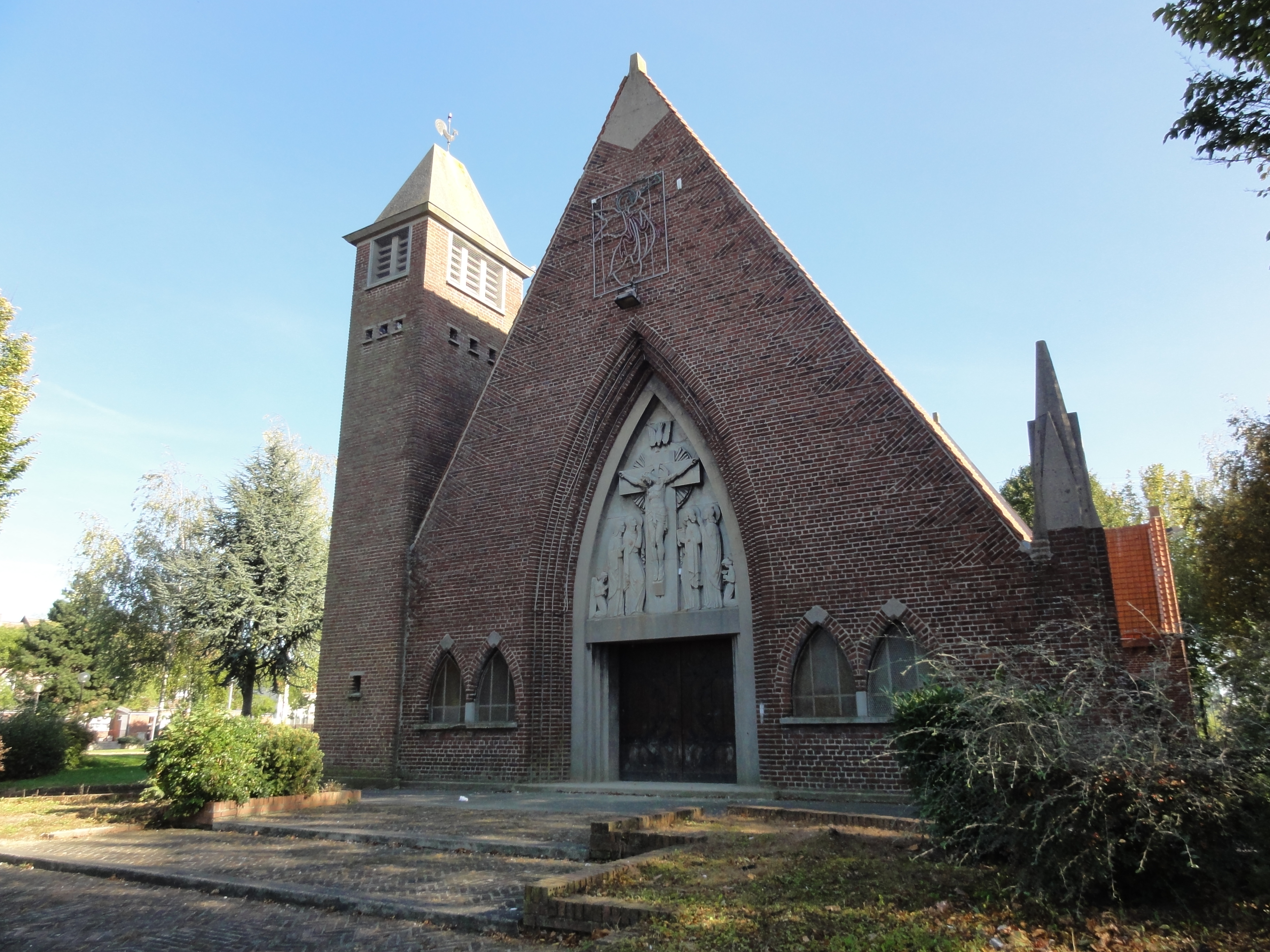
- The church of Drocourt

- Coat of arms
- Location of Drocourt
- Location within France Location within Hauts-de-France
- Coordinates: 50°23′31″N 2°55′39″E
- Country: France
- Region: Hauts-de-France
- Department: Pas-de-Calais
- Arrondissement: Lens
- Canton: Hénin-Beaumont-2
- Intercommunality: CA Hénin-Carvin

Government
  - Mayor (2020–2026): Bernard Czerwinski
- Area^{1}: 3.4 km^{2} (1.3 sq mi)
- Elevation: 41 m (135 ft)
- Highest elevation: 68 m (223 ft)
- Lowest elevation: 39 m (128 ft)
- Population (2023): 2,939
  - Density: 860/km^{2} (2,200/sq mi)
- Time zone: UTC+01:00 (CET)
  - Summer (DST): UTC+02:00 (CEST)
- INSEE/Postal code: 62277 /62320
- ^{1} French Land Register data, which excludes lakes, ponds, glaciers > 1 km^{2} (0.386 sq mi or 247 acres) and river estuaries.

Drocourt (French pronunciation: [dʁɔkuʁ]) is a commune in the Pas-de-Calais department in the Hauts-de-France region of France.

== Geography ==
An ex-coalmining commune, now a light industrial and farming town, situated some 6 miles (9.7 km) southeast of Lens, at the junction of the D919, D40 and D47 roads.

== Population ==
Historical population
Year	Pop.	±% p.a.
1968	2,361	—
1975	3,035	+3.65%
1982	3,458	+1.88%
1990	3,341	−0.43%
1999	3,104	−0.81%
2007	2,989	−0.47%
2012	2,978	−0.07%
2017	2,936	−0.28%
2023	2,939	+0.02%
Source: INSEE

== Places of interest ==
- The churches of St.Leger and of St. Barbe, both dating from the twentieth century.

== International relations ==
Drocourt is twinned with:

- Tokarnia, Poland

== See also ==
- Communes of the Pas-de-Calais department
