= Cantons of the Pas-de-Calais department =

The following is a list of the 39 cantons of the Pas-de-Calais department, in France, following the French canton reorganisation which came into effect in March 2015:

- Aire-sur-la-Lys
- Arras-1
- Arras-2
- Arras-3
- Auchel
- Auxi-le-Château
- Avesnes-le-Comte
- Avion
- Bapaume
- Berck
- Béthune
- Beuvry
- Boulogne-sur-Mer-1
- Boulogne-sur-Mer-2
- Brebières
- Bruay-la-Buissière
- Bully-les-Mines
- Calais-1
- Calais-2
- Calais-3
- Carvin
- Desvres
- Douvrin
- Étaples
- Fruges
- Harnes
- Hénin-Beaumont-1
- Hénin-Beaumont-2
- Lens
- Liévin
- Lillers
- Longuenesse
- Lumbres
- Marck
- Nœux-les-Mines
- Outreau
- Saint-Omer
- Saint-Pol-sur-Ternoise
- Wingles
