= Polish immigration to the Nord-Pas-de-Calais coalfield =

20th-century Polish immigration to France

Polish immigration to the Nord-Pas-de-Calais coalfield took place before and especially after the First World War. It took place mainly in the second half of the 1920s, when the mines, drowned in October and November 1918 by the Germans at the end of the war, were once again usable. Half of the Polish immigrants had initially entered Germany as Westphalian miners.

Several thousand were sent home in the five years following the 1929 crash, sometimes for strike action. A number of them were killed in the International Brigades, during the Spanish Civil War and then in the Resistance, particularly during the Patriotic Strike of the 100,000 miners of Nord-Pas-de-Calais in May–June 1941.

Between 1945 and 1949, when the battle for coal was being waged to combat electricity shortages in several countries, 62,000 Poles from France; returned to Poland via a "reemigracja", first spontaneous and then organized, including 5,000 miners from Nord-Pas-de-Calais, many of them communists who wanted to rebuild their country, despite or because of the arrival in power of the socialist government set up by the Soviet Union in September 1944.

== Before the First World War ==
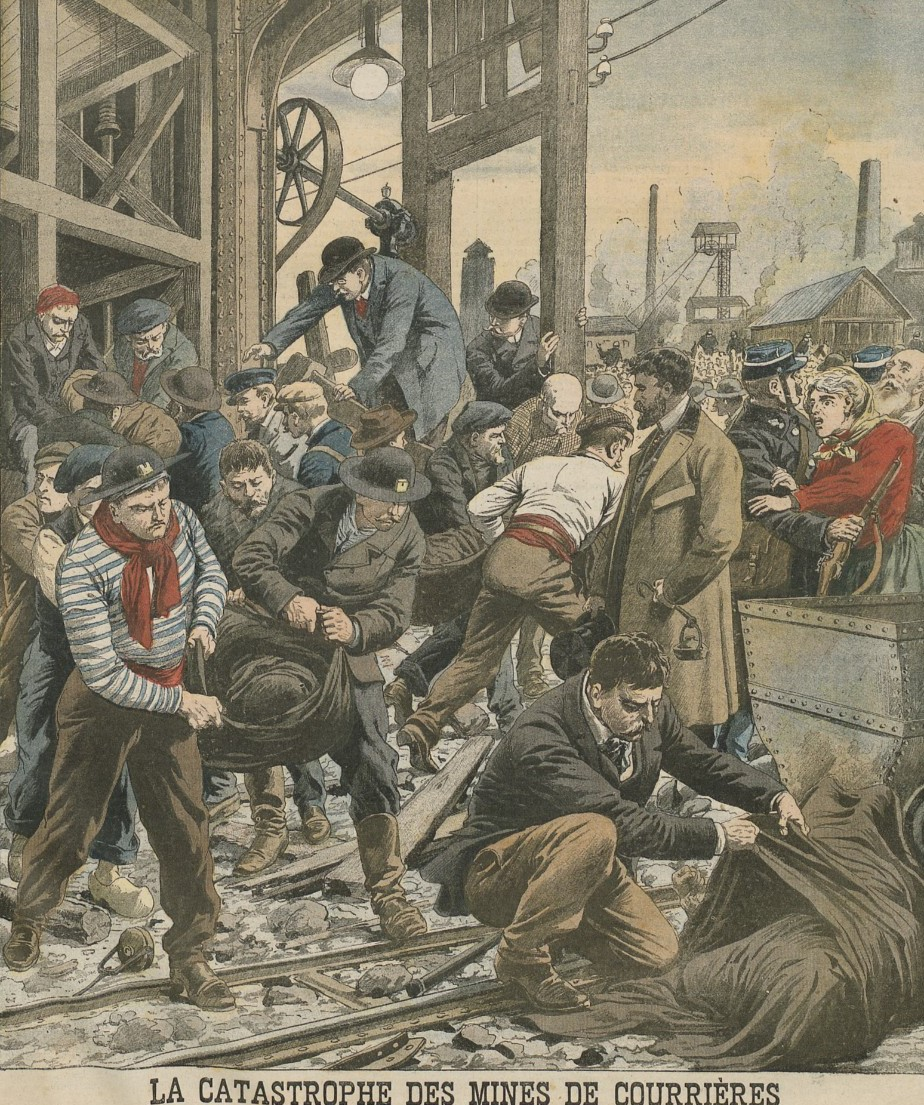
The Courrières mine disaster illustrated by Le Petit Journal.

=== The consequences of the Courrières mine disaster ===
Between 1900 and 1913, the mines of Lorraine had been under German control since 1871, when the region was annexed by the German Empire, and only a third of French miners were still housed in the corons since the workforce came from Belgium for the Nord département, and from neighboring villages for the Pas-de-Calais.

French coal production rose by a quarter in the first decade of the century, from 33 to 40 million tonnes. Productivity was still low: only one tonne per man per day in 1913, but the expansion of electric power created strong demand, which companies were anxious to make profitable. In 1906, the terrible Courrières mine disaster killed nearly 1,100 miners working for Compagnie de Courrières, France's leading mining company. The company first recruited 900 miners in Kabylia, followed by the first Poles in 1909 and 1910.

=== Learning to jackhammer in Germany ===
The Poles who first arrived at the Compagnie de Courrières were called Westphalian miners because they had come from the German Ruhr, where they had learned to handle the jackhammer. Among them was union leader Thomas Olszanski. On the recommendation of Polish Prince Witold Czartoryski, a shareholder in the Compagnie des Mines d'Anzin, the company also recruited 620 Westphalians. Satisfactory Westphalian miners were also recruited in Barlin, Lallaing, Guesnain, and Wallers by the Compagnie de Nœux and the Compagnie d'Aniche. At the beginning of 1913, Polish families settled in Méricourt, in the old housing estates known as "Méricourt-Coron", according to the testimony of a Polish miner of the time.

== The First World War ==
In January 1915, at the start of the First World War, the companies decided to disperse some of the "Westphalians" to the Massif Central, to Cransac in Aveyron, Roche-la-Molière and Saint-Etienne in the Loire, and Alais in the Gard. In a context of heightened patriotism, the aim was to guard against the mistrust aroused by their long stay in Germany, where many of them had even been born. Around 80 of them arrived in Cransac, Aveyron, including Thomas Olszanski from Compagnie de Courrières.

== After the First World War ==
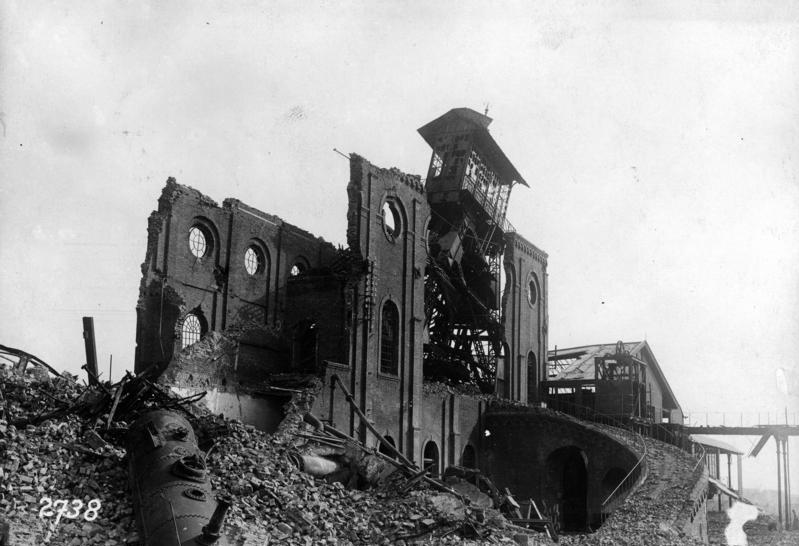
The No. 4 pit of the Lens mines in 1918. Defeated at Vimy, the Germans caused damage to most of the mining companies.

Throughout France, around two-thirds of the Poles recruited as farm workers went into industry as soon as they could, as the demand for labor was very high due to the accelerating growth of the French economy from 1924 onwards.

=== Silesian uprising and skilled miners ===
Under pressure from the Allies, Germany gave Westphalians of Polish origin the option of Polish nationality from 1919, enabling them to return to Poland. The trend in the 19th century was to "Germanize", although this was mitigated by the German Empire from 1887 onwards. The Westphalians who returned, whose numbers are not well known, discovered very high unemployment and the crushing of the Silesian uprising by 21,000 Reichswehr soldiers in the summer of 1919. Faced with the beginnings of the Polish-Soviet War, they often preferred to leave again, but for France, which had set out to seduce them, via Myslowice and Toul, where Paris had set up an immigration office, rather than return to Germany, where the social situation was very tense, leading in March 1920 to the Ruhr uprising.

By the end of 1919, the French Ministry of Labor had opened a "Mission française de la Main d'œuvre" in Warsaw, which organized the first convoy from Poland to France on 14 December 1919. It soon had to move to Czestochowa, against the backdrop of the Polish-Soviet War, which began on 14 February 1920, with a first conflict near Biaroza, in Belarus. Employers tried to avoid hiring workers from the Dąbrowa Górnicza mining basin in the Silesian Voivodeship, where numerous strikes had accompanied the attempted Russian Revolution of 1905. However, the labor shortage meant that many workers were hired from 1923 onwards, especially as they had professional credentials. Competence criteria were introduced. At Myslowice, on the outskirts of Katowice in Silesia, applicants were only accepted if they had two years of experience in the underground, including eight months in coal mining.

=== Spartakist uprisings in Germany ===
French mining companies increased their efforts to recruit in Germany, a country defeated by the world war, where mining activity was in any case made difficult by the confrontations in the Ruhr, which caused 2,400 deaths, in addition to 35,600 political assassinations. In response, from 6 April, France temporarily occupied Frankfurt and Darmstadt. In March 1921, the Allies decided to occupy Duisburg and Düsseldorf. In March 1922, the Coal Committee opened an office in Duisburg, in the Ruhr, and it was in the summer of 1922 that the largest number of Polish miners arrived in Pas-de-Calais.

=== A settlement shaped by wartime destruction ===
Bruay-en-Artois became known as the "Polish capital" or "Czestochowa" and Poles became the majority, sometimes accounting for as much as 70% of the population in the western part of the coalfield: Sallaumines, Aniche, Ostricourt, Libercourt.

The Compagnie de Bruay was the only one immediately operational. It had mined 4.5 million tonnes in 1917, compared with two million in 1914, and was once again faced with a severe productivity constraint. In September 1920, it succeeded in recruiting Westphalian miners accustomed to using jackhammers in the German Ruhr: initially, 80 came to Marles-les-Mines, and 14 to Bruay, the companies hoping that they would then quickly convince their compatriots in the Ruhr to follow them.

After the Franco-Polish governmental conference of 5 June 1920, the Compagnie de Bruay built 1,600 houses for them in three years. They came with their families demanding high-quality housing and set up some forty associations in Bruay. In Marles-les-Mines, 3,000 houses were built by the Compagnie des Mines de Marles to accommodate the "Westphalians". In neighboring Lapugnoy, other Poles arrived from Poland, without family or furniture, by boat and then by train, via the Chocques station, this time to be installed in barracks. Some left because of the poor reception conditions, others after a one-year trial period.

=== Arrivals mainly in the mid-1920s ===
Around 800 Poles arrived in France in the first convoy on 14 December 1919. This was followed by 2,500 families in May 1922. But it was not until 1923–1924 that the first arrivals took place, as the reconstruction of the mines after the 1914–1918 war took five years.

By 1931, some 30,000 Polish families, or 200,000 people were living in the Nord-Pas-de-Calais coalfield. In the Nord département, 60.4% of Polish immigrants worked in the mines, and 90% in the Pas-de-Calais.

The mid-1920s also saw the widespread use of heavy mining machinery (jackhammers, then cutters), with no attempt to neutralize the dust, which led to a higher incidence of silicosis. Overall, French companies found it difficult to recruit in Poland, even though in March 1922 Poles were rounded up in Poznań and sent to Sallaumines, where they made up 40% of the population.

Years (North)	Total number of French miners	Total number of Polish miners	Basin production (millions of tonnes)
December 1921	64 000 (83%)	3 600 (5%)	10,9
December 1923	67 000 (61%)	32 000 (29%)	15,2
December 1926	78 000 (60%)	42 000 (32%)	24

In all, between 100,000 and 130,000 Westphalian miners arrived in France, including their families.

=== Difficulties and social integration ===
The number of Westphalian miners of Polish origin increased a hundredfold in the decade following the First World War, but they were not the only Poles to settle in the Nord-Pas-de-Calais coalfield. Employers also recruited them directly from Poland, where some of the "Westphalians" had returned in 1919, but were unable to find work immediately because the Polish mines were in poor condition. There were also young, inexperienced miners from Poznań, whom some Frenchmen sometimes blamed for lowering shift yields.

At the turn of the century, those who came from Germany were envied for the jobs they had obtained thanks to their qualifications. In Sallaumines, between 1921 and 1926, around 30 Poles improvised as bakers, butchers, and grocers, rising to 36 by 1931, and 46 by 1936. In Bruay-en-Artois, one in three Polish miners' wives ran a store or a drinking establishment. The companies kept a watchful eye on them to "monitor their political development and union activity", as many had been union members in the German Ruhr region, but they were unable to prevent it: despite jealousies, integration was achieved through political parties and unions.

=== Redundancies during the Great Depression of the 1930s ===
The crash of 1929 triggered the economic crisis of the 1930s. Initially, between 1930 and 1933, Polish miners were laid off for 5 to 10 days a month, depending on the coalfield.

From 1934 onwards, the dismissals accelerated. They were used to intimidate. Often, an expulsion bill was discovered by the miner on the way up, "the famous bill that scared everyone", remembers Jean Wroblewsky, a former miner and former mayor of Marles-les-Mines. In 1934 alone, the coal companies chartered 17 special trains to take their Polish workers back to the Belgian border. Between 1933 and 1936, some 20,000 Poles, either from Poznań or via the Ruhr, had to leave France, under very brutal conditions: only 48 hours to get ready, with a maximum of 30 kilos of luggage. Many had to give up everything in their homes and keep only the essentials.

=== The Gierek-Olszanski affair ===
In 1932, union leader Thomas Olszanski, a naturalized French citizen since 1922, who contributed to one of the two Polish-language union newspapers, Robotnik Polski ("The Polish Worker"), was stripped of his French citizenship, in the wake of his commitment to and stance in defense of the working class. A support committee for Thomas Olszanski was formed by André Malraux, Paul Nizan, Henri Barbusse, Eugène Dabit, Paul Signac, Jean and André Lurçat and Georges Friedmann.

Having exhausted his appeals, he was expelled from France in 1934, at the same time as another Polish trade unionist, Edward Gierek, who would later become Prime Minister of Poland. After returning to Belgium in 1937, Gierek returned to Poland in 1948, where he became the "strong man" of Silesia and then number one of the Polish United Workers' Party (PZPR), after the Baltic events of December 1970, initiating links with the USA and West Germany, before being ousted by General Jaruzelski's 1981 Martial law instituting a state of siege to put an end to the growing role of the Solidarność trade union. His visit to France from 2 to 6 October 1972 was hailed by the press, even though he was still banned from the country, with an interpreter in miner's clothing and the honors of French President Georges Pompidou.

=== Refugees from the 1939 debacle ===
A new wave of Polish refugees, mainly military personnel fleeing from Hungary, Romania, and the Baltic states, flocked to France, and not just to the north of the country, at the time of the September 1939 defeat and formed part of the Polish Army in the Battle of France. Of a total of 34,000 Poles who had taken refuge in France and Great Britain by mid-June 1939, around 85%, or nearly 30,000, remained in France.

A Franco-Polish agreement was signed on 9 September 1939, and later expanded: what was to be a simple military division became the Polish Army in France. In June 1940, when the French were defeated, the Polish Armed Forces in the West numbered 84,461 men, including over 75,000 in France.

A quarter of these Polish soldiers (around 20,000) managed to retreat to Great Britain with the Polish government in exile in London. The units that remained in France were disbanded, and their fighters tried, often unsuccessfully, to make their way to London. From the very start of the Polish Resistance in France, which was less frequently victimized by the Gestapo because it was more experienced overall, two trends emerged: one linked to the Polish government in London, the other to workers' organizations, including the French Communist Party (PCF).

The Polish embassy and consulates in France, initially evacuated to Lisbon, took charge on their return of demobilizing some of them in some twenty "labor companies" under Polish command, mainly in the "free zone" of southern France, supervised by General Franciszek Kleeberg, appointed head of the "Polish Armed Forces in France" by General Ladislas Sikorski, Minister-president. These were the foreign workers' groups of the Vichy regime, created by the law of 27 September 1940, which set up internment camps and succeeded the foreign workers' companies, tasked with providing cheap labor: heavy work, mining, major works, agriculture, and forestry but which also provided semi-legal material aid to Polish soldiers and civilian refugees.

== The Second World War ==
=== The beginnings of war ===
When the German occupation of the Nord-Pas-de-Calais coalfield began in July 1940, Polish political, cultural, and religious associations had to suspend their activities.

Many Poles had joined the Polish army before being taken prisoner in Germany, and as early as the summer of 1940, the first clandestine combat organizations bringing together Poles were created: the Polish-language sections of the PCF, which from the end of 1941 would be integrated into the MOI (Main-d'Œuvre Immigrée) branch of the Francs-Tireurs et Partisans. They suffered harsh repression. Most of the arrests of Polish resistance fighters were carried out by officers of the Renseignements Généraux of the French police, who had spied on their population in the pre-war years.

=== Strike of May–June 1941 ===
Polish miners then took part en masse in the patriotic strike of one hundred thousand miners in Nord-Pas-de-Calais in May–June 1941 which was the largest strike of the war in occupied Europe and the longest, lasting from 27 May to 10 June 1941, throughout Nord-Pas-de-Calais region and its coalfield.

Young Poles formed the military and militant backbone of the group, as many of the youngest had been at the origin of the small armed groups of the Special Organization in the Pas-de-Calais department in the summer of 1940. Their mission was to protect the miners responsible for spreading the strike message from mine to mine. Polish militants were particularly hard hit by repression in the camps to which they were deported. In the Mauthausen concentration camp, where they were most numerous, their compatriots did not support them because they were associated with the Popular Front, suspected of having contributed to Poland's situation and the German-Soviet pact of 1939.

=== German import of prisoners of war ===
From 1942 onwards, the German occupying forces deported several thousand Ukrainian civilians and Soviet prisoners of war to the Nord-Pas-de-Calais region to boost coal production, which had continued to decline. With this in mind, a prisoner-of-war camp was set up at Marles-les-Mines, at the foot of the slag heap at shaft number 5.

The Poles' knowledge of Russian and French facilitated contacts between Soviet nationals and the FTPF, as well as their escapes. By early 1944, the total number of Polish "language groups" in the MOI had risen to 1,370 members, then to around 2,500 by September 1944, according to written reports. Some commanded multi-national detachments, such as the 35th Brigade of the FTP-MOI, led in the South-West by Jan Gerhard and Marcel Langer.

On 15 March 1942, to counter the Polish resistance, German propaganda created an association in Douai, the "Communauté culturelle des Allemands d'origine du Nord de la France" headed by a man called "Muller", of the Kreiskommandantur, which included a majority of miners of Polish origin, notably Westphalian miners who had worked in the Ruhr and those from Poznań and Silesia, which were German before Poland gained its independence in November 1918. It also recruited Flemings, Ukrainians, and Czechoslovaks. In September 1943, it claimed 5,500 members. Its leadership was entrusted to a German from the Douai Kommandantur.

=== Operations in 1943 ===
On 6 September 1941, at the request of Consul General Aleksander Kawałkowski, Poles in France were called upon to echo the founding in southern France of an organization dependent on the Polish government in exile in London, the POWN-W, commanded by Colonel Daniel Zdrojewski and linked in London with General Marian Kukiel and the French Resistance. In 1943, this resistance organization claimed some 4,000 members.

In the summer of 1943, the Polish authorities in London, in liaison with the British secret services, decided to launch the main operations under the code names of Monica (or Monika), Monique-bas (in the free zone), and Monique-haut (in the occupied zone), and then to develop a more general intelligence plan: this was Operation Bardsea, entrusted to the Polish Ministry of National Defense (MON).

Lieutenant-Colonel Antoni Zdrojewski parachuted into France to head the special "Monique-W" network, responsible for executing the plan. The operation provided the Allies with data on 120 German weapons launching pads, helping to destroy 82 of them.

But on 20 March 1944, the Polish government-in-exile issued a directive instructing the POWN to avoid "any interference with the French Resistance and Communist movements". Despite this, on 29 May 1944, Daniel Zdrojewski and Jacques Chaban-Delmas agreed to place the fighting units under the tactical command of the Forces françaises de l'intérieur.

=== Arrests in June 1944 ===
In June 1944, Polish resistance fighters in the Nord-Pas-de-Calais coalfield were arrested in large numbers, following in the footsteps of those in southern France and Paris. Among those arrested was Jerzy Paczkowski, later executed in Hamburg-Neuengamme.

Polish resistance fighters were also active in other regions. The Mario group, in German-annexed Lorraine, was studied by Pierre Schild. According to him, out of 900 active members, 30% were non-French, including 1/3 Poles, almost all of them fellow travelers or PCF activists. In Roche-la-Molière, in the Loire department, resistance was organized by chaplain Macla Kapok. In the south-east of the département, towards Ponthieu, Polish miners joined the Francs Tireurs et Partisans (FTP) maquis, where 23 Resistance fighters were killed, including the young Polish woman Thérèse Polanski, aged 19.

=== The Liberation battles ===
In the summer of 1944, when the Allied forces were no longer very far from the regional mining basin8, Polish miners took part in the liberation battles in very large numbers, according to reports in the archives8. This was partly through the creation of the Polish Patriotic Militia, which was very active in Libercourt, Marles-les-Mines, Noeux-les-Mines, and Montigny-en-Gohelle. The Poles were particularly active in Bruay-en-Artois, where seven Poles were killed. They killed 52 German soldiers, burned two tanks and took around 300 prisoners, 4 cannons, a radio transmitter, 200 rifles and machine guns and 11 machine guns but also lost at least 19 men.

Clashes also took place in La clarence, Barlin, Hersin-Coupigny, Labourse, Courrières, Hénin-Liétard, and Lens, on the Lens-Béthune road, in Armentières, Calonne-Ricouart, and Hulluch. In the town of Sallaumines, a Polish unit pursued the Germans as far as Hazebrouck. Other Poles took part in the pursuit of the Germans to the Dunkirk pocket, where they remained besieged until April 1945. In particular, they took part in the first stage of the blockade of this port.

In the Nord department, they took part in the battles to liberate Lille and Valenciennes. Further south, they made a major contribution to the liberation of Auby, a small mining commune near Douai, where they lost six men, as well as Waziers. Putting a German column to flight near Bruay-Thiers, they freed a hundred Moroccan prisoners.

Once the fighting was over, the Poles, led by commanders Boleslaw Jelen and Boleslaw Maslankiewicz, assisted by Captain Jôzef Migos, formed units in the region, stationed at Seclin, Lewarde, Montigny-en-Ostrevent, Denain, Onnaing, and Valenciennes, then transferred to the Guesnain, Hérin and Seclin barracks. However, the French military administration (Intendance) refused to recognize the soldiers' right to pay, supplies, and family assistance.

They then joined a "Polish grouping" of the French 1st Army, comprising 1,650 soldiers, as the 29th Polish Infantry Group, under the command of Major Jan Gerhard, with the 201st RPNA, in the Besançon region, Doubs.

== Returning home after the war ==
=== Migration in Silesia ===
==== The Franco-Polish agreements ====
In the years following the Liberation of France, between 1945 and 1949, some 62,000 Poles from France are said to have returned to the mother country, first through spontaneous and then organized "reemigracja", including 5,000 miners from Nord-Pas-de-Calais, many of them former resistance fighters, to answer the call of their country, which needed to be repopulated and rebuilt.

Most went to the Polish mining basin of Silesia, where the coal was produced that Poland needed to rebuild itself, as it suffered from energy and electricity shortages, like the rest of Europe. The "reemigracja" was organized by the communist authorities in Warsaw, and gave rise to a political conflict between supporters of Poland's new government and Polish anti-communist activists in France.

==== Franco-Polish memory ====
Poles arriving from France then gave the streets, replacing the German names, those of resistance fighters they had met in France who had fought against Nazism, according to historian Jacques Kmieciak, a specialist in this aspect of the country's history. Among them was future Polish Prime Minister Edward Gierek, who arrived in the Nord-Pas-de-Calais mining basin in 1926 and, along with trade unionist Thomas Olszanski, led the great strike of August 1934 at the Compagnie des mines de l'Escarpelle, which resulted in the expulsion of 77 trade unionists. Broneslaw Kania, from Fouquières-les-Lens, guillotined in 1943 by the Nazis, and Joseph Burczykowski, who died in deportation to Sachsenhausen, and whose 3 sons were shot by the Nazis, and Marcel Kolorz, a member of the PCF leadership who led miners' strikes in Upper Silesia from 1920 to 1922. He also fell in 1938 at the Battle of the Ebro, the largest battle of the Spanish Civil War, as part of one of the International Brigades, the Dombrowski Battalion, named after the Polish officer Jarosław Dombrowski who took part in the Paris Commune.

== Cultural dimension ==
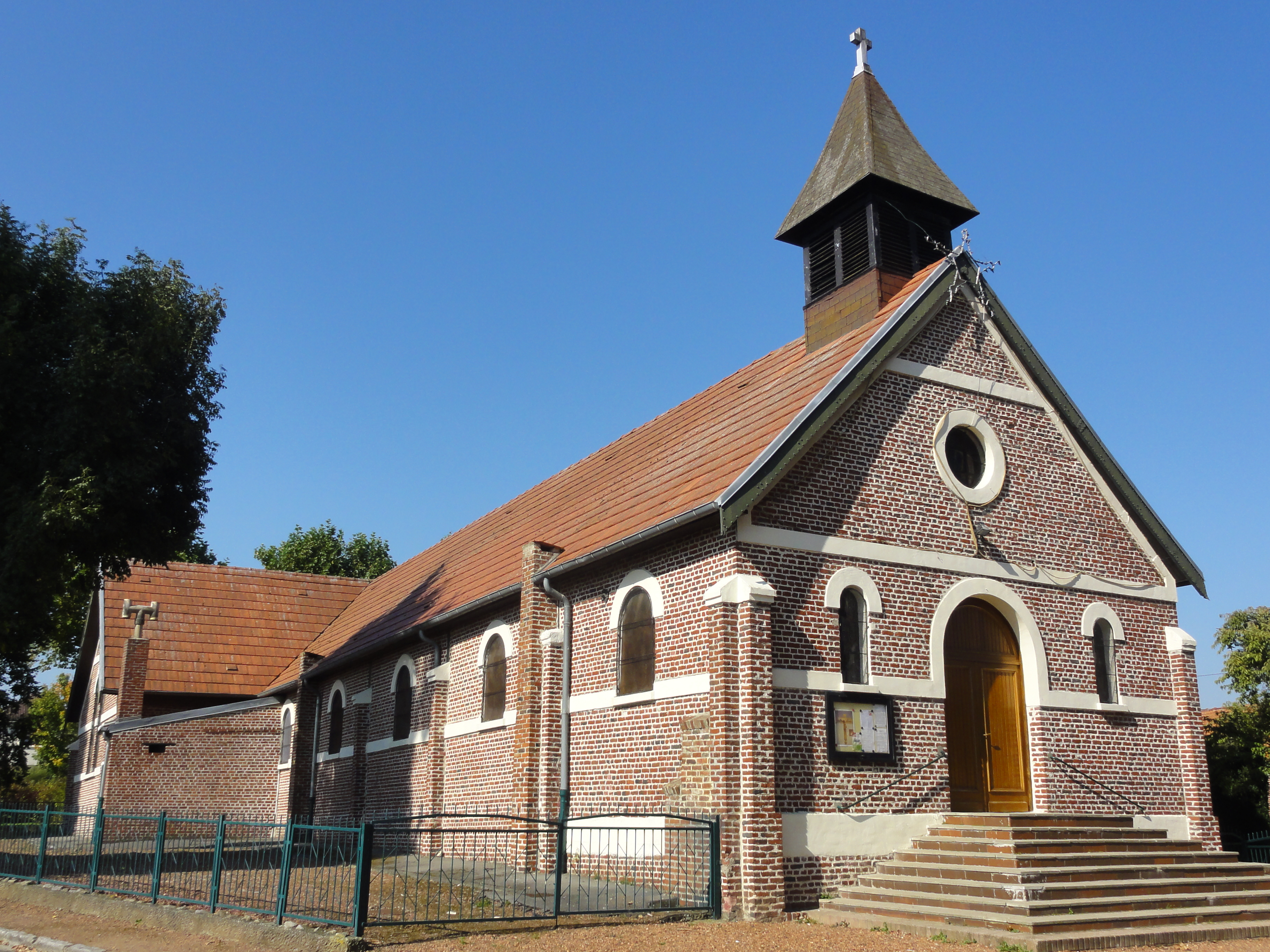
The church of Saint-Stanislas in Calonne-Ricouart, a Polish church near pit no. 2 bis – 2 ter in the Marles mines.

Polish immigration strongly influenced mining and cultural traditions in France. A "little Poland" was born in several mining towns. The proportion of Poles reached 70% in Fouquières-lès-Lens, in the area of the Compagnie des mines de Courrières, but the arrondissement of Béthune accounted for 90% of the 135,000 Poles living in the Pas-de-Calais, which itself was home to a third of France's 150,000 Poles, including families, a proportion that rises to a third if the Nord département is added.

=== Associations and religions ===
Poles in Westphalia played an important role in trade unionism and community life, as they had done in Germany in the 1890s. Some associations created in Westphalia were transferred to France, sometimes with the same people. The schoolteacher and the parish priest often came with the miners. Mining companies encouraged religious practice, as in Marles-les-Mines, where the Compagnie des Mines de Marles helped build a church. The Catholic religion, which had been discouraged in Germany, flourished freely in France, in all its dimensions. Numerous Rosary associations came into being, as did the Sainte-Barbe and Saint-Adalbert societies, the Sokół, a Polish youth movement founded in 1867, and the Strezelec (sports group).

=== Newspapers ===
The first issue of Wiarus Polski in France was published on 1 July 1924, in Lille, and printed by Le Grand Echo du Nord. Three months later, its left-wing rival Narodowiec moved to Lens in October 1924. Both titles grew very rapidly and achieved significant penetration of the Polish population. In 1926–1928, Wiarus Polski had a circulation of 10,000 but was outstripped by its left-wing rival Narodowiec, which had a circulation of 15,000. Their combined readership is estimated at 100,000. The other branch of the trade union movement, the CGT, fought back with the first issue of Prawo Ludu, another Polish-language newspaper, on 26 January 1924.

In Pas-de-Calais, the first issue of the Polish-language underground newspaper Nasz Głos ("Our Voice") was published in 1940 by Polish PCF groups, edited by Communist Józef Spira. Reports from the German police, attentive to everything that was happening in the strategic Nord-Pas-de-Calais coalfield, immediately reported the circulation of Nasz Głos among local Poles.

=== Trade unions ===
A "Polish Workers' Union" (ZRPF), which arrived with miners from Westphalia in 1924, already had around 100 sections and 10,000 members by 1926. But its existence in France was short-lived. The CGT organized a large proportion of Polish miners. However, in the early 1930s, the CFTC, a new religiously oriented French trade union founded in 1919 in the Paris region, had around fifteen Polish sections in the Nord-Pas-de-Calais mining basin.

== Chronology ==
- 1890s and 1900s: Westphalian miners emigrate from Poland to Germany;
- 1907: Courrières disaster causes 1,100 deaths and a call for foreign emigration;
- 1914: Polish immigration to the Nord-Pas-de-Calais coalfield, dispersed to other regions of France to prevent xenophobia;
- 1918: Poles from the Silesian coalfield take part in the Spartakist revolt;
- 1918: only one-fifth of the Nord-Pas-de-Calais coalfield was not flooded by the Germans when they left; Westphalian miners were called in to increase productivity;
- 1924: end of dewatering of Nord-Pas-de-Calais mines, influx of Polish labor recruited in Poland and Germany;
- 1934: economic crisis and strikes, thousands of Poles from the Nord-Pas-de-Calais mining basin sent back to Poland;
- 1936: thousands of Poles from the Nord-Pas-de-Calais coalfield join the international brigades; one-third die;
- 1939: international brigade fighters interned in southern France;
- 1939: the USSR and Hitler's Germany invade Poland;
- summer 1940: the USSR negotiates the release of some of the International Brigades;
- 1940: first actions by Polish resistance fighters in the Nord-Pas-de-Calais coalfield, including International Brigade fighters who had escaped from camps in the south of France;
- March 1941: Poles from camps in southern France who had acquired Soviet nationality were transferred to the Soviet Union, others to North Africa;
- 1942: surviving Polish resistance fighters from the Nord-Pas-de-Calais coalfield, in danger, are transferred to southern France, Paris and Poland;
- summer 1945: unofficial reemigracja begins;
- May 1946: first official reemigracja train;

== Personalities of Polish immigration ==
=== Politics and resistance ===
- Head of state Edward Gierek, future First Secretary of the Polish United Workers' Party, worked in agriculture in Haute-Saône and in the potash mines of Alsace, before moving to the Nord-Pas-de-Calais coalfield. In 1926, he worked as a miner at Fosse n° 10 of the Escarpelle mines in Leforest, then as an organizer of the successful strike in August 1934, but like 77 other trade unionists, fell victim to an expulsion decree;
- Thomas Olszanski, a militant trade unionist who wrote for Robotnik Polski, the Polish trade union newspaper for the coalfield;
- lawyer Tadeusz Oppman, Chief of Staff of the Dombrowski Battalion during the Spanish Civil War, where Bronislaw Kania and Jan Rutkowski, leaders of the great miners' strike of May–June 1941, also fought;
- Rudolf Larysz and Stefan Franciszczak, other leaders of this strike after having been resistance fighters since 1940
- the Burczykowski family (resistance fighters), whose 3 sons, resistance leaders, were killed by the Germans;
- Thomas Rabienga, CGT leader in the Nord-Pas-de-Calais coalfield and one of the Polish resistance fighters in France during the Second World War;
- Szczepan Marcinkowsko "Remy", Wladyslaw Nikiel, Czarnecki, and Jôzef Krawetkowski, who in July 1940 set up the first Polish PCF resistance group in the eastern part of the Nord department.

=== Sports ===
- Famous footballer Raymond Kopaszewski, whose paternal grandparents were miners who came from Poland in 1919 with four children;
- professional footballers Simon Blaczyk and Olivier Bogaczyk;
- Robert Budzynski, a central defender trained at RC Lens, selected for the France national team, with whom he played in the 1966 World Cup, and who later became a manager of FC Nantes.
- Szczepan Marcinkowsko "Remy", Wladyslaw Nikiel, Czarnecki, and Jôzef Krawetkowski formed the first Polish PCF resistance group in the eastern part of the Nord department in July 1940;

== See also ==
- Nord-Pas de Calais Mining Basin
- Polish immigration to the Ronchamp coal mines
- Poles in France
- Polish resistance in France during World War II

== Bibliography ==
- Frey, Yves (2003). Polonais d'Alsace : Pratiques patronales et mineurs polonais dans le bassin potassique de Haute-Alsace, 1918–1948 (in French). Presses Universitaires de Franche-Comté. ISBN 978-2-84867-012-6.
- Ponty, Janine (2005). Polonais méconnus : Histoire des travailleurs immigrés en France dans l'entre-deux-guerres (in French). Publications de la Sorbonne. ISBN 2-85944-536-6.
- Thiriet, Jean-Philippe (2001). Les Polonais dans les houillères de Ronchamp 1919-1939 (in French). Salins-les-Bains/Ronchamp, musées des techniques et cultures comtoises. ISBN 2-911484-05-3.
- Mihout, Mylène (1993). Un militant syndicaliste franco-polonais : La vie errante de Thomas Olszanski, 1886-1959 (in French). Presses Universitaires Septentrion. ISBN 978-2-85939-368-7.
- Gogolowski, Edmond (1992). "Les Polonais dans la grève des mineurs de mai-juin 1941". La grève patriotique des mineurs du Pas-de-Calais (in French). Ed. Marxisme-régions.
