= Émile Garabiol =

French engineer (1877–1961)

Émile Garabiol (1877–1961) was a French engineer.

== Early life ==
Garabiol was born in the small town of Le Grand Lemps in France. He was one of the first to attend the École Nationale ProfessionnelleENP (National Professional School) of Voiron in 1889, a small city 20 miles from Grenoble. He entered the École des Arts et Métiers in 1893, the year in which it was created. Upon his return from military service in 1899, Emile started his professional career as a draftsman. He rapidly moved to a position of greater responsibility with the Société Industrielle des Téléphones, which was very active in the competition for laying out trans-atlantic cables, as well as the Berthon Ader wall telephone, where he became chief engineer. He subsequently left to work for the Rubber Manufacturing Company in Paris, where he became director, and later, a member of the board. Other members included Chautard, Berthelot, Paul Painlevé and Léauté.

== Later life ==
Garabiol led a very busy social life. He taught mechanics and technology at the Association Philotechnique directed by Raymond Poincaré. He also taught evening courses at the Union of Electricians and Mechanics. In 1911, he received a Silver Medal from the French Industrial Association, and in 1913, a gold medal from the city of Ghent. He became Academy Officer in 1905, officer of public instruction in 1910, and Chevalier of the Mérite Agricole in 1913. In 1921, he received the Légion d'Honneur as chevalier. The citation read

"As teacher, rendered the most distinguished services in technical instruction. During the most critical period of the war, led the manufacturing of airplane wheels, which was crucial for the airforce".

His personal research in the engineering aspects of tire manufacturing led, in 1931, to the registration of a patent at the US patent office

In 1924, Garabiol moved to Grenoble. During World War II, he successfully hid from the Gestapo, in his own house in Corenc, from January to November 1943, Aleksander Kawalkowski, head of the P.O.W.N or Polish resistance in France during World War II, former consul of Poland in Lille, who had parachuted into the Vercors region near Grenoble, to help France fight against Germany.

Emile Garabiol died May 15, 1961, in La Tronche.

== Awards ==
Emile Garabiol received numerous honors, both from France and abroad. He was Officer of the Legion d'Honneur, Commander of the Palmes Academiques, Officer of the Merite Civique, and Officer of the Merite Polonais avec Glaives (Polish equivalent of the Legion d'Honneur).
