= Adam Broż =

Polish art historian and journalist

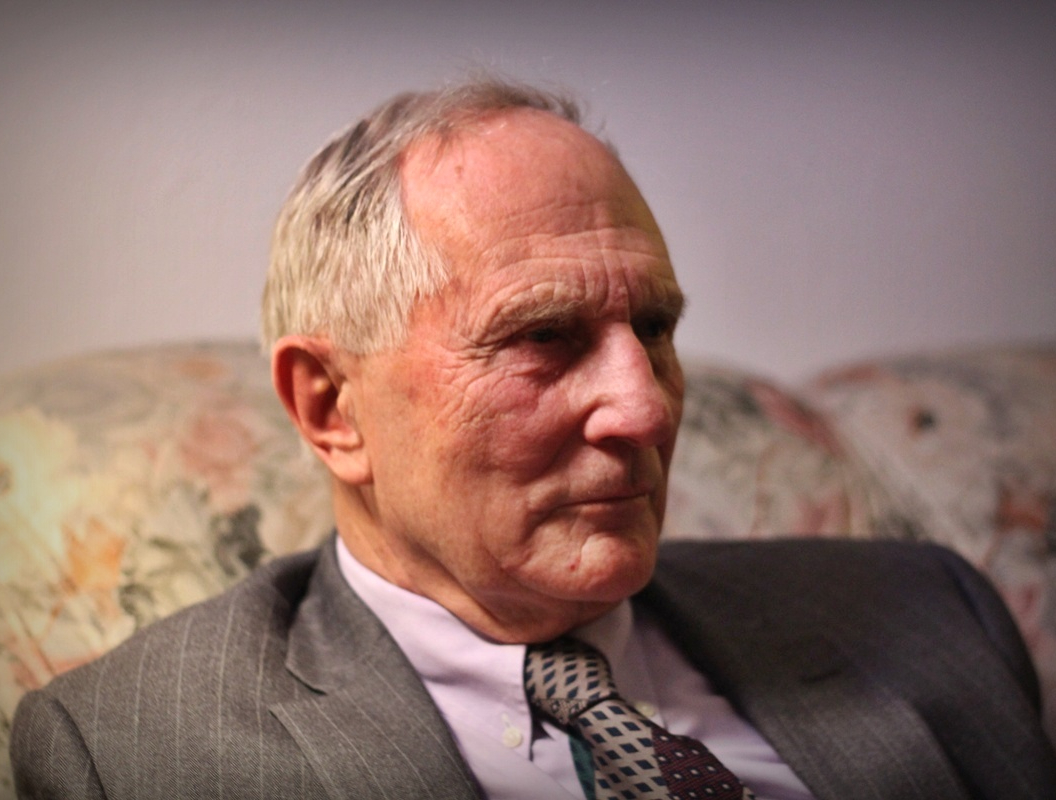
- Adam Broż, 2014
- Born: 27 January 1935 (age 91); Bielsko-Biała
- Other names: Ambros, Ambrosio
- Citizenship: Polish
- Education: Jagiellonian University
- Occupations: Art historian journalist

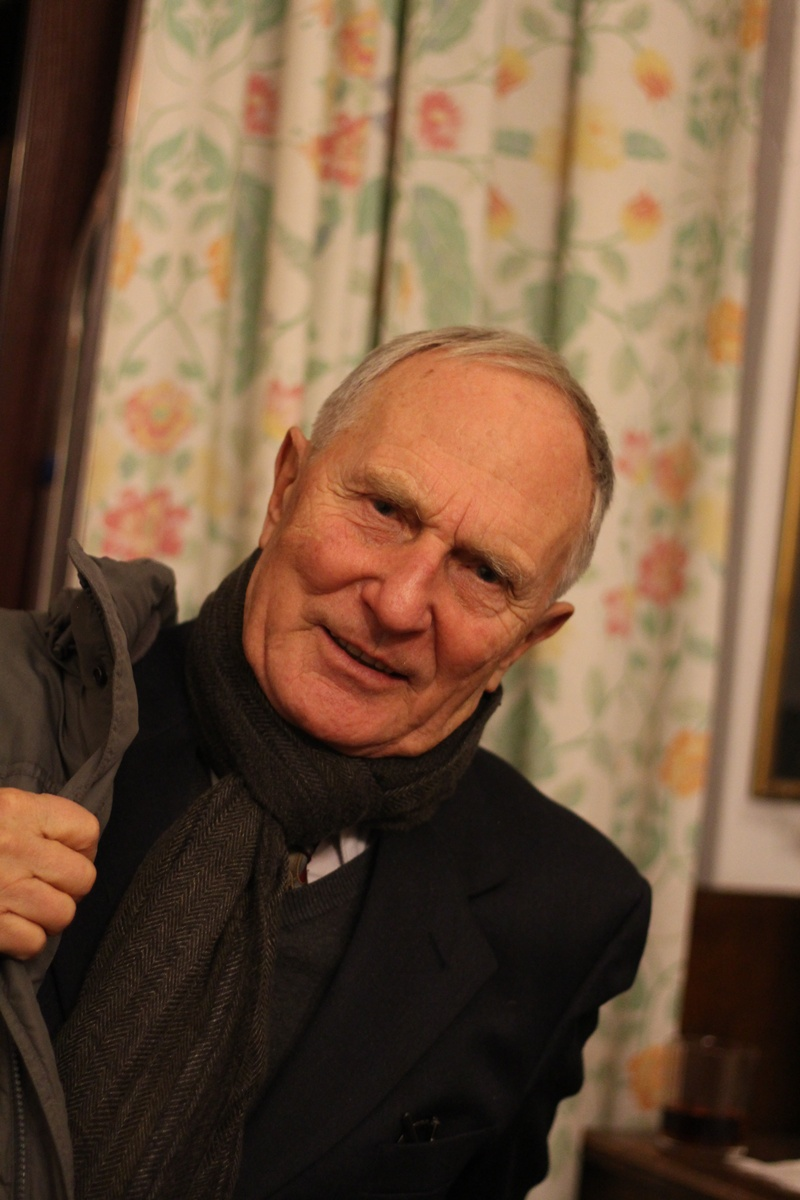
Adam Broż, 2014

Adam Broż (born 27 January 1935) is a Polish art historian and journalist, who has been living in Rome since 1965. He was the secretary of Emeryk Hutten-Czapski (1969–1979) and Karol Popiel (1970–1977), and authored several guide books on Rome.

== Biography ==
He was born in 1935 in Bielsko as the son of Stanisław Broż and Urszula née Jachimska.

He spent his youth in Kraków, where he studied art history at the Jagiellonian University (1955–1961), graduating with Master's diploma. At the same time, he developed his skills as a fine-art photographer and worked as a technical assistant at the Medical Academy in Kraków, performing scientific photography.

In 1965 he went on a one-year scholarship of the Margrave J. S. Umiastowska Roman Foundation to Rome, planning to research on the Italian Renaissance. In Rome he met and became the secretary of Emeryk Hutten-Czapski. At once, he took the position of the secretary of the Margrave J. S. Umiastowska Foundation, chair of which was Czapski. Broż performed as a double secretary of Czapski and the foundation between 1969 and 1979. Together with Emeryk Czapski, he went on a number of antiquarian journeys around Europe, mainly to Paris. In addition, in the years 1969–1977 he was the secretary of Karol Popiel.

In the years 1968–2012 he was the administrator of the Hospice of the Union of Polish Knights of Malta in Rome (the Hospice later renamed the House of Malta). Polish scholarship holders stayed there, including Jerzy Vetulani, with whom Broż established a long-term friendship. Broż also worked as a tour guide, showing Polish groups around Rome.

During his stay in Rome, Adam Broż completed a course in archeology of the city and its surroundings, and a course on paper conservation, including the conservation of books. He worked as a journalist. He published, among others in Tygodnik Powszechny, Przekrój, Kultura, Narodowiec, Nowy Dziennik, and later also in magazines Niedziela and Akcent.

He helped in obtaining Italian marbles used to rebuild the interiors of the Royal Castle in Warsaw in the 1970s and 1980s.

He authored a number of guide books on Rome: Rome and the Vatican. A Guide (Rome 1982, five editions until 1992), History of the Holy Years (Rome 1983), Rome – Holy Year 1983. Jubilee of Redemption. Papal Bull (with B. Lewandowski, Rome 1983), Rome and Its Surroundings. Tourist Guide (Warsaw 1984), Rome. Vatican. History of the Holy Years. A Guide (Rome 2001), Rome in Polish (2009, re-issued 2014) and Vatican. Pilgrim's Guide (Warsaw 2010, with Maria Betlejewska).

Over the years, Broż has acquired a number of engravings with portraits of artists, seventy-three of which were shown at the exhibition Portraits of Artists. Prints from the Collection of Adam Broż at the Royal Castle in Warsaw in February–May 2015.

In 1984, Adam Broż was elected a member of the Free Journalists Association in Munich.

He married Bożena née Sikorska, a doctor of medicine.

== Selected works ==
- Kałkowski, Tadeusz (1963). Tysiąc lat monety polskiej (in Polish). Kraków. Re-issued 1974, 1981. Photographs by Adam Broż.
- Rzym i Watykan. Przewodnik (in Polish). Plurigraf. 1982.
- Rzym – Rok Święty 1983. Jubileusz Odkupienia. Bulla papieska (in Polish). Roma: Soprani. 1983.
- Rzym i okolice. Przewodnik turystyczny (in Polish). Warszawa: Krajowa Agencja Wydawnicza. 1984.
- Rzym. Watykan. Historia lat świętych (in Polish). Plurigraf. 2001.
- "Rzeźba dekoracyjna Sukiennic krakowskich z okresu restauracji i przebudowy przez Tomasza Prylińskiego w latach 1875–1979" (PDF). Rozprawy Muzeum Narodowego W Krakowie (in Polish) (2): 41–93. 2004.
- Watykan. Przewodnik pielgrzyma (in Polish). Przewodniki Wiedzy i Życia, Hachette Livre Polska. 2006. Co-author: Maria Betlejewska.
- Rzym po polsku (in Polish). Świat Książki. 2009. Re-issued 2014.
- Broż, Adam (2014). "Emeryk Hutten Czapski, jr: wspomnienia sekretarza" (PDF). Prace Komisji Historii Nauki PAU (in Polish) (13): 117–128.
- Broż, Adam (2019). "Rzymskie spotkania z Jerzym". Wybitni uczeni we wspomnieniach. Jerzy Vetulani (PDF) (in Polish). Warszawa: Biuro Upowszechniania i Promocji Nauki PAN. pp. 185–187. ISBN 978-83-63305-73-4.

== Awards ==
- Cross pro Merito Melitensi of the Sovereign Military Order of Malta (1987);
- Commander Cross pro Merito Melitensi (2001).
