= Polish Organization for the Struggle for Independence =

World War II Polish organisation

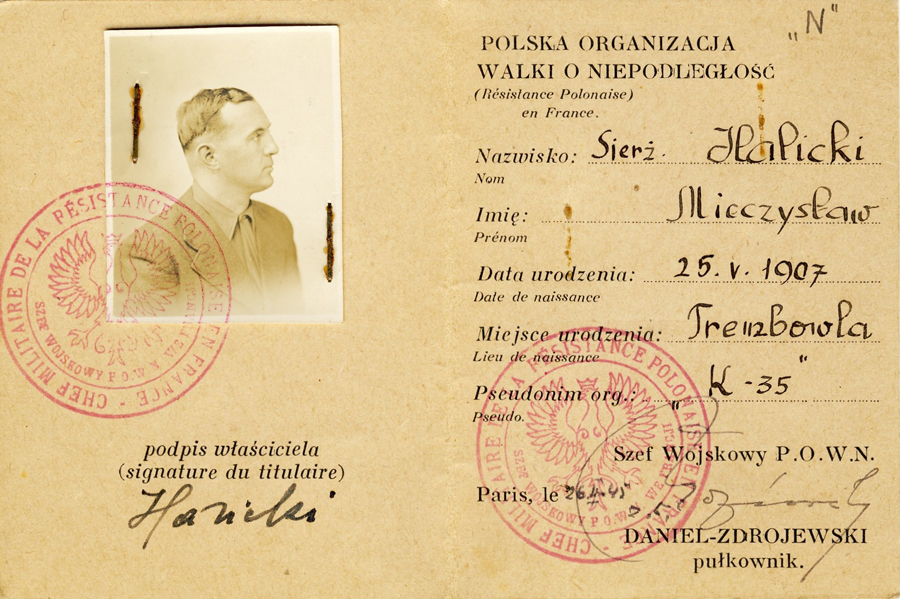
POWN ID card of Mieczysław Halicki

The Polska Organizacja Walki o Niepodległość (Polish Organization for the Struggle for Independence, French: L'Organisation polonaise de lutte pour l'indépendance ), also known as the POWN, was a Polish resistance army during World War II, It was founded in the south of France by Aleksander Kawałkowski in 1941, and conducted intelligence activities and propaganda. It operated at first primarily in France, where it was the major component of the Polish resistance in France during World War II, where it was also known by the code name "Monika" or "Monica" It was called : Monique-bas in the free zone) and Monique-haut in the occupied zone.

The armed organization was placed under the authority of Colonel Daniel Zdrojewski (known as "Justyn" in the Polish resistance), reporting to the top Polish command in London and in association with the French Resistance. On May 29, 1944, after an agreement with Jacques Chaban-Delmas, it placed its combat units under the tactical command of the French Forces of the Interior. The last official, who was responsible for the liquidation of the movement, was Czesław Bitner.
