= Étoile Civique =

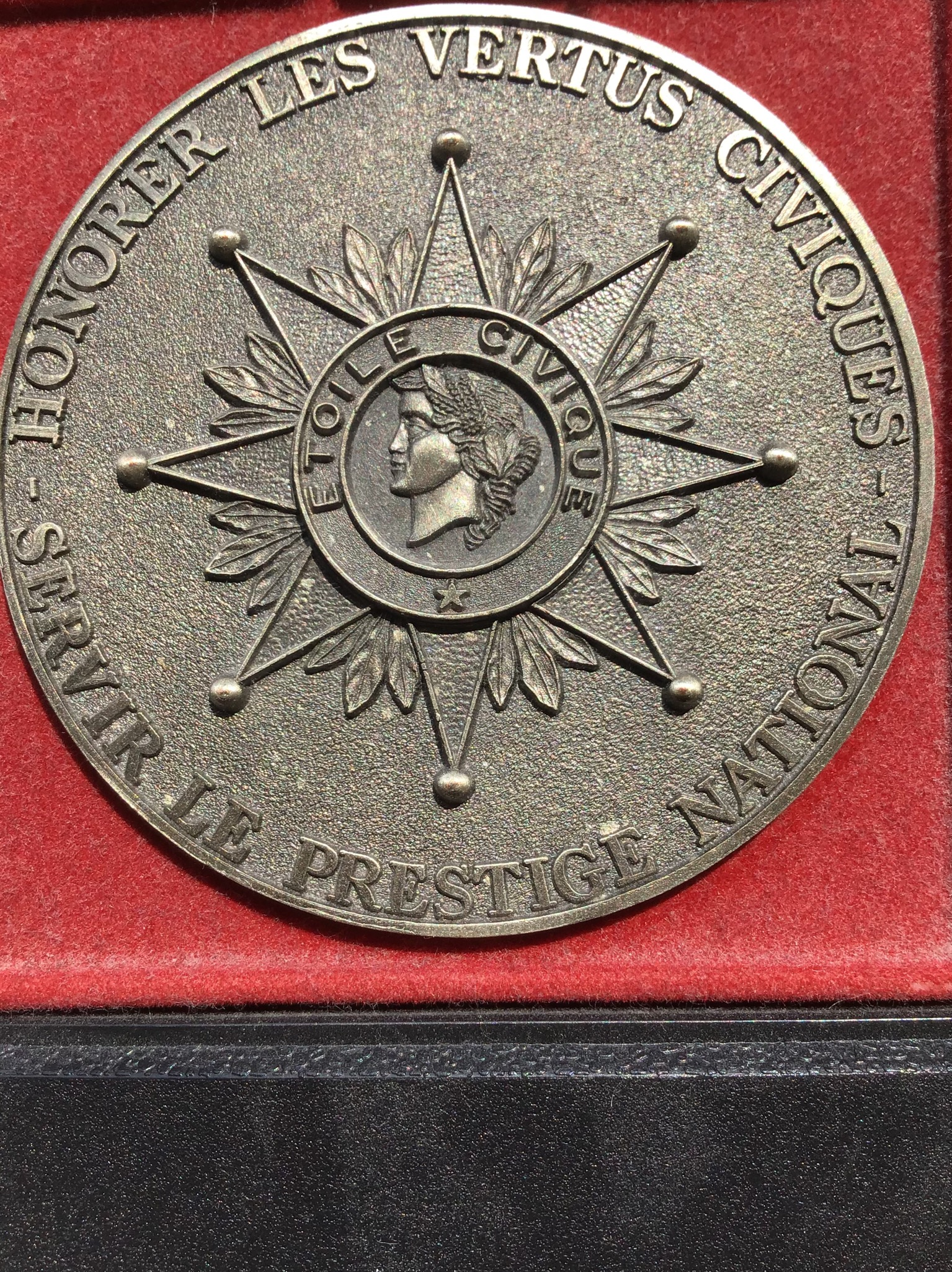
- Civic Star
- Type: Award with 4 degrees: Bronze; Silver; Silver-gilt; Gold
- Awarded for: Distinguished contributions to the community, improvement of social life, progress of Humanity, through hard work, selflessness, and sacrifice.
- Presented by: Académie Française
- Status: Currently awarded
- Established: 1930
- Website: https://www.etoilecivique.fr/

The Étoile Civique (English: Civic Star) sponsored by the Académie Française since 1968 in order to reward dedication to people and honor behavior and actions which attest this.

== History ==
Created in 1930 by the French League for Social and Philanthropic Mutual Aid and named Mérite Civique (Civic Merit), it became Étoile Civique by the Journal Officiel de la République Française n° 292, page 11672 of 12 December 1968. Sponsored by the Académie Française, It awards bravery and dedication to people and honor behavior and actions which attest this.

Distinguishing those who contribute to the enrichment of the community, improvement of social life, progress of Humanity. Particularly aimed to note individuals whose lives involve hard work, selflessness, sacrifice and who would otherwise be anonymous without the award.

The Étoile Civique has three main goals:

- Improving the lives of individuals, whatever their age, nationality, color, social condition, taking into account their moral and material interests, as part of the human family ;
- The defense of human rights, respect for the duties of citizens, by express reference to the Universal Declaration that defines them ;
- To showcase the French national prestige.

== Classes and insignia ==
This distinction has four levels : bronze Chevalier, silver Officier, silver-gilt Commandeur and gold Grand Officier.https://etoile-civique.fr/notre-histoire/ June 2026. The medal contains the following: « Honorer les vertus civiques – Servir le prestige national » (To honor the civic virtues – Serving national prestige). On the reverse, it is written : « l'Étoile Civique en reconnaissance à ... Promotion ... » (The Civic Star in recognition of ... Promotion ...). Degree with the same registration is also awarded.

== Notable recipients ==
- Maryse Bastié, French aviator ;
- Pierre Chevalier, caver and mountaineer from France ;
- Jean-Michel Dubois, French politician;
- Emile Garabiol, French engineer
- Bernard Pinet, French actor
