= France–Poland relations =

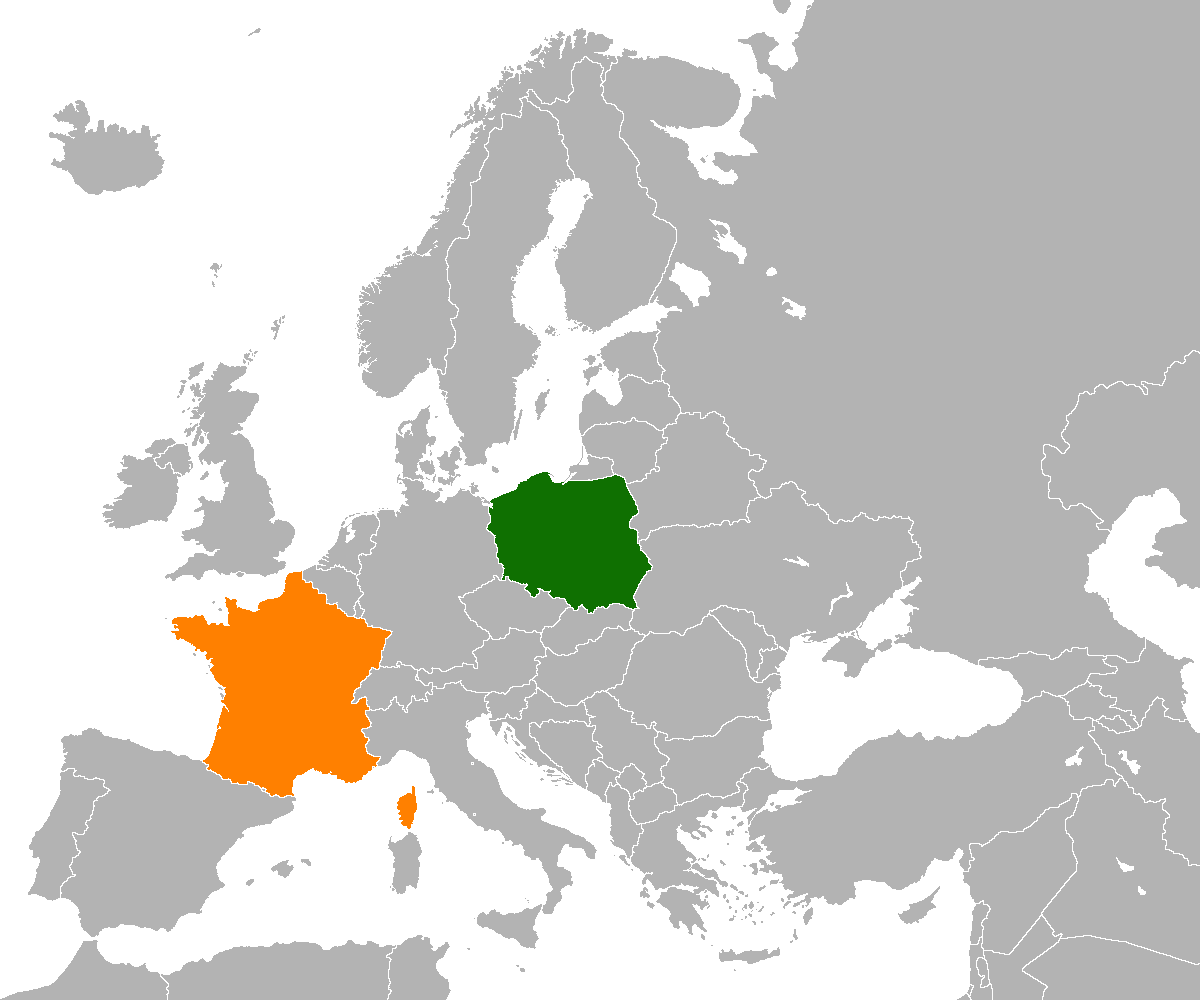
- Poland: France

France–Poland relations are relations between the nations of Poland and France, which date back several centuries.

Despite a number of cultural similarities, such as being prominent old medieval European kingdoms, belonging to Western civilization and sharing a common Catholic religion, relations between France and Poland have only become relevant since the Renaissance era. From the 16th century onward, the two countries made more frequent attempts at alliances and political cooperation, and the French and Polish ruling houses intermarried several times. Relations gained greater significance during the reign of Napoleon I, when Poles were allies of Napoleon with the hope of resurrecting their recently occupied homeland, which, however, was not achieved. The French government sympathized with Polish rebels in 1830 and 1863 but did not intervene. At that time a large Polish community settled in France.

Following the rebirth of independent Poland after World War I, Poland and France were allies during the interwar period and World War II. France declared war on Nazi Germany when it invaded Poland in 1939, but for the most part France did not engage in military action, thus it was accused of failing to act accordingly. France eventually also fell to the Germans the next year, and the Poles took part in the liberation of France in 1944. The two countries were on opposite sides during the Cold War, resulting in limited, frosty relations. Following the fall of communism in Poland in 1989, the countries once again became close allies and partners.

Currently, both countries are part of the Council of Europe, European Union, NATO, OECD and OSCE. Poland is also an observer in the Organisation internationale de la Francophonie.

== History ==
=== Before the 18th century ===
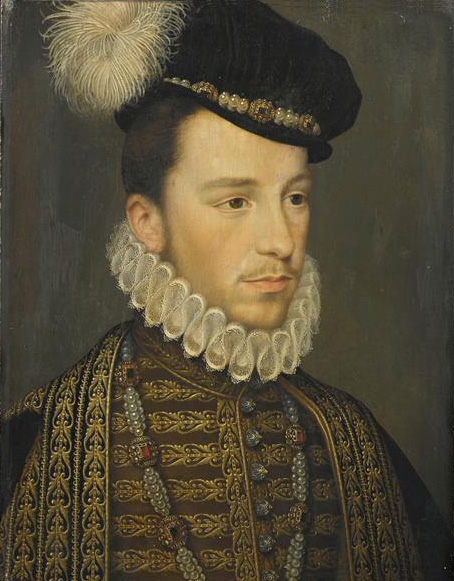
Henry III, king of Poland and king of France

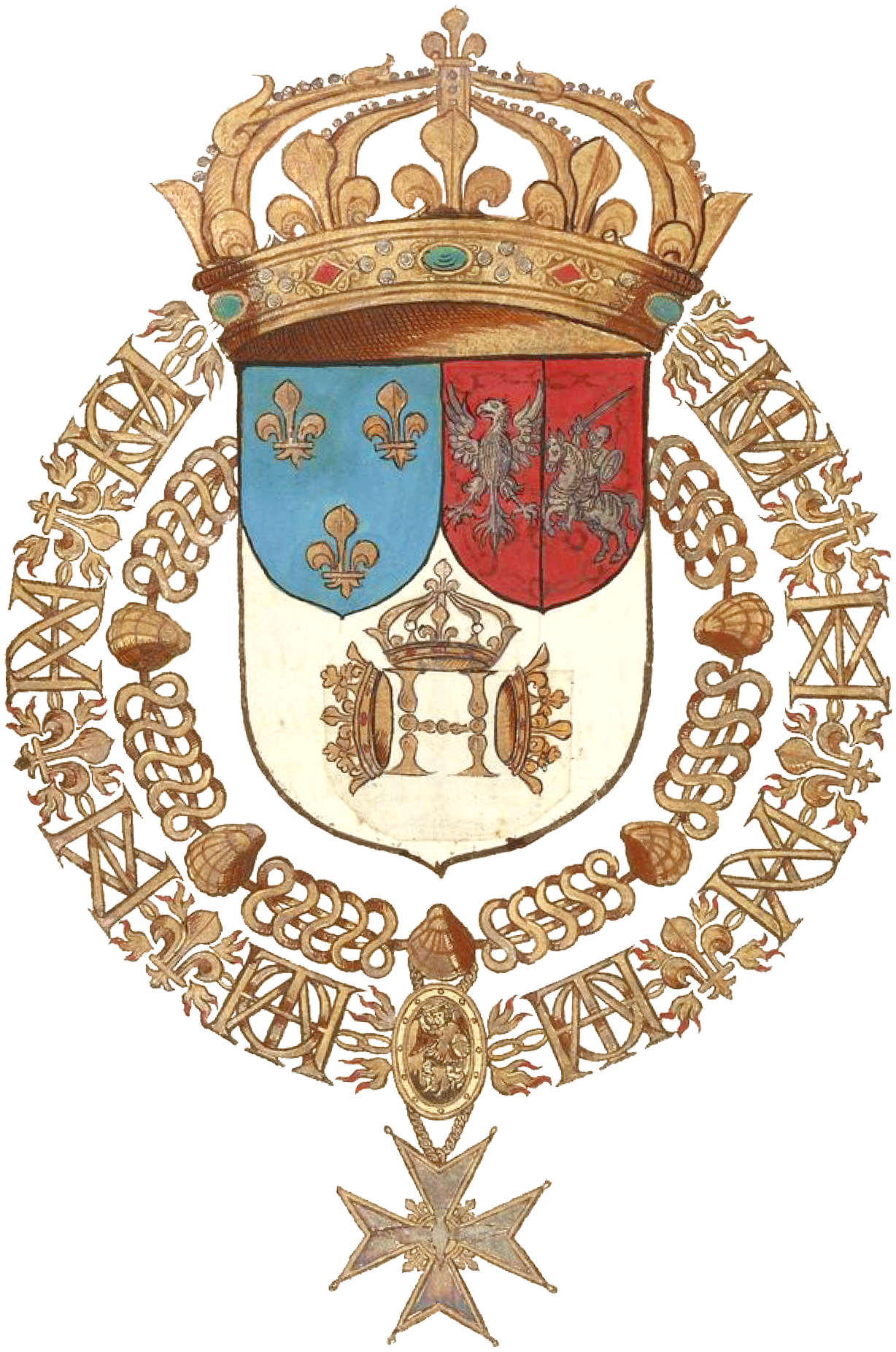
Coat of Arms of Henry III as King of Poland and King of France

Polish–French relations were nascent until the 18th century, due to geographical distance and the Polish–Lithuanian Commonwealth's lack of involvement in the wars of Western Europe. French and Polish troops fought together as part of a larger European coalition against the Ottoman invasion of Europe at the Battle of Nicopolis in 1396. In 1524, a Franco-Polish alliance was formed, however it fell through after King Francis I of France was defeated and captured by troops of Charles V of Austria and Spain in the Battle of Pavia in 1525. The first large wave of migration from France to Poland, consisting of persecuted Huguenots, occurred following the St. Bartholomew's Day massacre of 1572. In 1573, Henry III of France was elected king of Poland, but he abdicated the next year to become king of France. The French Order of the Holy Spirit was dedicated to the Holy Spirit for commemorating Henry III's succession as king of Poland (1573) and France (1574) on two Pentecosts.

Two Polish kings, Władysław IV Vasa and John II Casimir, were married to French princess Ludwika Maria Gonzaga. After his abdication in 1668, John II Casimir left for France, where he joined the Jesuits and became abbot of Saint-Germain-des-Prés in Paris. His heart was buried there. In the late 17th century, King John III Sobieski married French princess Marie Casimire Louise de la Grange d'Arquien and tried to forge a Polish–French alliance. An alliance treaty was signed in 1675, however, due to external factors it was not implemented. When French princesses were Queens consorts of Poland in the 17th century, there was a second significant wave of French migration to Poland.

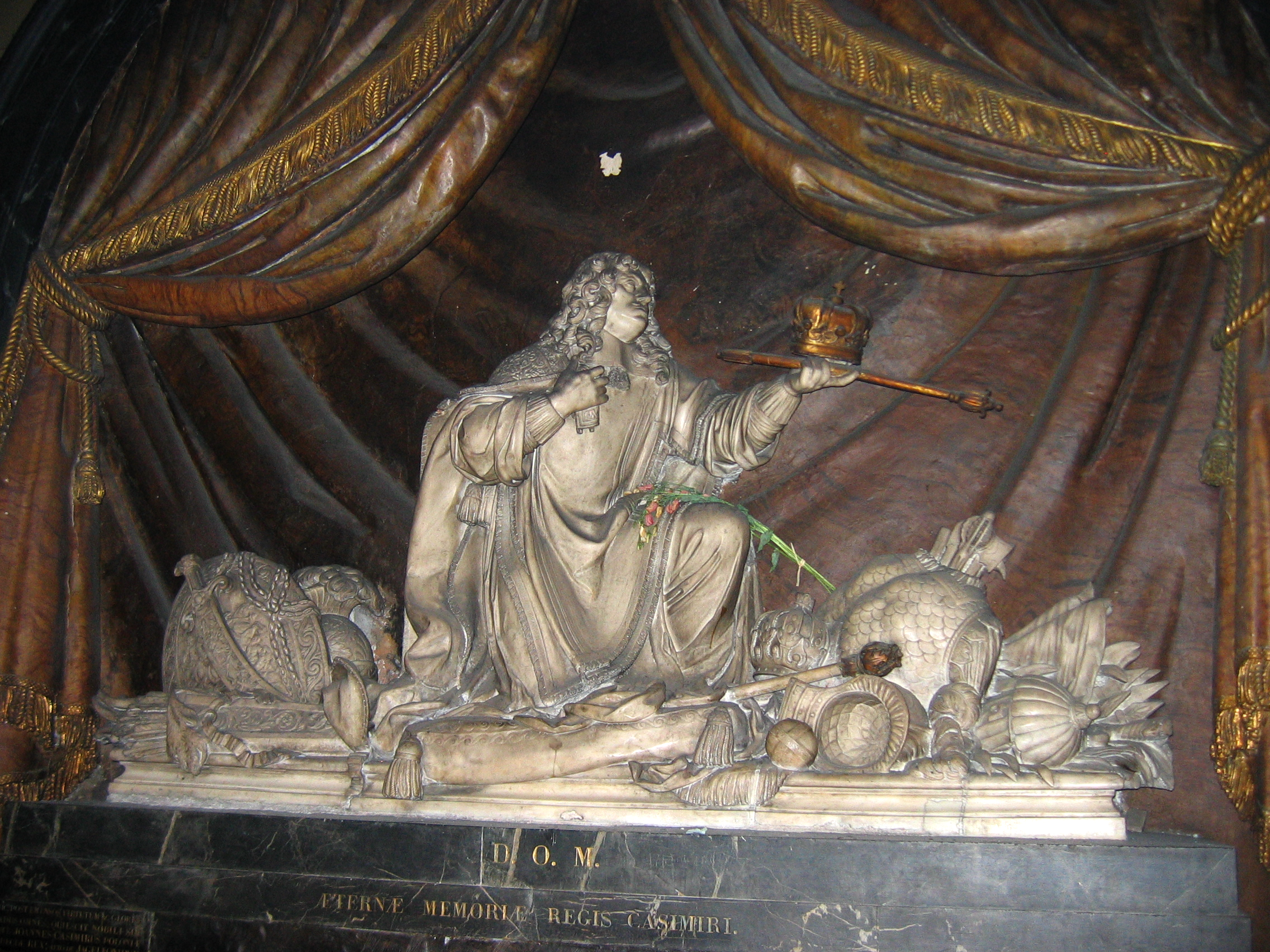
Tomb effigy of heart of King John II Casimir at Abbaye de Saint-Germain-des-Prés, Paris

Charles-Paris d'Orléans; François Louis, prince of Conti; Henri Jules, prince of Condé; and Louis, prince of Condé were candidates for the Polish throne.

=== 18th century ===
In the 1730s, Stanisław I Leszczyński, king of Poland, who tried to continue Sobieski's efforts and align Poland and France, after losing the War of the Polish Succession, retired to France, where he became duke of Lorraine in 1737. He was a great patron of arts and science in Lorraine. He established the Académie de Stanislas in Nancy, and he commissioned the construction of the Place Stanislas, Nancy's stunning main city square and UNESCO World Heritage Site. In the mid-18th century, his daughter, Princess Marie Leszczyńska was the queen consort of France and wife of Louis XV.

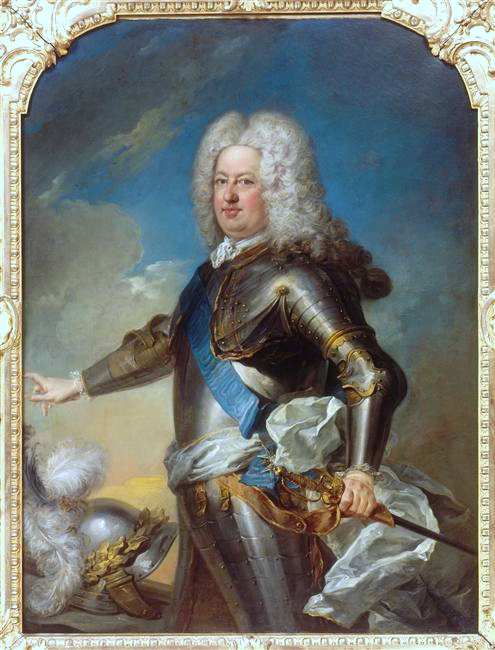
Stanisław I, King of Poland and Duke of Lorraine

During the anti-Russian Confederation of Bar the French Court Royal supported the Polish confederates by sending French officers under Charles François Dumouriez. In the late 18th century both Poland and France entered a revolutionary period, with the French Revolution being a major influence on the reforms of the Great Sejm in Poland. There was, however, never any official Polish–French alliance; in fact France was content to deflect some of its troubles by not allying itself with Poland, as Poland's neighbors, Prussia, Austria, and Russia, expecting a formation of such an alliance, and seeing Polish reforms as a sign of Jacobinite influence, were busy carrying out the partitions of Poland and had less resources to spare to deal with events in France. Many French monarchists, merchants and craftsmen fled the French Revolution to Poland.

=== Napoleonic era ===
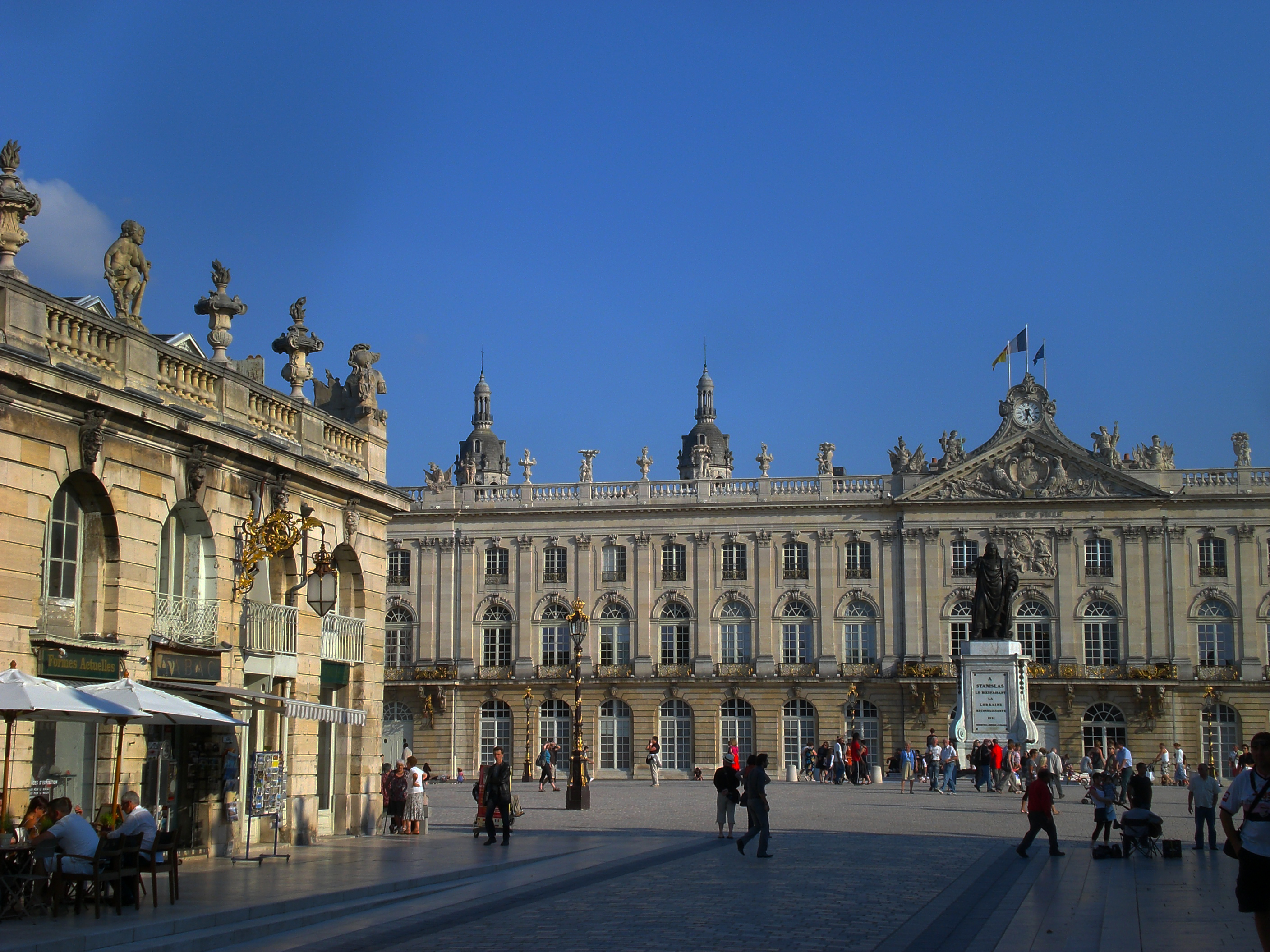
Place Stanislas, Nancy, named after King Stanisław I

Napoleon's creation of the Duchy of Warsaw gave every appearance of resurrecting the Polish nation from the political grave to which it had been consigned in the partitions that ended in 1795. Russia defeated Napoleon and made the "independence" no more meaningful than that of Congress Poland, which emerged from the Vienna settlement. However, the Duchy represented the hope of true independence, whereas Congress Poland was always in Russia's shadow.

The other lasting significance of Napoleon's Grand Duchy is that it cast off old feudal Poland to some degree under the rule of the partitioning powers. Serfdom was abolished and a modern legal code based on the French model was introduced. Critical was the contribution the Napoleonic period made towards the creation of a national legend or myth, which was to sustain and comfort Poles down the decades that followed. Amongst other things, it contributed to a belief that the rest of Europe had an abiding interest in the fate of Poland, arising from Bonaparte's support in 1797 for the formation of Polish Legions, recruited from amongst émigrés and other exiles living in Italy. The Polish national anthem, "Dąbrowski's Mazurka", is a celebration of the legion's commander, Jan Henryk Dąbrowski, and Napoleon is only mentioned in passing. Napoleon's treatment of these soldiers was cynical in the extreme. After the Treaty of Lunéville in 1801, they were sent to the West Indies to suppress the slave revolt in the French colony Saint-Domingue, or modern Haiti.

Napoleon continued to use Poles where it suited him best. Of the fresh forces raised after the creation of the Grand Duchy of Warsaw, some 10,000 were sent to fight against the Spanish and the British in the Peninsular War. However, the Poles were most enthusiastic about the 1812 war against Russia-which Napoleon called the Second Polish War-as they formed by far the largest foreign contingent of the Grand Army. There is no precise information on what form the peace would have taken if Napoleon had won his war against Alexander, but many Poles held to the belief that it would, at the very least, have led to a fully restored Poland, including Lithuania; a return, in other words, to the situation prior to the first partition in 1772. The whole experience of the Grand Duchy of Warsaw is one of Polish confidence in Napoleon's promise of a better future, though there is really nothing that proves he would have fulfilled these expectations.

Polish national determination did impact Czar Alexander I, as he accepted that there could be no return to the position prevailing in 1795, when Poland had been extinguished. On his insistence, lands that had fallen to Prussia on the Third Partition, including the city of Warsaw, became part of his new 'Polish State', a satellite state that had a high degree of political latitude and one that preserved the Napoleonic Code. Alexander may have hoped to transfer some of the fierce loyalty the Poles had formerly shown towards his great rival towards himself; but he merely perpetuated a myth. The hope of a liberal Poland, of Napoleon's Poland was kept alive, until it was all but destroyed in the uprising of 1830–1831. Thereafter, most of those who went into exile sought refuge in France, the home of the Napoleon myth, which gave it fresh life. In 1834, from his Paris exile, Adam Mickiewicz wrote his epic poem, Pan Tadeusz, which celebrates Napoleon's entry into Lithuania in 1812 thus; All sure of victory, cry with tears in eyes/God is with Napoleon, and Napoleon is with us!

Although the legend declined over the years, especially as Napoleon III offered no support to the Polish rising of 1863, it did not altogether die. It received fresh encouragement in 1918, as France was the only western power that offered unqualified support to the newly independent Poland. May 5, 1921, the hundredth anniversary of Napoleon's death, was formally marked by commemorations across the new nation. And he lives, and will continue to live, in the national anthem.

=== Great Emigration ===
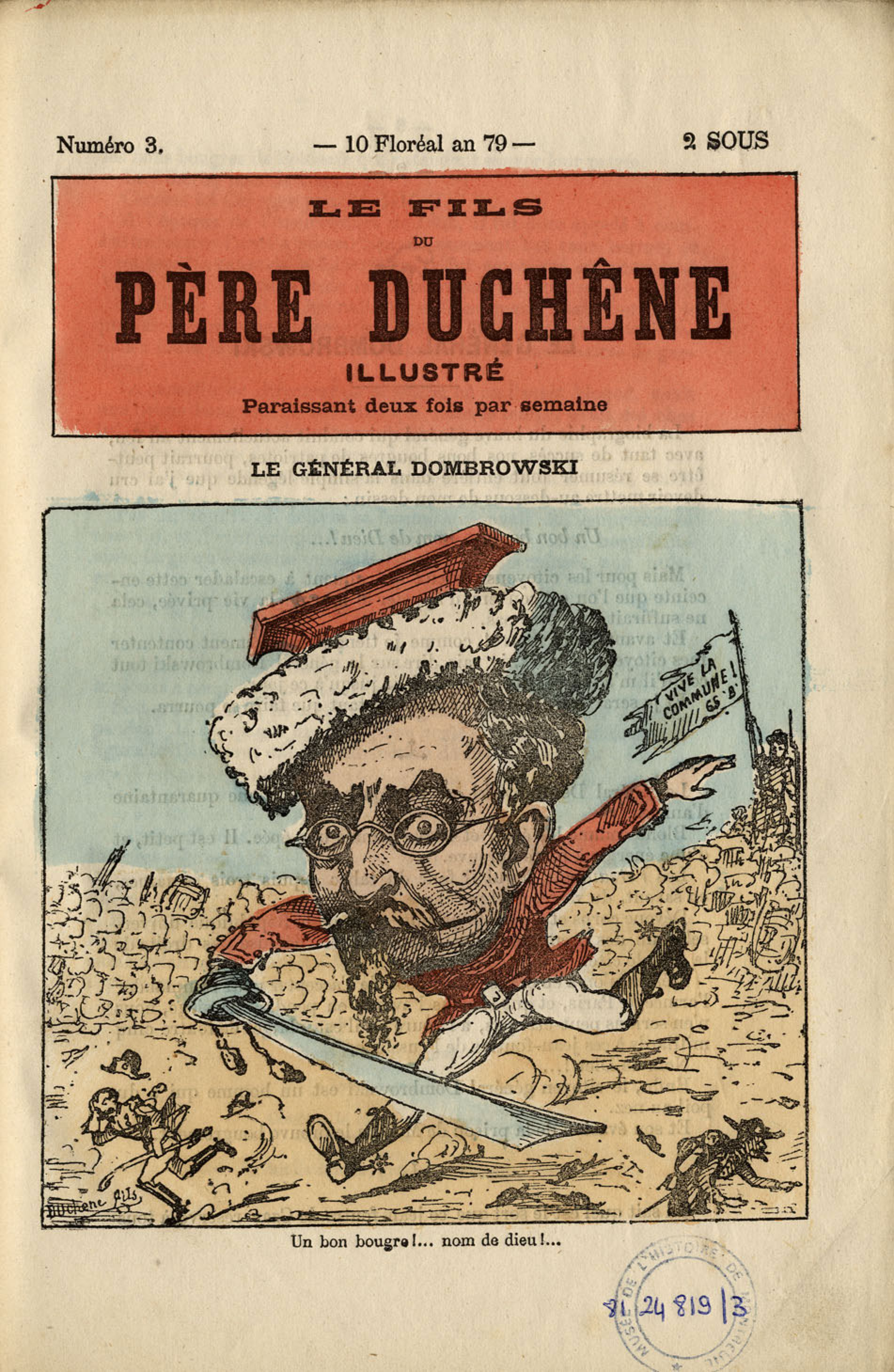
Jarosław Dąbrowski caricatured in Le Père Duchesne Illustré: "Un bon bougre!... Nom de Dieu!..." ("Good chap!... Good God!...")

The Great Emigration was an emigration of political elites from partitioned Poland from 1831 to 1870, particularly after the November and January uprisings. Since the end of the 18th century, people who carried out their activities outside the country as emigres played a major role in Polish political life. Because of this emigration of political elites, much of the political and ideological activity of the Polish intelligentsia during the 18th and 19th centuries was done outside of the lands of partitioned Poland. Most of those political émigrés were based in France, seen by the Poles - freshly influenced by Napoleon - as the bastion of liberty in Europe.

It was during that era that some celebrated Poles came to live in France, such as the composer Frédéric Chopin, writers like Adam Mickiewicz, Cyprian Norwid or entrepreneurs like Louis Wolowski and Citroen and much later, the scientist Maria Skłodowska-Curie (Marie Curie).

Some of the remnants of the 19th-century Polish community in France, i.e. the Polish Library, Adam Mickiewicz Museum and Polish Historical and Literary Society in Paris are listed by UNESCO's Memory of the World Programme.

=== Interwar period ===
Poland and France were political and military allies during the interwar period. The political agreement signed in Paris on February 19, 1921 established cooperation between them. Starting with the Blue Army that aided France in World War I and the French Military Mission to Poland during the Polish–Soviet War (1919–1921), the Franco-Polish Military Alliance was signed in 1921 and continued until the German invasion of Poland.

=== World War II ===
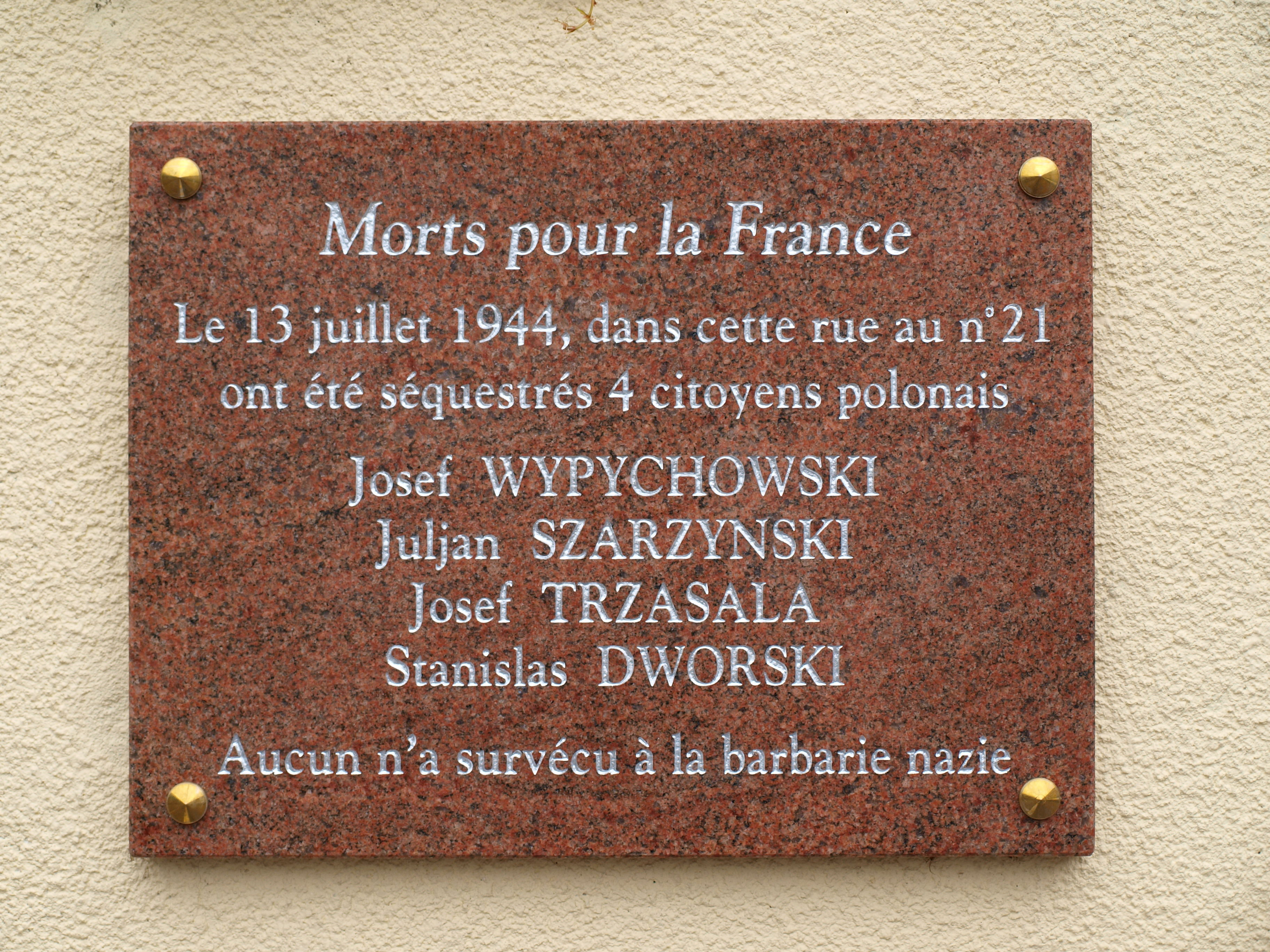
Memorial plaque to Polish resistance members murdered by the Germans in 1944 in Malay-le-Grand, France

France declared war on Germany when it invaded Poland in 1939, and then attacked Germany, however, the French soon withdrew in what is known as the Phoney War. During the German invasion, Poland evacuated its gold reserve to France. During the subsequent German occupation of Poland, a new Polish Army formed in France under the command of General Władysław Sikorski in late 1939. Polish units included the 1st Grenadiers Division, among others. France itself fell to Germany following the German invasion of France in 1940, and afterwards, 23,000 Poles were deported by the Germans to slave labour in German-occupied France, and French prisoners of war were also deported to German prisoner-of-war camps and forced labour camps in German-occupied Poland. Due to the German occupation of both countries, official Polish–French relations ceased in 1940–44. Some Poles became part of the French Resistance. Polish troops also took part in the liberation of France in 1944. Despite this, France was blamed for betraying its promise to help in Poland, due to the alliance treaty signed between Poland and France prior to World War II; later it was extended after large territories in the East of Poland was annexed by the Soviet Union, which eventually became modern Belarus, Ukraine and Lithuania after the Dissolution of the Soviet Union in 1990–1991.

=== Cold War ===
During the Cold War, Polish–French relations were poor, due to both countries being on the opposite sides of the Cold War. However France was - again - a site of a thriving Polish emigrant community (see Kultura and Jerzy Giedroyc). Other prominent members of the Polish community in France of that period have included Rene Goscinny.

In 1957, Poland and France signed an agreement for cultural cooperation, resulting in the founding of the Centre Français at the University of Warsaw with Michel Foucault as its first director.

=== Post-1991 ===
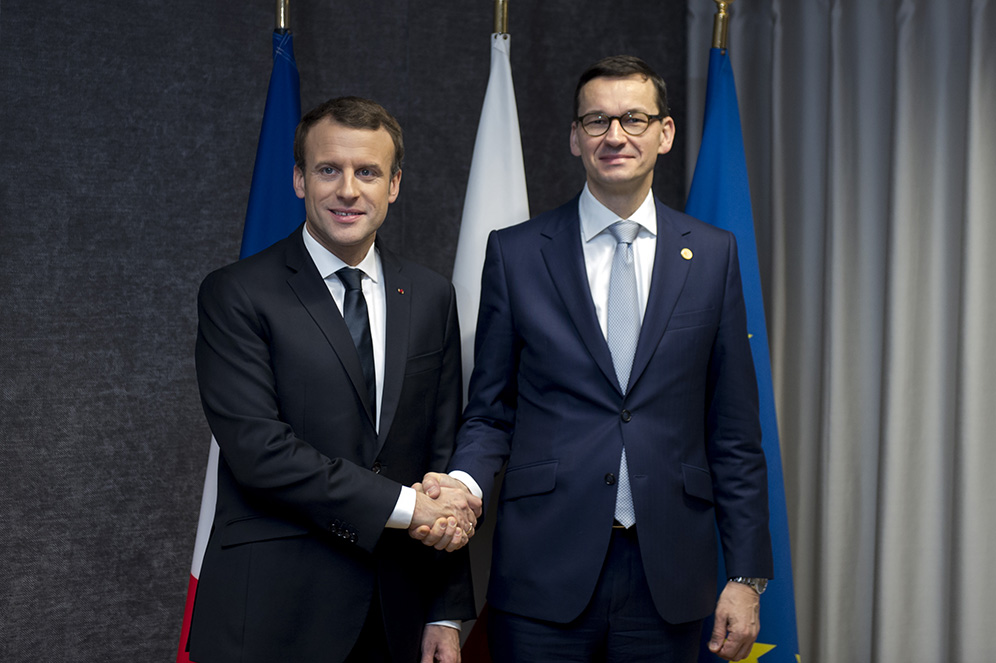
President of France Emmanuel Macron (left) and Prime Minister of Poland Mateusz Morawiecki (right) in Brussels

Polish-French relations have improved after the fall of communism. Poland, France and Germany are part of the Weimar Triangle which was created in 1991 to strengthen cooperation between the three countries.

France, as a founding member of the European Community, European Union, and NATO, as well as a permanent member of the United Nations Security Council and nuclear power, is one of Poland's principal political, economic, cultural, scientific and technological partners.

The year 2004 marked a breakthrough in Polish-French relations. After a period of tension caused by different approaches to the Iraq crisis and the European Constitution negotiations, relations improved. After the accession of Poland to the European Union on May 1, 2004, meetings of the heads of state from both countries have been organized yearly.

France is the largest contributor of foreign direct investment in Poland. The French companies with the largest presence in Poland include Orange, Vivendi, Carrefour, Casino, Crédit Agricole, Saint Gobain and Auchan.

Controversy was caused by the phrase "Polish Plumber", which appeared in France around 2005.

About one million ethnic Poles live in France, concentrated in the Nord-Pas de Calais region, in the metropolitan area of Lille and the coal-mining region (bassin minier) around Lens and Valenciennes. Polish mineurs' descendants are also found in Auberny.

Poland and France have held intergovernmental consultations on several occasions. The last such summit took place on 2015 in Paris with President François Hollande and Prime Minister Ewa Kopacz.

In August 2022, Poland sent 146 firefighters and 49 vehicles to France, the largest such group from a foreign country to help extinguish the 2022 wildfires in France.

In May 2025 in Nancy, Polish Prime Minister Donald Tusk and French President Emmanuel Macron signed a cooperation and friendship treaty with a defense clause committing the parties to mutual military support in case of an attack by an aggressor. Macron stressed that the treaty was not a substitute for existing military relations through the European Union and NATO.

== European Union and NATO ==
While France was one of the founding members of the European Union (EU), Poland joined the European Union (EU) in 2004. While France was one of the founding members of NATO, Poland joined NATO in 1999.

== Resident diplomatic missions ==
of France in Poland

- Warsaw (Embassy)
- Kraków (Consulate-General)

of Poland in France

- Paris (Embassy)
- Lyon (Consulate-General)

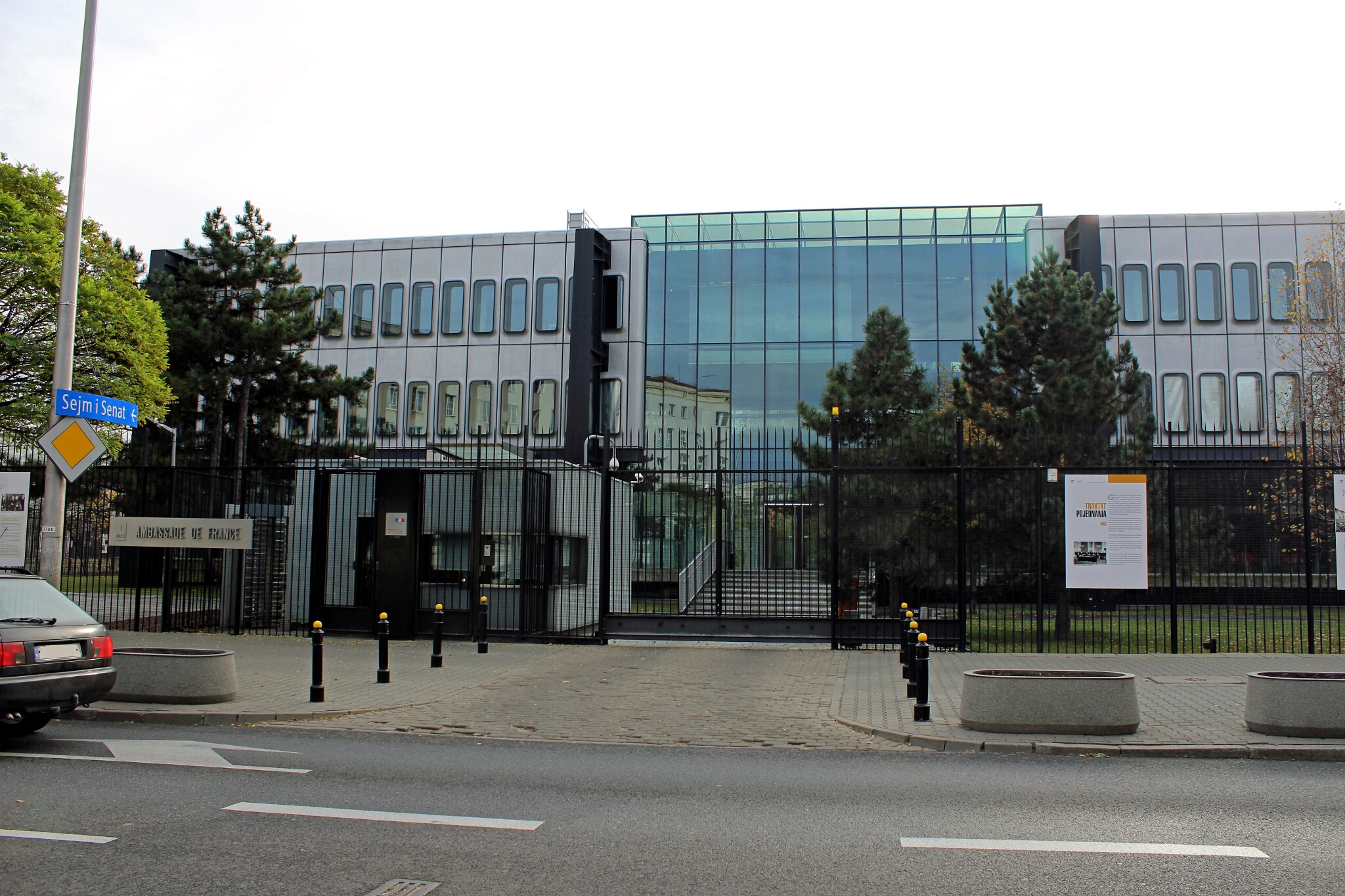
Embassy of France in Warsaw

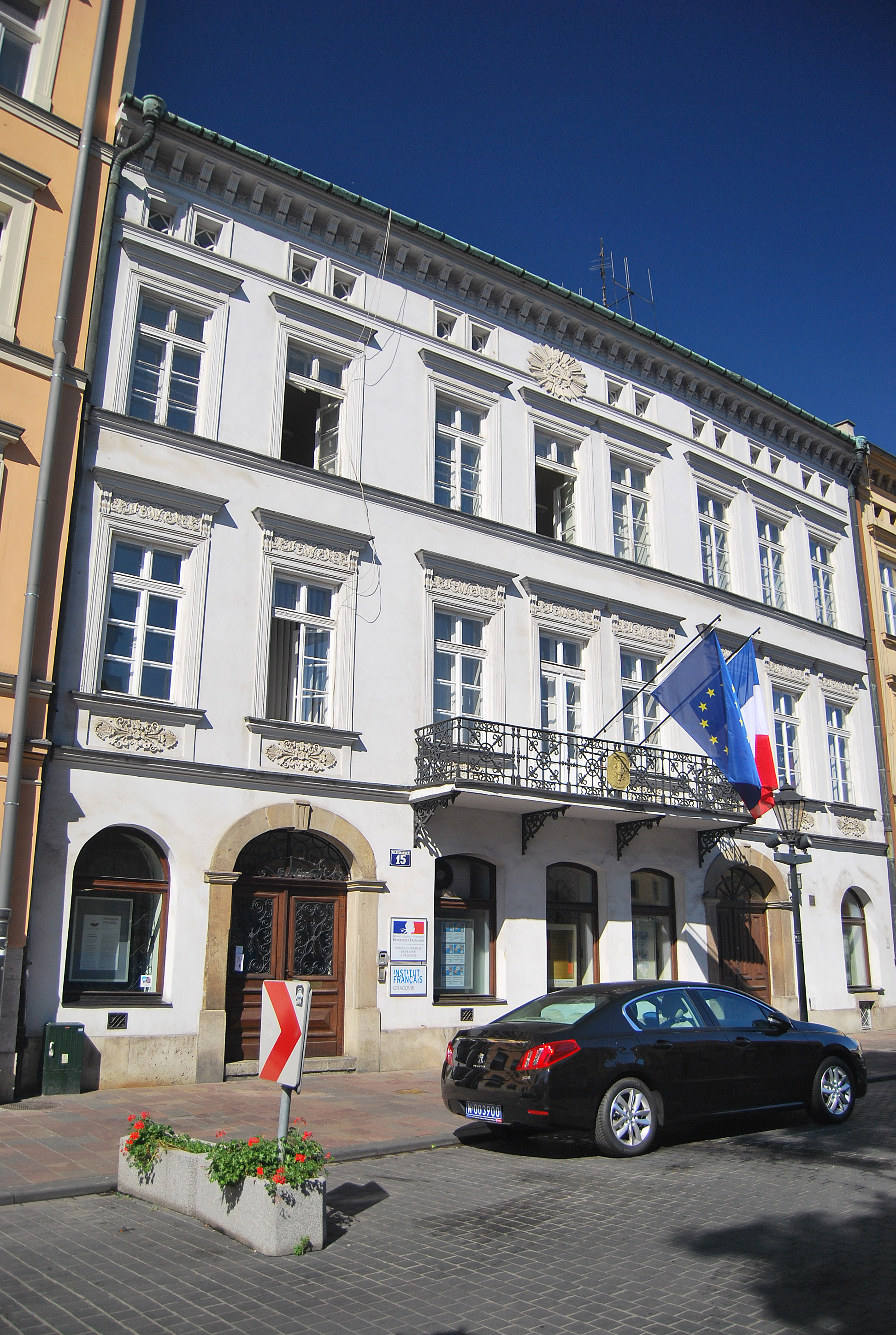
Consulate-General of France in Kraków

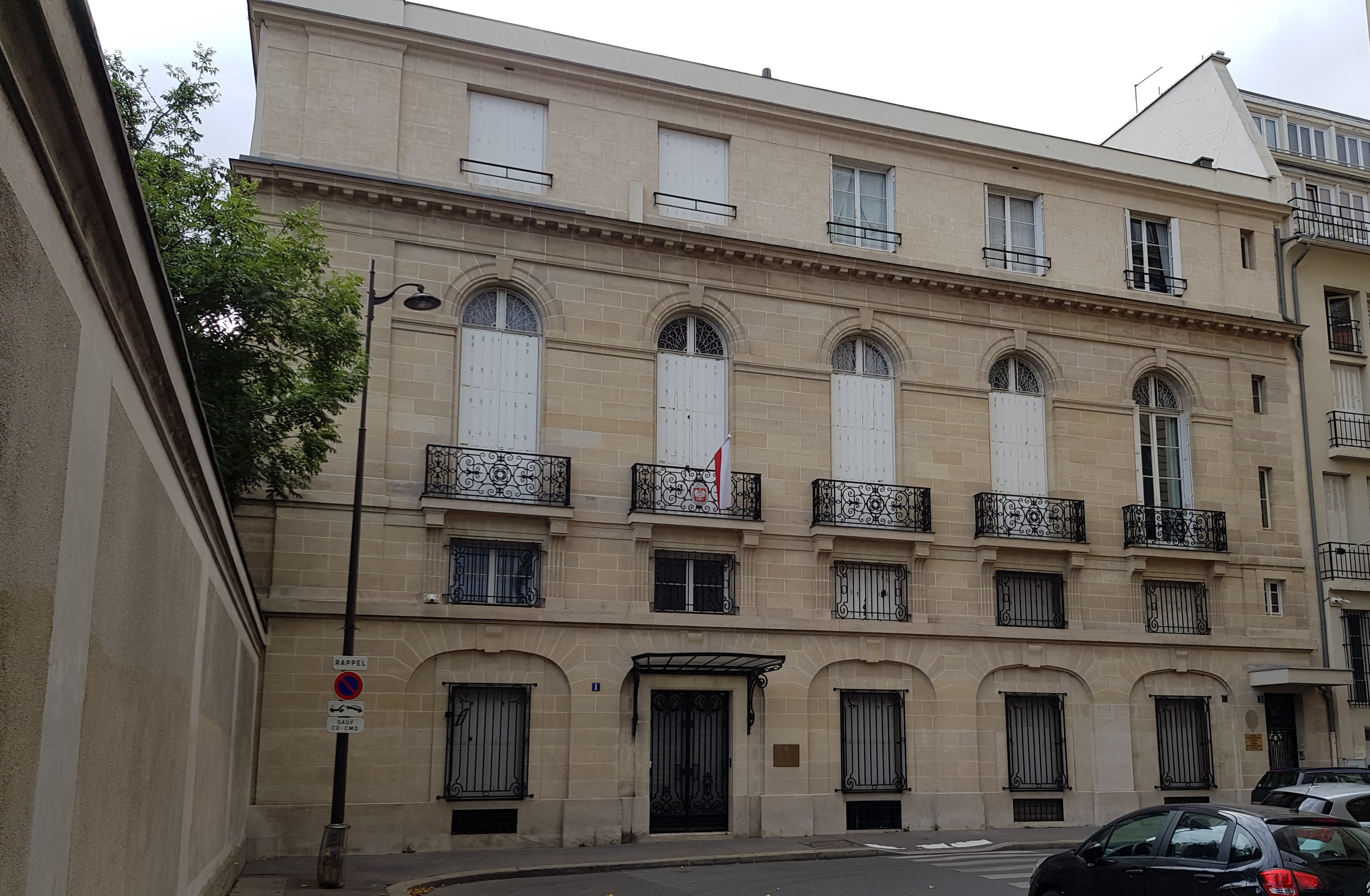
Embassy of Poland in Paris

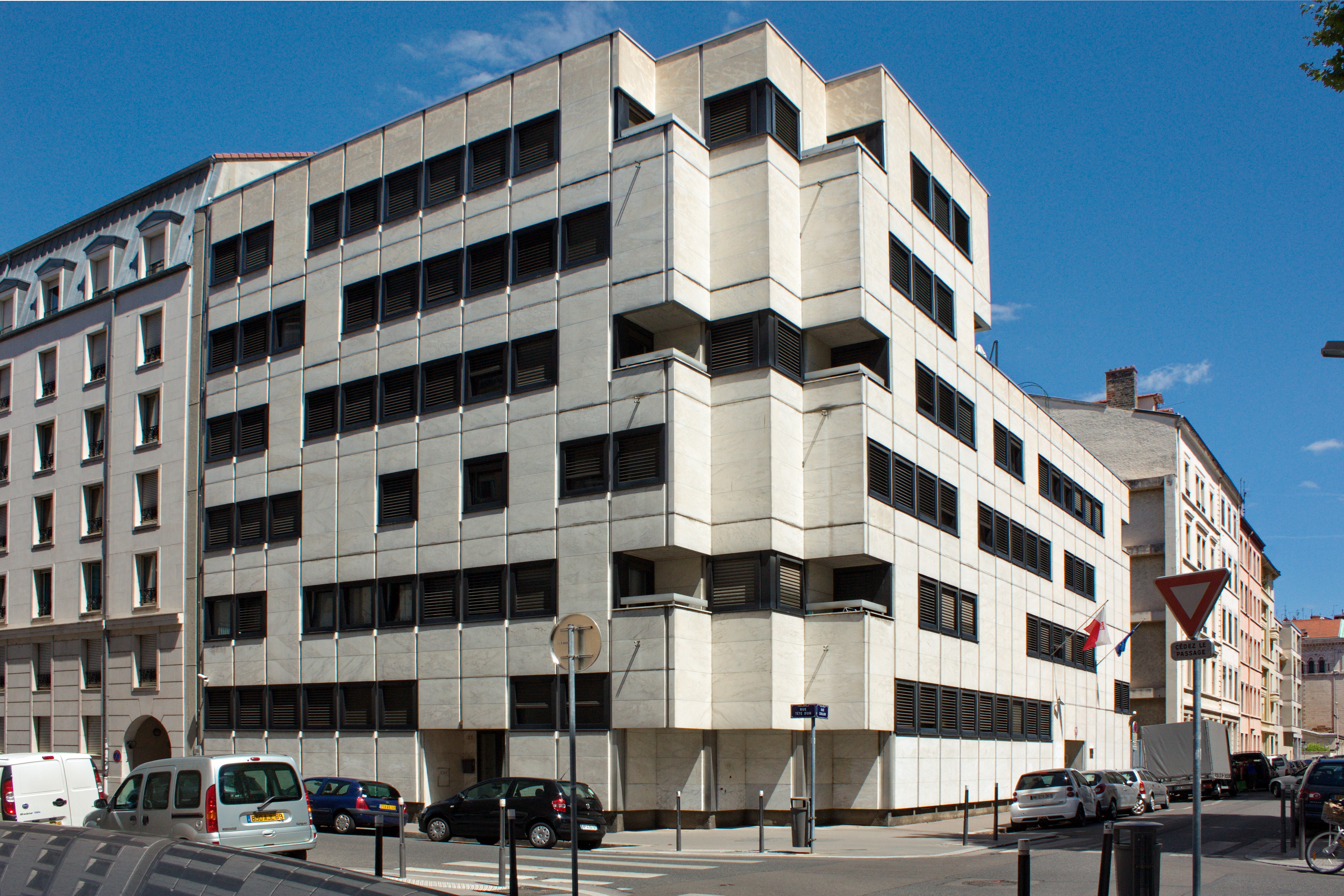
Consulate-General of Poland in Lyon

== See also ==
- Poles in France
- French people in Poland
- List of Ambassadors of France to Poland
- Polish Legions
- Franco-Polish alliance
- Hôtel Lambert
- List of twin towns and sister cities in France
- List of twin towns and sister cities in Poland
- France–Ukraine relations
- Germany–Poland relations
- Poland in the European Union
