= Polish immigration to the Ronchamp coal mines =

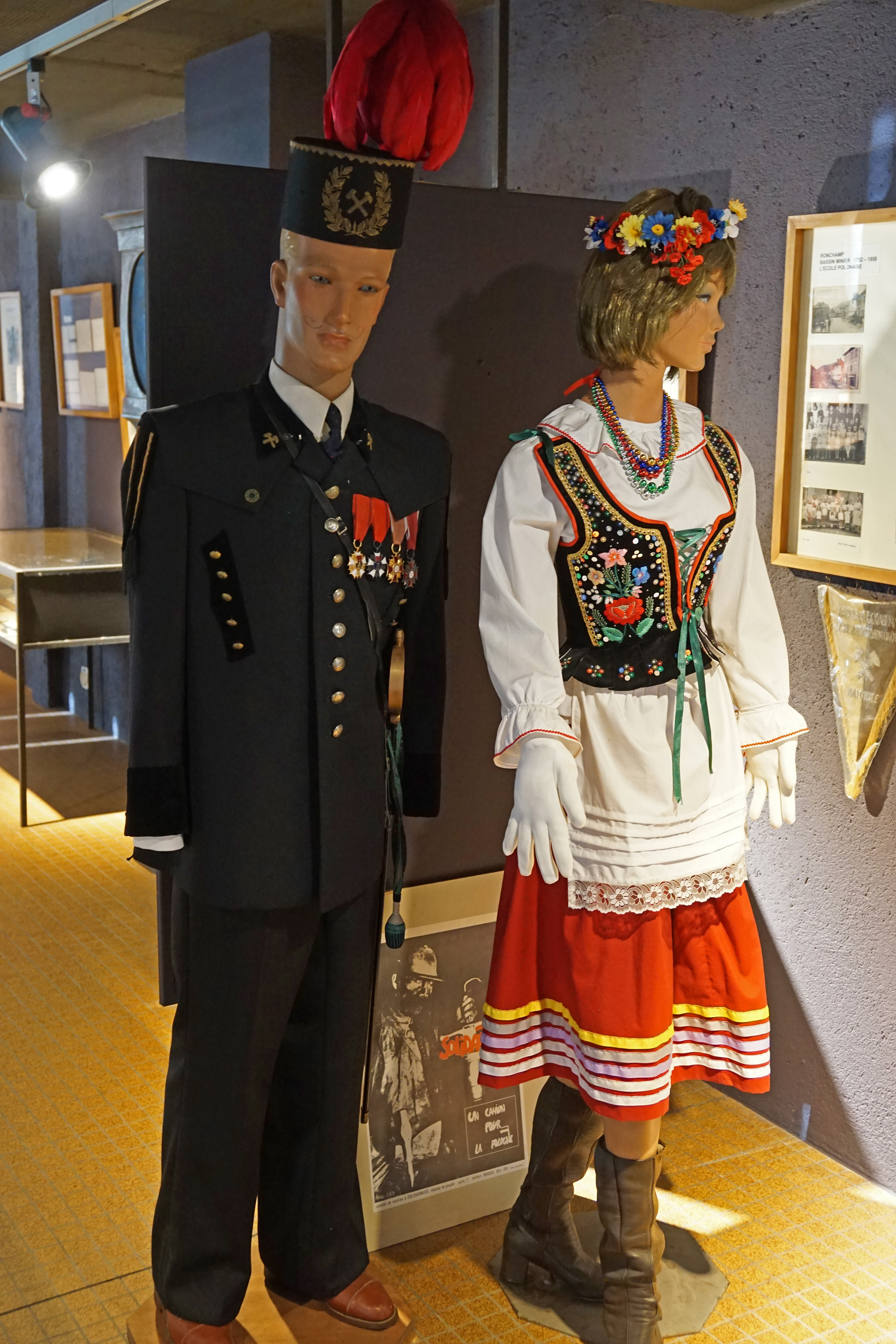
Costumes traditionnels de mineurs polonais au musée de la mine Marcel-Maulini.

Polish immigration to the Ronchamp coalfield is the largest and most influential immigration of people of Polish origin to the Ronchamp coalfield. It took place in three phases during the interwar period and strongly influenced the mining and cultural traditions of Ronchamp, which has been twinned with the town of Sułkowice in southern Poland since 2003.

== Background ==
In the 1850s, the Ronchamp collieries were booming, and the number of workers tripled over the decade, from 500 to 1,500. Demand for labor was so great that the neighboring communes were no longer sufficient, and the company was forced to hire foreign workers. In 1861, a dozen Piedmontese were hired at the Ronchamp mines. However, they were poorly received by the local population and management, and soon left. Later, in the 1870s, following the Kulturkampf, several Poles left their homeland, and a small number settled in Ronchamp.

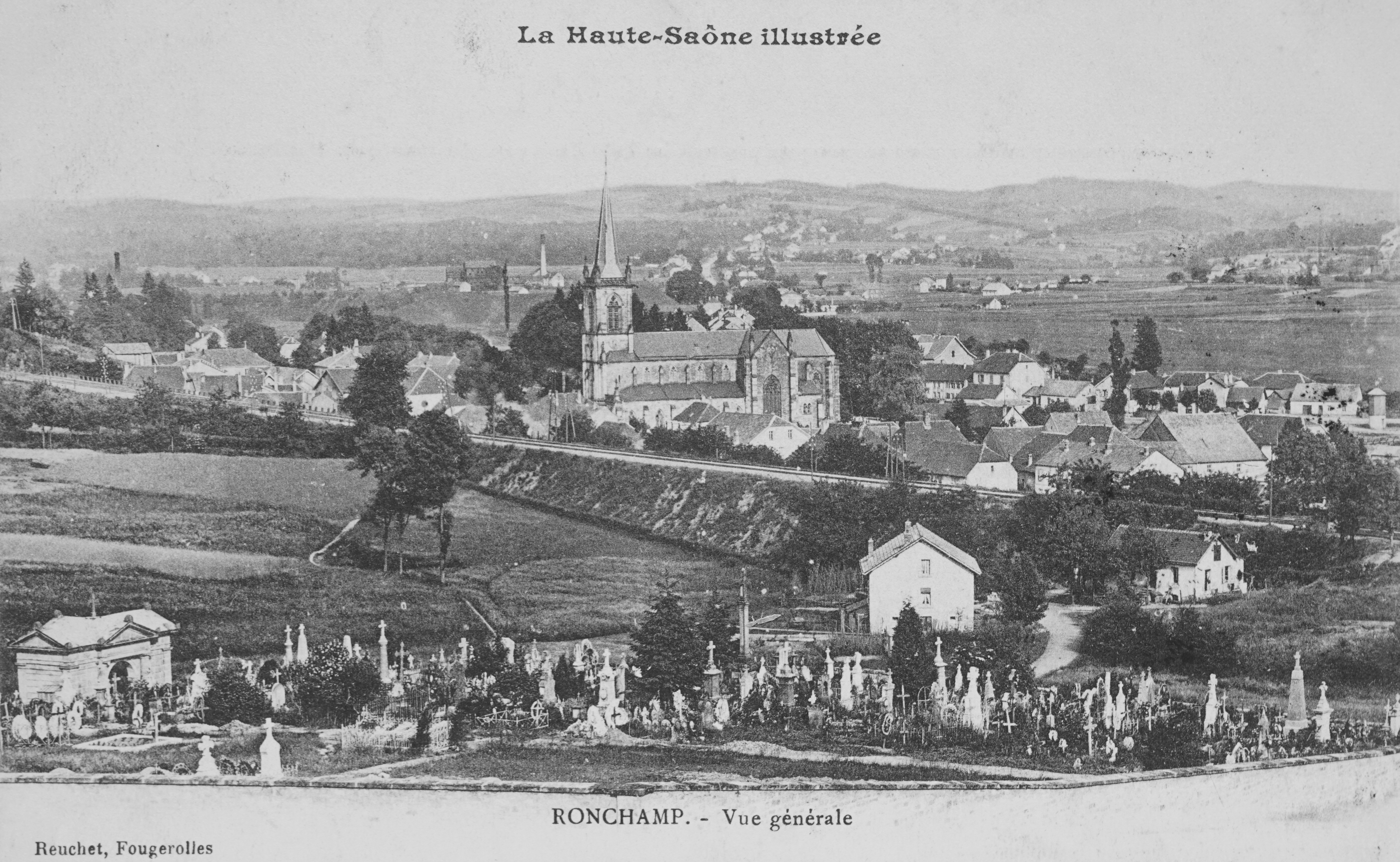
General view of Ronchamp at the end of the 19th century.

During the First World War, many mobilized workers were injured, killed, or reported missing, and the government decided to recruit foreign workers to replace them. In Ronchamp, the labor problem was less acute, as miners from the Nord-Pas-de-Calais and Belgium coalfields, as well as German prisoners of war, had been employed in the mines since 1916. But at the end of the war, workers from the Nord and German prisoners (400 at the Ronchamp mines) returned home and reconstruction began. To make up for this sudden shortfall, the mines hired 200 Chinese workers. However, these workers were still frowned upon by the local population, and the miners went on strike to demand that they be removed from the shafts. These workers were hired without being trained in mining techniques, and although they represented only 20% of the workforce, they were responsible for 30% of accidents at the bottom of the mines. In 1919, Poland was experiencing strong demographic growth, while France was short of workers. On September 3, 1919, the two countries signed an immigration agreement governing the introduction of Polish workers into France. In December of the same year, the Ronchamp collieries received 112 Polish farm workers from the Warsaw region to replace the Chinese. The Poles were generally well received by the Ronchamp population, but their integration remained difficult. They had come to Ronchamp without their families, to work in an unfamiliar profession. Added to this is the language barrier and unfamiliar territory. For these reasons, most of them left. Nevertheless, with a family of five children and twenty-six singles, Polish nationality was still the third largest in Ronchamp in 1921, when immigration intensified.

== The influx ==
When France occupied Düsseldorf and Duisburg, many Polish miners moved to Westphalia with their families, a movement that gained momentum in January 1923. The German miners went on strike, while the Poles continued to work. The French and Polish authorities advised the miners to seek employment in French mines. The Ronchamp collieries benefited from a large influx of skilled miners until 1925. In January 1924, 403 of the 972 miners were Polish. The peak of the Polish workforce was reached in September of the same year, with 581 workers.

In 1925, the proportion of Poles dropped sharply following a halt in recruitment and a poor trading situation. However, the following year, the administration noted that there were as many departures as arrivals. In 1926, Poincaré's monetary stabilization halted inflation, triggering an economic crisis in France. Many mining companies, including Ronchamp, laid off Polish workers until 1927. In 1929, the number of Polish workers at the Ronchamp mines was at its lowest, at 132.

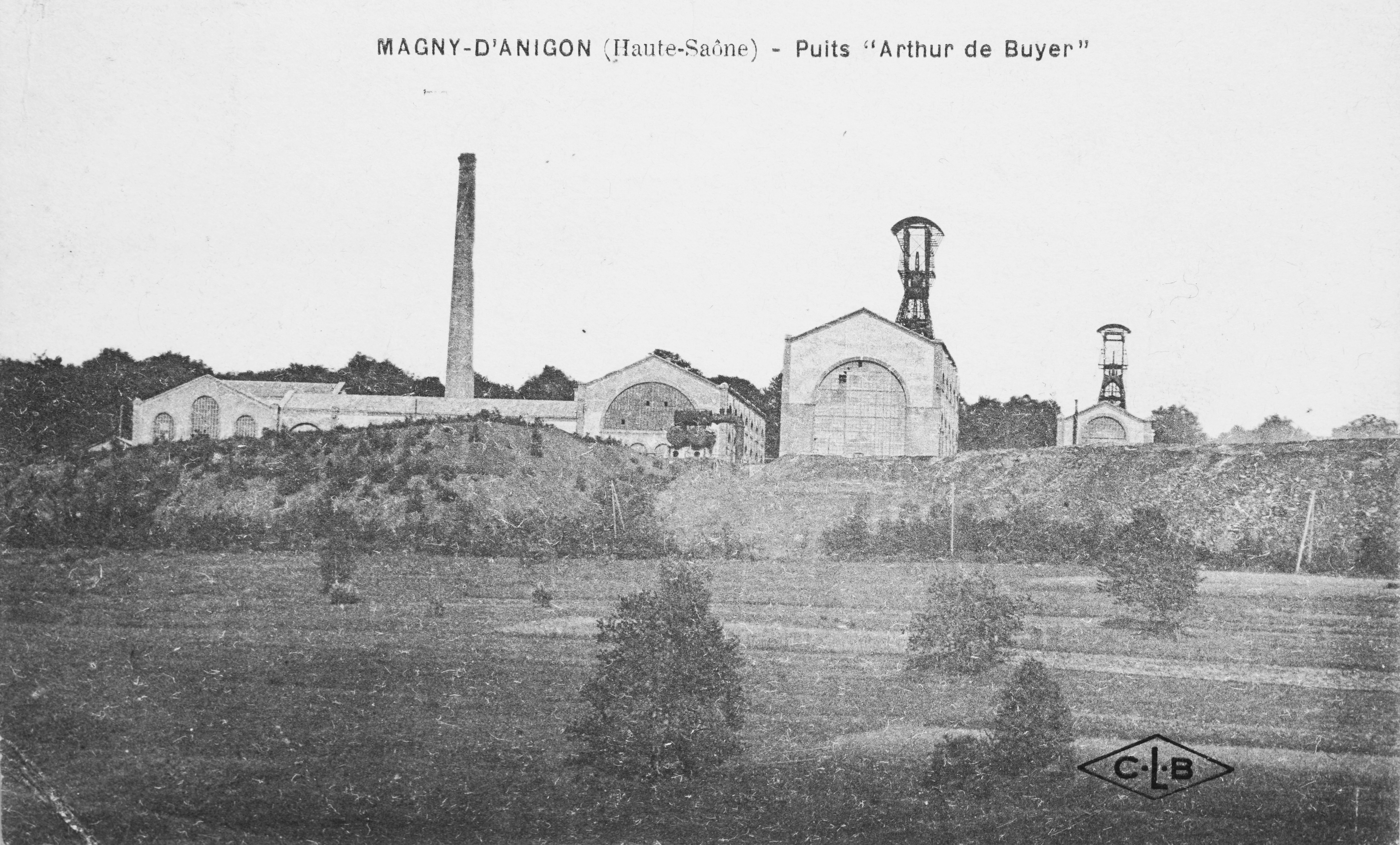
The Arthur-de-Buyer well, where many Polish immigrants worked.

In April 1929, the reopening of borders encouraged the return of foreigners to Ronchamp. The number of Poles arriving increased from 308 in February 1930 to 450 in January 1931. 70% of them lived in the communes of Ronchamp, Champagney, and Magny-Danigon, as close as possible to their place of work. The rest lived in neighboring communes such as Clairegoutte, Frédéric-Fontaine, and Palante. At the beginning of 1931, the Ronchamp coalfield was home to 1,017 Poles, including 424 workers, representing 90% of the foreign population and half of the workforce.

Number of Polish families in Ronchamp
Year	Polish families
1921	1
1923	42
1924	87
1925	135
19217	201

== Crisis and war ==
In the 1930s, the Ronchamp collieries were hit hard by the economic crisis. Despite these financial difficulties, the company remained optimistic about recovery, choosing to halt new hiring, promote voluntary redundancies, and limit layoffs. In 1934, the company suddenly decided to massively lay off its Polish workforce, and 124 miners were dismissed from the Ronchamp mines. Some were retrained as farm workers thanks to government aid, while others preferred to move to other mining areas or work in factories around Belfort and Montbéliard. The decline in the Polish workforce continued the following year when 112 workers were laid off. Additionally, Polish workers' identity cards were restricted to the département where they were issued, which limited their mobility in seeking new employment opportunities.

After 1936, mining activity picked up slightly and the mines needed new miners, so previously dismissed Poles returned to work in Ronchamp. The number of underground miners rose from 491 in December 1937 to 542 in March 1938. In 1938, the Daladier government took measures against foreigners, limiting their freedom of movement, making naturalization more difficult, and requiring them to have a health booklet. In 1939, their freedom of association was curtailed. These measures triggered social unrest in Ronchamp, which, unlike other coalfields, was not suppressed. In 1939, before France was mobilized for the Second World War, several sons of Polish immigrants refused to be naturalized in order to escape the war but were still liable to be called up to fight. In August 1940, the German authorities counted 509 Poles living in the coalfield, 163 of them employed by the mine.

== Cultural influence ==
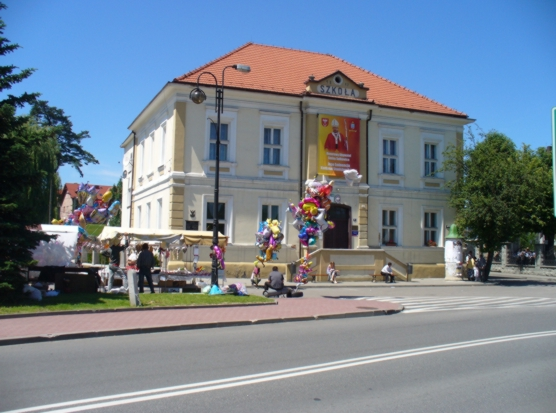
Sułkowice town hall

Polish immigration strongly influenced Ronchamp's mining and cultural traditions. In all French coalfields, measures were taken to foster social ties between immigrants in order to boost their productivity. For example, mining housing estates were built for immigrant families, and special educational and religious programs were set up. The Poles regularly organized processions and pilgrimages specific to their customs, but local residents sometimes also took part, as on the Polish national holiday, when the “Harmonie des houillères”, made up entirely of French musicians, took part. Associations are also set up to maintain Polish culture in Ronchamp, including music, dance, sport, theater, art, and religion. The company and local associations also seek to bring the two communities closer together, notably through sports clubs, a Franco-Polish festival committee and small businesses. Additionally, both communities shared common mining traditions, further connecting their experiences.

After the “Retrofolies” came to an end in 2000, the Ronchamp festival committee decided to organize a Franco-Polish festival in honor of the former Polish miners of Ronchamp from September 14 to 16, 2001. The festival was motivated by the desire of the miners' descendants to reconnect with their homeland. Following the festival, the commune and the festival committee decided to set up a twinning arrangement with a Polish town. Research was carried out in the Krakow region, as this is where the Polish miners from Ronchamp were thought to have come from (a belief disproved by subsequent historical research). A rapprochement was quickly made with the town of Sułkowice, which was the most motivated. Over the following years, several trips were organized between the two towns. The twin town was formalized on September 21, 2003, when the two mayors, Raymond Massinger and Joseph Mardaus, signed a parchment. The twinning took place against the backdrop of Poland's accession to the European Union.

As part of the cultural development policy of the Ballons des Vosges regional nature park, a contemporary dance show is created in Ronchamp by the festival committee to pay tribute to former Polish miners and celebrate the twinning with Sułkowice. The show, entitled Swiatlo, which means “light” in Polish, was performed during the European Heritage Days in September 2004 by a troupe of three musicians and four dancers from Belfort. In 2005, the show was performed in two other towns in the nature park: Giromagny and Gérardmer. It was also performed in China.

Masses in Polish are organized once a month in Ronchamp's Notre-Dame-du-Bas church by the Polish Catholic Mission of the North-East, one of the consequences of Polish immigration still visible in 2005.

== See also ==
- Ronchamp coal mines
- Ronchamp
- Sułkowice
- Poles in France
- Polish immigration to the Nord-Pas-de-Calais coalfield

== Bibliography ==
- Thiriet, Jean-Philippe (2001). Les Polonais dans les houillères de Ronchamp, 1919-1939. Salins-les-Bains: Musées des techniques et cultures comtoises. p. 77. ISBN 2-911484-05-3.
- Parietti, Jean-Jacques (2001). Les Houillères de Ronchamp vol. I : La mine. Vesoul: Éditions Comtoises. p. 87. ISBN 2-914425-08-2.
- Parietti, Jean-Jacques (2010). Les Houillères de Ronchamp vol. II : Les mineurs. Noidans-lès-Vesoul: fc culture & patrimoine. p. 115. ISBN 978-2-36230-001-1.
- Moser, Elena; Leu, Pierrick (2005). Terrain urbain Ronchamp : Ronchamp et la Pologne: Observation et analyse des liens sociaux locaux et globaux. Neuchâtel: Institut de géographie de l'Université de Neuchâtel (UniNE).
- Mégevand, Julie; Willemin, Delphine (2005). Terrain urbain Ronchamp : Le parc naturel régional des ballons des Vosges. Neuchâtel: Institut de géographie de l'Université de Neuchâtel (UniNE).
