= Jean-Michel Dubois =

French politician

- Jean-Michel Dubois in 2011
- Born: August 27, 1943; Enghien-les-Bains, Val-d'Oise, France
- Died: February 20, 2025 (aged 81); Boulogne-Billancourt, Hauts-de-Seine, France

Jean-Michel Dubois (French pronunciation: [ʒɑ̃ miʃɛl dybwa]; 27 August 1943 – 20 February 2025) was a French politician and a member of the far-right National Front (FN). He was a member of the Gaullist Rally for the Republic until 1985.

Dubois was initially a member of the Rally for the Republic (RPR), but spent the bulk of his career within the FN, which he joined in 1986 and where he held various leadership positions. Since 2018, he has been a member of the party's national executive committee. Since 1986, Dubois stood for the FN in many elections, mostly regional and local elections.

He served as a regional councillor for Île-de-France from 1986 to 2010, as a regional councillor for Upper Normandy from 2010 to 2015, and once again as a regional councillor for Île-de-France from 2015 to 2021. In 2009, the FN selected him to lead the FN list in the Île-de-France constituency ahead of the 2009 European elections.

== Life ==
He pursued his higher education at the École d'ingénieur Violet and the École supérieure d'électromécanique et d'automation (ESEA), qualifying as an engineer. Later, he served as commercial director for the company Sperry-Remington Bureautique—which he would go on to acquire in 1977—having already founded his own company in 1970. He has also held positions as a corporate director for firms operating in the fields of equipment and signaling systems.

At the same time, he became involved in several socio-professional organizations. He was elected to the consular assembly of the Paris Chamber of Commerce and Industry, serving from 1982 to 1997, and became president of the chamber’s sports commission. In 1997, he was elected as a consular judge, and from 2004 to 2008, he served as a magistrate at the Commercial Court of Bobigny, in the Seine-Saint-Denis department. For a time, he was also a member of the committee for combating undeclared work, a member of a departmental tax commission, and a member of a departmental committee for road safety.

He was also involved in the field of education: he was appointed by decree as an advisor for technological education for the Académie de Paris, the Paris education authority, responsible for organizing and supervising schools and universities in Paris. He held this position on several occasions between 1991 and 2010 (serving a fourth term). In June 2010, he became the secretary general of this body. His roles at the Paris Île-de-France Regional Chamber of Commerce and Industry (CCIP) led to his serving as a board member for the business schools HEC and ESCP Europe. He was an honorary vice-president of the École supérieure de négociation commerciale (Negocia) and an honorary president of the Académie commerciale internationale, a business school belonging to the Negocia group. He also served as an apprenticeship supervisor at the Chamber of Trades (French: Chambre des métiers).

In terms of trade union and professional representation, he joined the National Union for Small and Medium-Sized Industry and the General Confederation of Small and Medium-Sized Enterprises (CGPME), eventually becoming its vice-president for the Seine-Saint-Denis department.
