= Polish resistance in France during World War II =

After the fall of France, many Poles who were not involved in the regular Polish Army in France during World War II, or who were unable to reach the United Kingdom where the Polish Army in the United Kingdom had been formed, became the pillars of the Polish resistance in France.

== Origin ==
That resistance started to organize under the inspiration of Consul General Aleksander Kawałkowski alias Justyn, in agreement with the Polish government in exile in London, helped by an emissary Czesław Bitner. The organization was founded on 6 September 1941, in collaboration with the French Resistance. Its mission was intelligence, sabotage, writing and distribution of underground newspapers in Polish, and burning pro-Nazi German literature, such as newspapers, or biographies of supporters of fascism. The ability to parachute consisted of 60 bases in 20 reception in the south, 41 in the North and Center, according to messages sent by the French section of the BBC. Officers, weapons, radio equipment, and explosives were thus parachuted.

The night of 22 to 23 July 1943, when Colonel Daniel Zdrojewski was dropped, marks the birth of the POWN - Polska Organizacja Walki o Niepodległość - Polish Organization for the Struggle for Independence. In 1943, the Organization had 4000 members.

== Activities ==
Colonel Zdrojewski was Chief of the Polish Military Operations in France. He was in close contact with General Marie-Pierre Koenig, commander in chief of the Forces Françaises de l'Intérieur (FFI). The relationship between the French and Poles, fighting a common enemy, were very friendly. There were Polish companies in the resistance, as part of FFI. The Organization's sophisticated sections included transport and delivery of equipment and men parachuted to their places of destination. Women and young Scouts incumbent liaison missions, intelligence, transport of underground newspapers, leaflets and so on. Intelligence units have sent information on 182 launchers V1 flying bombs and V2 which 162 were bombed by Allied aircraft. The mission of the Sabotage section was to destroy telephone lines and power lines, to draw up barricades on roads, destroy or move telephone poles. Their mission was also to cause or facilitate the desertion of forcibly enlisted Poles from the German army (Wehrmacht) or the Organization Todt, leading to 15 000 deserting the Wehrmacht and 10 000 the Organization Todt. General Eisenhower felt that the activities of the Resistance was a contribution equivalent to 8 military divisions. The Polish units openly fought the Wehrmacht. The battalion "Lwów" fought in Cantal and Corrèze, "Warsaw" battalion was engaged in the operations of the Isère and the Alps (see Emile Garabiol). In July 1944 one month before the liberation of the Isère, the Polish students of the Lycée of Villard-de-Lans took part in combat against the Germans alongside the French resistance on the plateau of the Vercors. Of the 27 Poles, mostly aged 16 to 19 years, 11 died, as did 2 teachers and the doctor of the school.

Units of the POWN fought alongside FFI in the Departments of the Côte-d'Or, Jura and Saône et Loire. When the contact was established between the Conseil National de la Résistance (CNR) and POWN the battle groups headed by Colonel Zdrojewski were attached to the movement of FFI on the basis of an agreement with Lyon on 28 May 1944 between the General Chaban-Delmas, Chief Military Provisional Government of the Republic of France and General Zdrojewski.

== Other Polish resistance groups in France ==
POWN was not the only Polish group involved in the Resistance in France. Other resistance groups were similar to those issued by the French Communist Party as the Polish immigrant labor, the MOI. She maintained a correspondence with Fred (Alias Jacques Duclos). The group members of the Polish language MOI were mostly former soldiers of the International Brigades in Spain, Jarosław Dąbrowski Brigade (about 3000 men). The arrival of the POWN in the mining area of Nord Pas de Calais, led to a confrontation between supporters of the Polish government in exile in London and the MOI of the CPF. Poles were also members in the Youth Battalions. They would later become members of the Francs-Tireurs et Partisans (FTP) after the attack on the USSR by the armies of Hitler in June 1941.

Other units made of foreign Jews were active, with the identity or name "Jews born in Poland." In 1944, they began to train Polish Committee of National Liberation (PKWN) who supported the policy of communism Poland, it was opposed to the POWN under the command of the Polish government in exile in London.

Members of the Polish Socialist Party (PPS; a mainstream political party in Poland prior to the war) had created two underground organizations in the Department du Nord Pas de Calais early in 1941, the Organization and S Orzel Bialy (White Eagle). Both organizations were designed to inform the Poles in France on military developments and spread the idea of resistance to the Germans.

== See also ==
- Polish immigration to the Nord-Pas-de-Calais coalfield
