= Narodowiec =

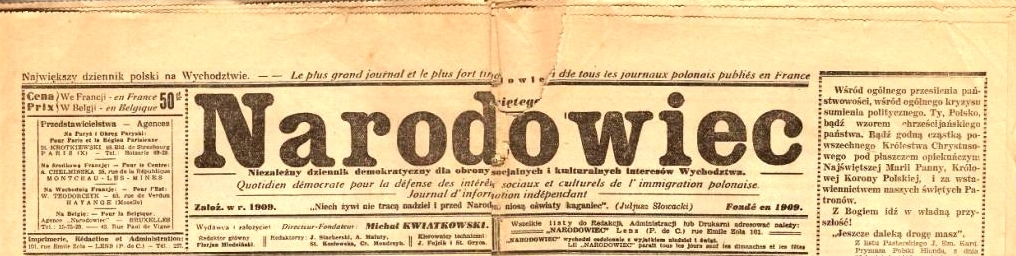
The Polish language daily newspaper "Narodowiec" was published in North France in the last century.

Narodowiec (lit. The Nationalist) was a Polish-language socialist daily newspaper published from Lens in France in 1924–1989. Before the World War II, it had a circulation of up to 40,000 and was seen as the largest Polish-language newspaper in France. As of 1960, it had a circulation of around 40,000. This newspaper was first established in Herne by Michal Franciszek Kwiatkowski and the first edition was issued on 2 October 1909.
