= Aleksander Kawałkowski =

Polish soldier and diplomat

- Born: 1899
- Died: 1965 (aged 65–66)
- Military career
- Allegiance: Poland
- Branch: Polish Land Forces
- Unit: Polish Resistance
- Conflicts: Second World War

Aleksander Kawałkowski (1899–1965) was a Polish soldier and diplomat. He joined the Polish armed forces (Polska Organizacja Wojskowa) in 1915, and then the recreated Polish Army in 1918. During the time of the Second Polish Republic, he was a lecturer in the Oficerska Szkoła Inżynieryjna (Officer's School of Engineering) military academy, a member of the Wojskowe Biuro Historyczne (Military History Bureau), and a member of the Ministry of Religion and Education. From 1934 to 1936 he was a Polish military attaché in Paris and then became Polish consul general in Lille, France. After the fall of France during the Nazi invasion, he was active in the Polish underground in France during World War II. After the liberation of Paris in 1944, he joined the Polish government in exile at the rank of minister.

In the Polish Army, he reached the rank of podpułkownik (Lieutenant Colonel).
