= Augustin Lesieux =

French sculptor

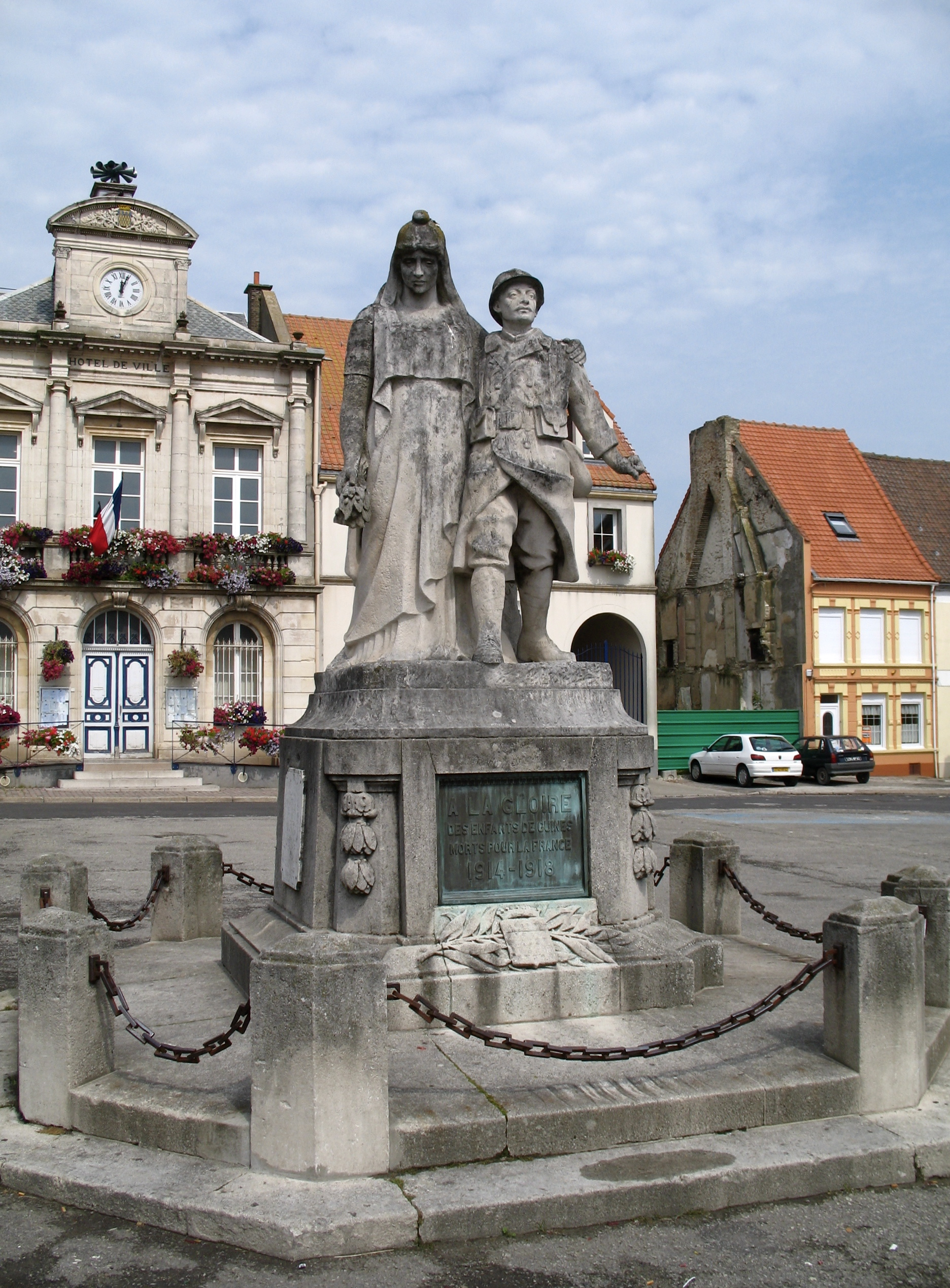
Guînes war memorial

Augustin Lesieux (1877 in Sombrin – 1964) was a French sculptor.

He studied at the École des Beaux-Arts in Arras from 1896 to 1899 and then at Lille before finishing his studies at the École des Beaux-Arts in Paris. From 1901 he worked in Rodin's studio. After the 1914-1918 war he worked on many monument aux morts and completed numerous other public works.

== Monument aux morts ==
Lesieux carried out the sculptural work on the following monument aux morts.

Work	Image	Location	Subject, notes and references
Guînes Monument aux morts		Guînes Pas-de-Calais	The monument aux morts at Guînes dates from 1921.
Étaples Monument aux morts		Étaples Pas-de-Calais	The monument aux morts at Étaples involves sculptural work by Augustin Lesieux. The inauguration took place on 28 December 1924. It seems that Lesieux used the sculptor Ateni to help with some of the preparation work. Étaples was the principal depôt and transit camp for the British Expeditionary Force in France in the 1914-1918 war.
Le Portel Monuments aux morts		Le Portel Pas-de-Calais	The monument aux morts at Le Portel stands in a public garden near to Le Portel's church. A marine and a soldier feature in Lesieux's composition, both standing before the national flag.
Outreau Monument aux morts		Outreau Pas-de-Calais	The monument aux morts at Outreau is a thoughtful and rather dramatic composition by Lesieux. On a tombstone which appears to have toppled over, a gallic cock sits and trills a victory call, and beneath lies a dead soldier. Vegetation sprouts from underneath the soldier's body this perhaps symbolising the rebirth of France. The monument aux morts of Outreau stands in the Outreau Communal Cemetery in the rue Firmin Blondeel. The monument was inaugurated on 5 February 1922.
Chaville Monument aux morts		Chaville Pas-de-Calais	The monument aux morts at Chaville is identical to that at Outreau . The Chaville monument was inaugurated on 17 July 1921.
Lens Monument aux morts	Lens	Lens Pas-de-Calais	The monument aux morts at Lens stands in the centre of the Lens Van Pelt roundabout in Lens. In his composition for this monument aux morts, Lesieux concentrates on the consequences of the war for both the fighting soldier and the civilian. The poilu stands not in triumph but in reflection. We see a mother and daughter forced to leave their home with only a bundle of possessions and a broken doll thus highlighting the disruption to family life caused by the war and a miner standing at the entrance to a mine, a mine filled with water and broken timbering. The monument was inaugurated on 24 May 1925. At the top of the monument a woman stands with her foot on a torpedo and gestures against the destruction caused by warfare! At the base of the monument are bas-reliefs which repeat the themes shown above them. We see a mine tunnel, the tunnel filled with water and its timbering broken. In another a soldier tries to assist a fallen comrade and in the third we see the factories and mines of Lens damaged by the German bombing.
Les Attaques		Les Attaques Pas-de-Calais	The monument aux morts at Les Attaques features a soldier in high relief.

== Other works ==
Work	Location	Subject, notes and references
Busts of Virginie Demont-Breton and Adrien Demont in the Musée de la Chartreuse in Douai.	Douai Pas-de-Calais	These busts can be seen in the Musée de la Chartreuse in Douai.
Bas-reliefs on the tombstone of Robert Spire (1838–1915) in the cemetery at Saint-Cloud	Saint-Cloud Pas-de-Calais	Lesieux's reliefs involve depictions of Christ and a kneeling woman.
The monument dedicated to Doctor Edmond Theret	Tincques Pas-de-Calais	This work is in Tincques.
Monument at Frévent	Frévent Pas-de-Calais	This monument commemorates the victims of the aerial bombing of Frévent on the 9th and 19 July 1944 and stands near the church of Saint Hilaire. During these raids 117 people were killed. This monument was inaugurated in 1949.
The statue of Messidor	Tilloy-lès-Mofflaines Pas-de-Calais	Lesieux created the statue representing the month Messidor in Tilloy-lès-Mofflaines.
Monument to Jean Jaurès	Méricourt Pas-de-Calais	This Lesieux work was inaugurated on 15 August 1929.
The monument to Emile Basly	Lens Pas-de-Calais	Apart from the sculpture representing Basly himself there are three bronze bas-reliefs at the base of the pedestal. One represents a coal mine, the second Basly's time as the Mayor of Lens and third his time in the Chambre de députés. During the Second World War the work was hidden to avoid any risk of it being taken and melted down by the Germans. It was re-erected in 1956.
The monument to Tailliandier and Briquet	Bapaume Pas-de-Calais	Another work by Lesieux can be seen in Bapaume. This is the monument to Tailliandier and Briquet, both killed in the explosion with destroyed the city hall on 25 March 1917. Bapaume lay in ruins at the end of the 1914-1918 war. It had been occupied by the Germans until March 1917 when they pulled back and reformed their front line. The Germans it seems had left several "booby-traps" behind when leaving Bapaume including a mine under the Town Hall. The mine exploded on the night of 25 March 1917. Captain Raoul Briquet and Albert Tailliandier, two French parliamentarians and several Australian soldiers who were staying overnight in the Town Hall were killed in the blast. The Australian army had come into Bapaume in the wake of the retreating German army. A memorial was erected in memory of the two Frenchmen killed.
The busts of Émile Poiteau and Félix Planquette	Arras Pas-de-Calais	Lesieux was the sculptor of the busts of Émile Poiteau and Félix Planquette in the foyer of the Casino d'Arras in the rue Émile Legrelle, Arras.
The Rosati Monument	Arras Pas-de-Calais	Lesieux also sculpted the Rosati monument now standing in the square behind the Arras Hotel de Ville.
Hôtel de Ville, Lens	Lens Pas-de-Calais	Lesieux's work can also be seen on the facade of the Lens Hôtel de Ville. In this work Lesieux pays tribute to the working class with representation of a labourer and a sorter. Lesieux also carved the two cariatides on the Hôtel de Ville's facade.
Statues of Jean Bodel and Guy Mollet	Arras Pas-de-Calais	These Lesieux statues stand in the interior of the Arras Hotel de Ville.
Amédée and Émile Doutremepuich	Arras Pas-de-Calais	Lesieux was the sculptor of the bas relief dedicated to Amédée and Émile Doutremepuich in Arras cemetery.
The bust of Mgr Dutoit	Arras Pas-de-Calais	Lesieux's bust of Mgr Dutoit can be seen in Arras Cathedral.
