= Lens-Béthune bus network =

Bus network in northern France

Tadao
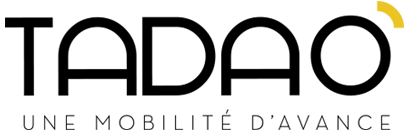

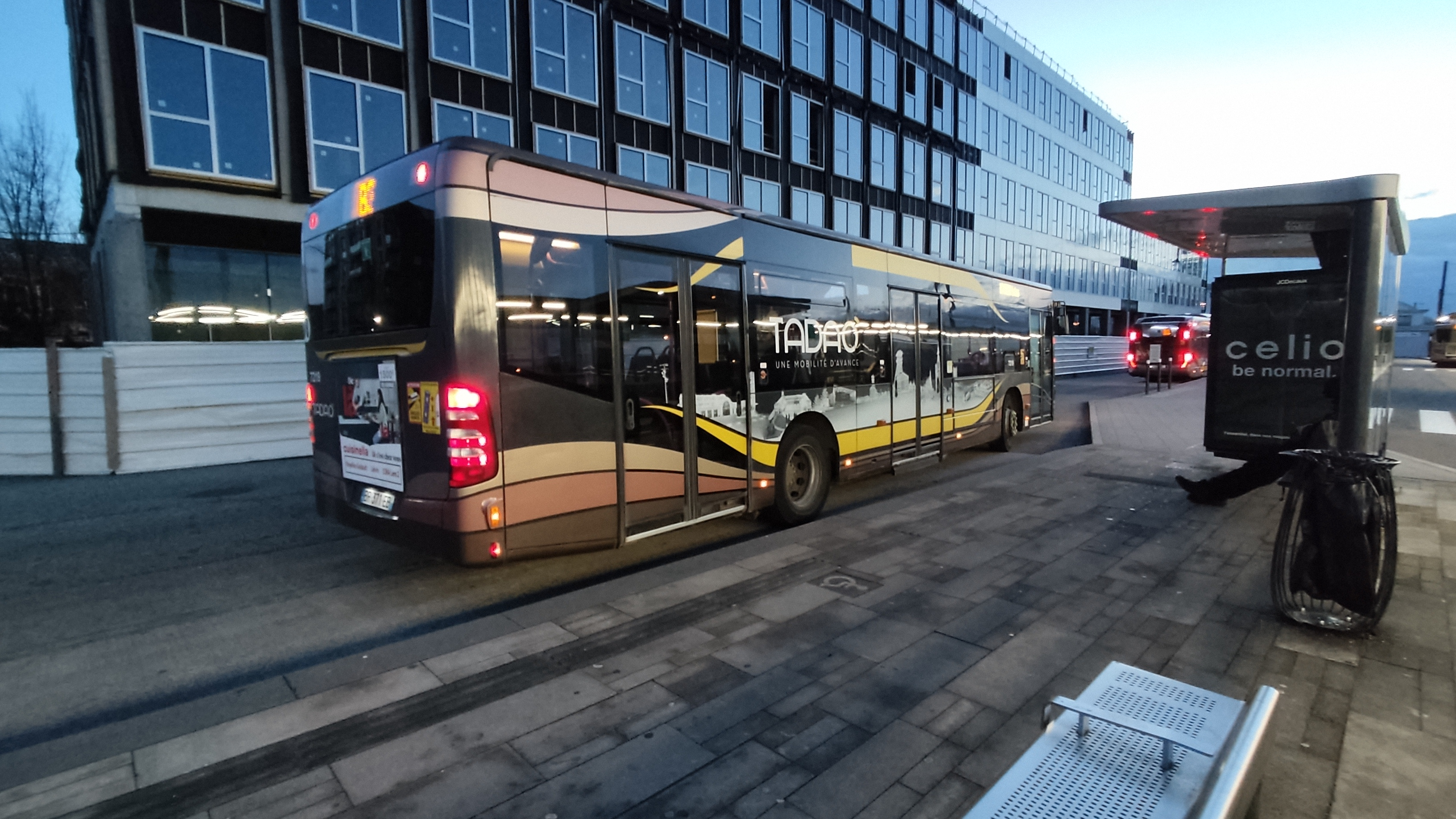
- Tadao bus on route B3 at Lens
- Parent: Syndicat Mixte des Transports Artois-Gohelle
- Commenced operation: 2003
- Locale: Lens – Liévin, Hénin-Carvin, Béthune-Bruay
- Service type: Bus rapid transit
- Website: www.tadao.fr

The Lens-Béthune bus network, more commonly known as Tadao, is a bus network in northern France, centered around the towns of Lens and Béthune. It is the network of the Syndicat Mixte des Transports Artois-Gohelle and services the agglomeration communities of Lens – Liévin, Hénin-Carvin and Béthune-Bruay, comprising a total of 114 communes. Most of its services are operated by Transdev Artois-Gohelle, part of the company Transdev.

== Services ==
Tadao operates standard bus services as well as numerous shuttle bus services, telebus services, services for passengers with limited mobility, services for work commuters and school bus services.
