= Institut de génie informatique et industriel =

Coordinates: 50.4352°N 2.8240°E

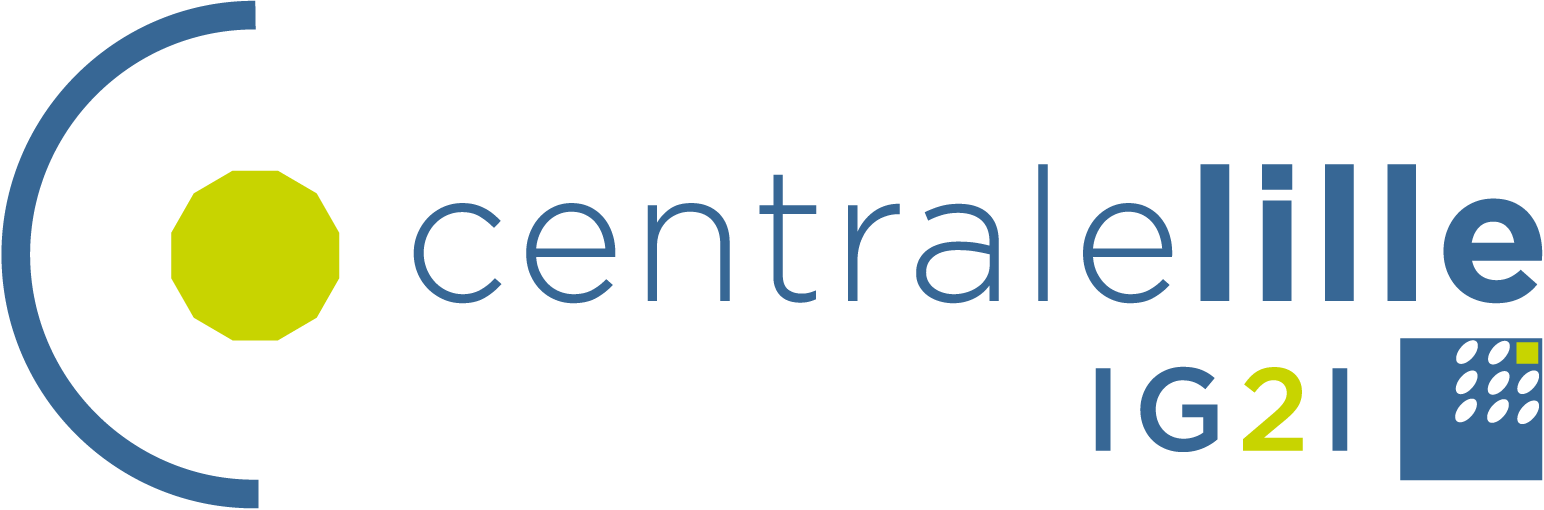
School logo

Institut de Génie Informatique et Industriel (IG2I, EC-Lille) is an information engineering school in Lens, France. Founded in 1992 by "Ecole Centrale de Lille", it offers courses in computer Science, networking, and industrial engineering.
