= Hôtel de Ville, Béthune =

Town hall in Béthune, France

Hôtel de Ville
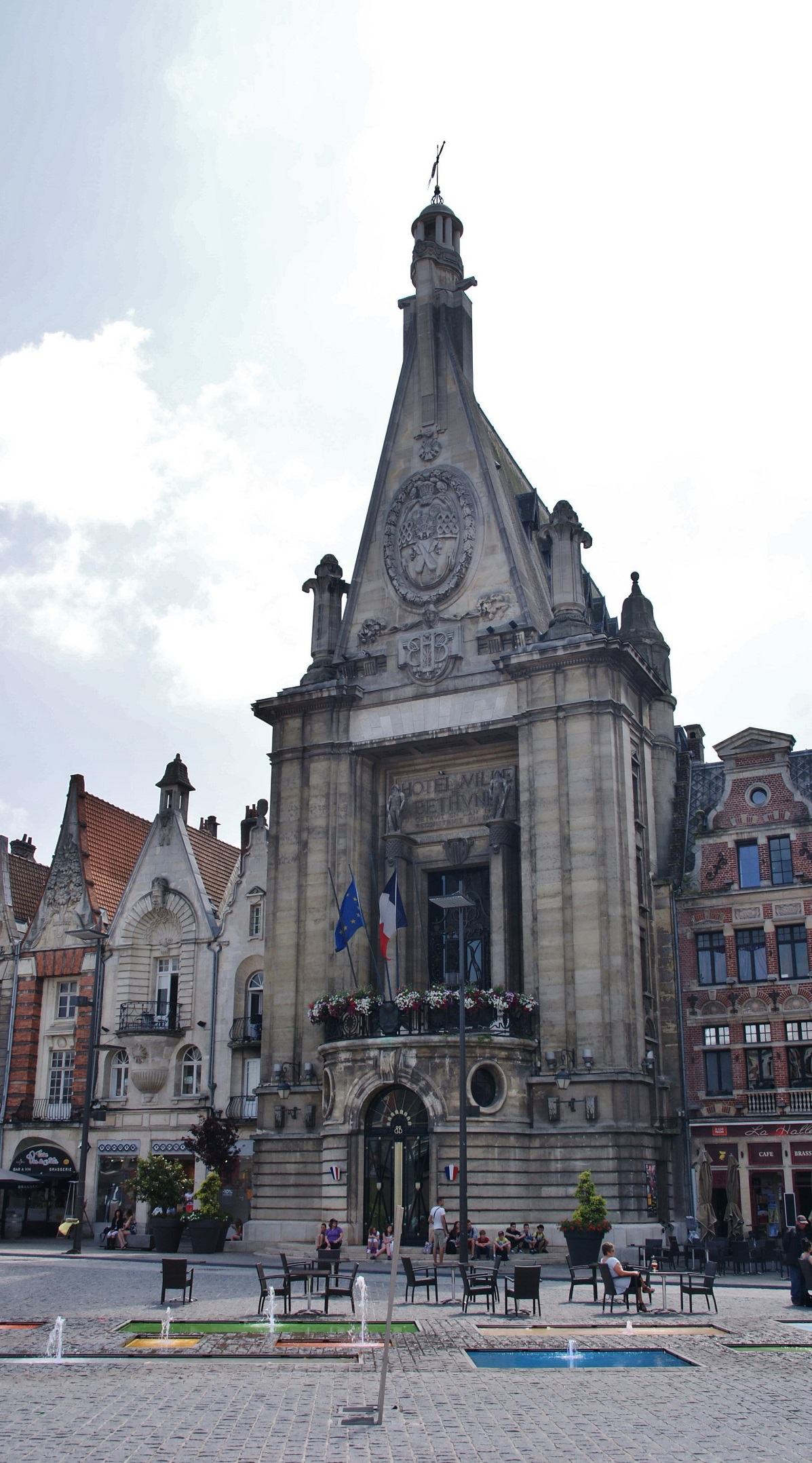
- The main frontage of the Hôtel de Ville in July 2013

General information
- Type: City hall
- Architectural style: Art Deco style
- Location: Béthune, France
- Coordinates: 50.5308°N 2.6386°E
- Completed: 1929

Height
- Height: 45 metres (148 ft)

Design and construction
- Architect: Jacques Alleman

Monument historique
- Official name: Hôtel de ville
- Type: Inscrit
- Designated: 2001
- Reference no.: PA62000040

The Hôtel de Ville (French pronunciation: [otɛl də vil], City Hall) is a municipal building in Béthune, Pas-de-Calais, north France, standing on the Grand Place. It was designated a monument historique by the French government in 2001.

== History ==
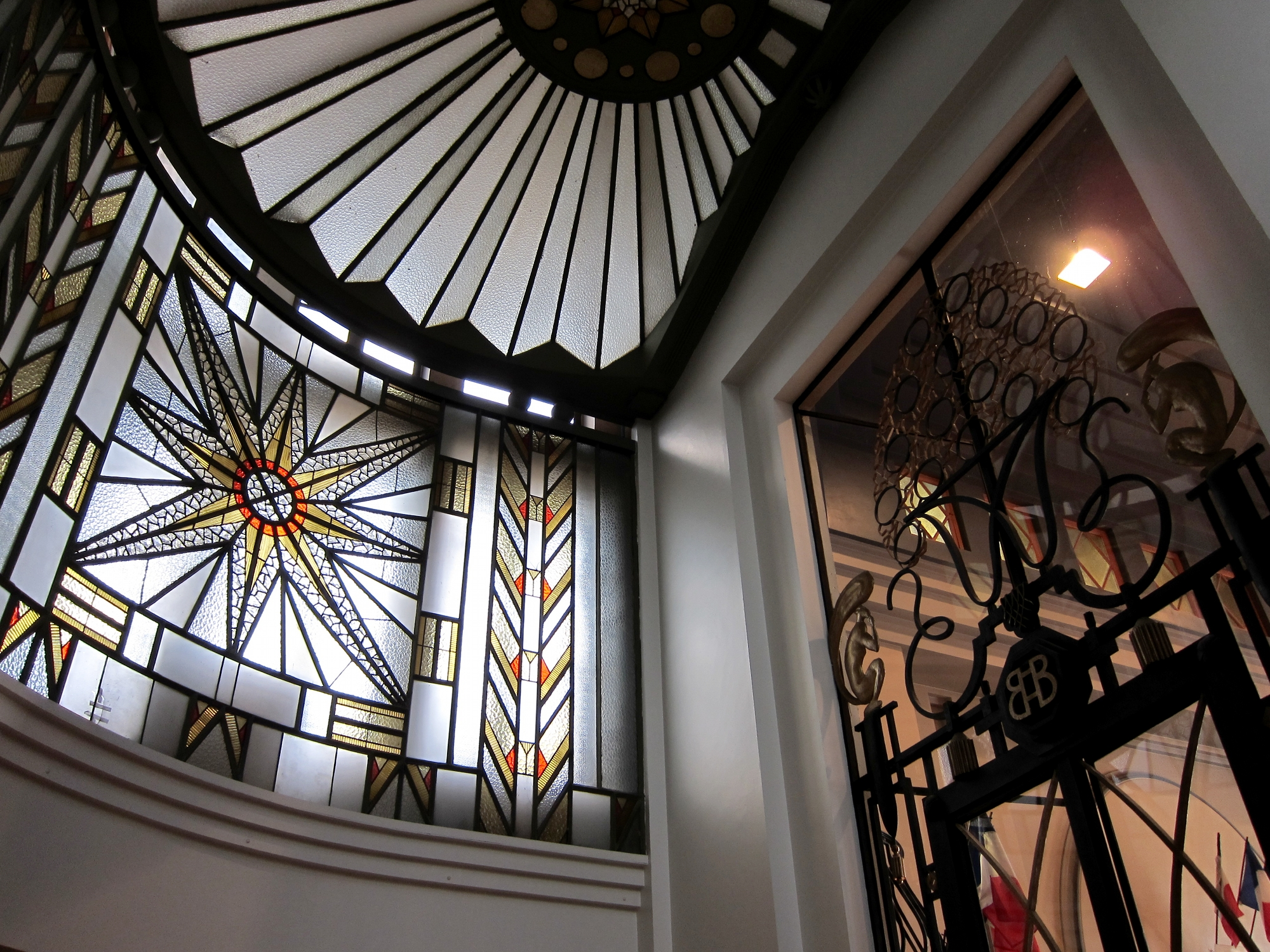
The stained glass dome

Early meetings of the local council were held in an ancient town hall on the southwest side of the Grand Place. It was rebuilt following a major fire in 1137 and again following another major fire in 1447. After it became dilapidated, the old town hall was replaced by a new building, designed in the neoclassical style, for which the foundation stone was laid on 5 October 1811. The design of that building involved a symmetrical main frontage of five bays facing onto the Grand Place. The ground floor, which was rusticated, featured three round headed openings with voussoirs and keystones, with two casement windows between the openings. The first floor was fenestrated by five rounded windows with imposts and moulded surrounds. The central section of three bays, which was slightly projected forward, was surmounted by a modillioned pediment with a coat of arms in the tympanum. There was a balustrade in front of the first-floor windows and there was a high parapet at roof level.

Over four days in May 1918, during the German spring offensive, most of the buildings in the Grand Place were destroyed by German shelling leaving only the belfry standing. The President of France, Raymond Poincaré, visited the site, surveyed the damage and awarded the Legion of Honour and the Croix de Guerre to the city, in recognition of the destruction it had suffered, on 28 December 1919.

In the early 1920s, the council decided to rebuild the Grand Place. The initial design, prepared by Louis Marie Cordonnier would have seen the belfry completely enclosed by a new town hall. After some debate, this idea was rejected by the council in favour of a solution which restored the town hall in its original location. A design competition was held, and Jacques Alleman was declared the winner in 1924. The new building was designed in the Art Deco style, built with a reinforced concrete frame and white stone cladding, and was officially opened by the mayor, Alexandre Ponnellle, on 7 April 1929.

The design involved a narrow main frontage, which was just 15 metres (49 ft) wide, facing onto the Grand Place. The building was rusticated on the ground floor and featured a semi-circular porch, which incorporated a round headed doorway with an archivolt and a keystone flanked by two oculi. On the first floor, there was a large recessed French door flanked by two statues and, beyond that, two pairs of Doric order columns supporting an entablature, a steep gable and a lantern. The building was 45 metres (148 ft) high. The carvings on the gable depicted the Legion of Honour and the Croix de Guerre which had been awarded to the city. Internally, the principal room was the main hall, which was lit by a stained glass dome.

Following the liberation of the town on 4 September 1944, during the Second World War, the chairman of the Provisional Government of the French Republic, General Charles de Gaulle, visited the town and gave a speech from the balcony of the town hall.

Works of art in the town hall include a bust of Maximilien de Béthune, Duke of Sully, who was a counsellor to King Henry IV.
