= Béthune =

Béthune Béthinne (Picard)
- Subprefecture and commune
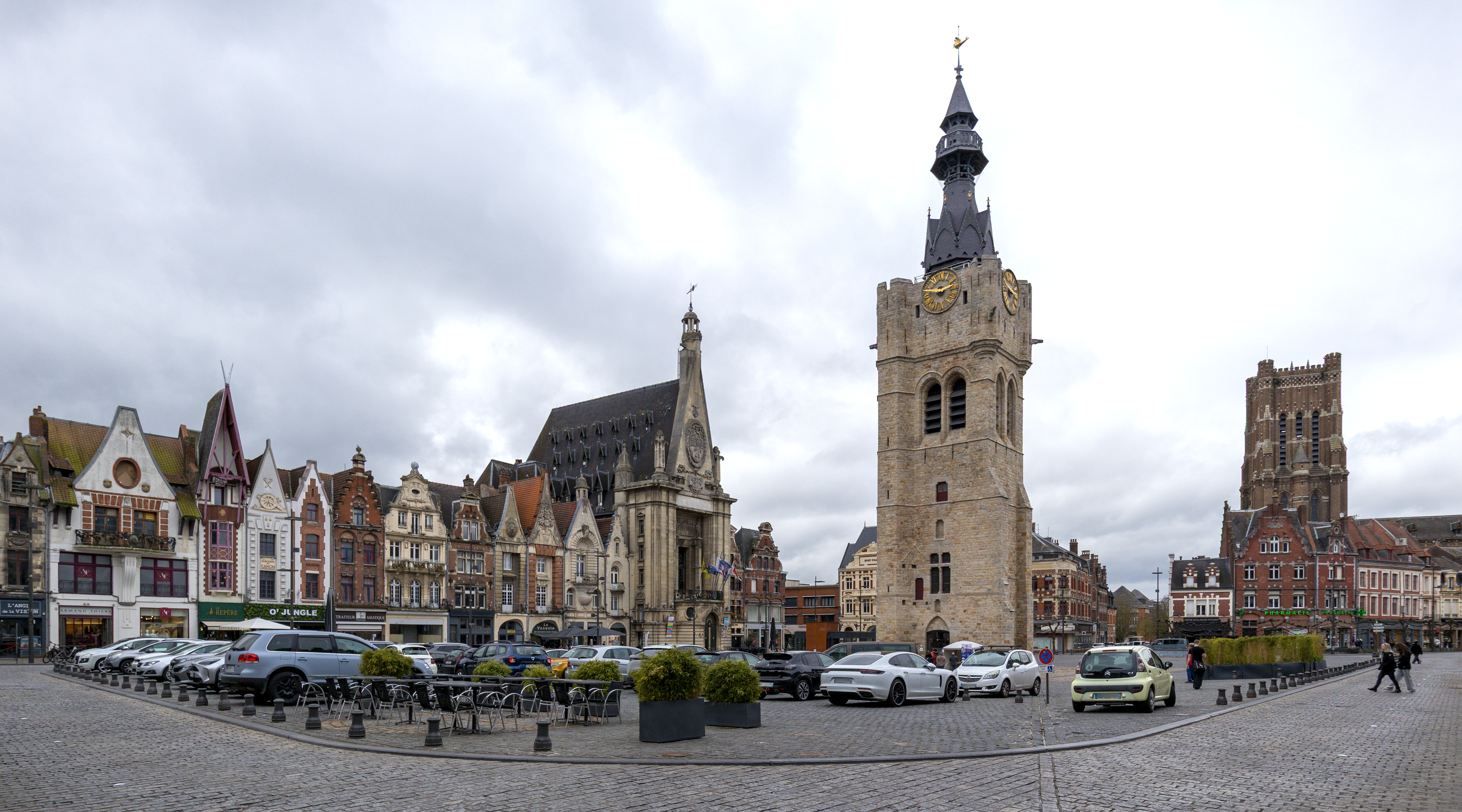
- Grand Place: the Hôtel de Ville on the left, the belfry in the centre and the Church of Saint-Vaast on the right

- Coat of arms
- Location of Béthune
- Location within France Location within Hauts-de-France
- Coordinates: 50°31′49″N 2°38′27″E
- Country: France
- Region: Hauts-de-France
- Department: Pas-de-Calais
- Arrondissement: Béthune
- Canton: Béthune
- Intercommunality: CA Béthune-Bruay, Artois-Lys Romane

Government
  - Mayor (2020–2026): Olivier Gacquerre
- Area^{1}: 9.43 km^{2} (3.64 sq mi)
- Elevation: 26 m (85 ft)
- Highest elevation: 42 m (138 ft)
- Lowest elevation: 18 m (59 ft)
- Population (2023): 25,224
  - Density: 2,670/km^{2} (6,930/sq mi)
- Time zone: UTC+01:00 (CET)
  - Summer (DST): UTC+02:00 (CEST)
- INSEE/Postal code: 62119 /62400
- ^{1} French Land Register data, which excludes lakes, ponds, glaciers > 1 km^{2} (0.386 sq mi or 247 acres) and river estuaries.

Béthune (French pronunciation: [betyn] ; Picard: Béthinne; archaic Dutch: Betun and Bethwyn historically in English) is a town in northern France, sub-prefecture of the Pas-de-Calais department.

== Geography ==
Béthune is located in the former province of Artois. It is situated 73 kilometres (45 miles) south-east of Calais, 33 kilometres (21 miles) west of Lille, and 186 kilometres (116 miles) north of Paris.

== Landmarks ==
Béthune is a town rich in architectural heritage and history. It has, among other features, a large paved square with shops, cafés, and a 47-metre-tall (154 ft) (133 steps) belfry standing in the center from the top of which the Belgian border can be seen. The chime of the belfry is composed of thirty-six bells. A belfry has stood on the site since 1346. The current belfry plays melodies every 15 minutes, including the ch'ti (regional patois) children's lullaby "min p'tit quinquin" (my little darling). In 2005, the belfry was inscribed on the UNESCO World Heritage List as part of the Belfries of Belgium and France site, because of its architecture and testimony to the rise of municipal power in Europe.

== History ==
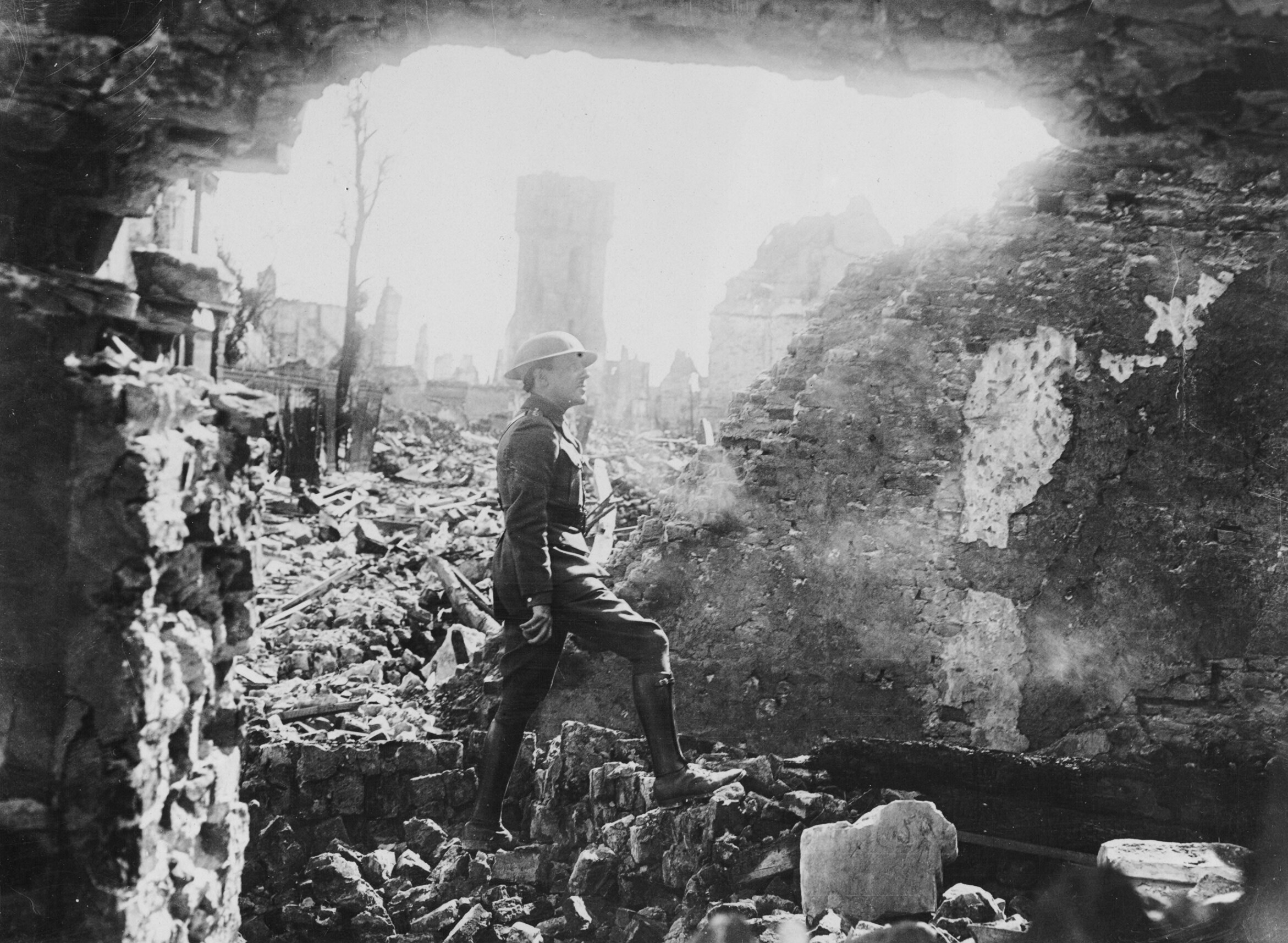
Béthune after the German bombardment of May 1918

Hugh Hastings (died 1347), King Edward III of England's captain and lieutenant in Flanders, mounted an attack and laid siege to Béthune, with a combined English and Flemish force, during a diversionary raid as part of Chevauchée of Edward III of 1346. The Flemish component proved undisciplined and the siege was abandoned in failure before the end of August.

During the War of the Spanish Succession in July–August 1710, Béthune was besieged by forces of the Grand Alliance. The town eventually surrendered after a vigorous defence conducted by Antoine de Vauban (1654–1731), a relative of the famous military engineer Vauban.

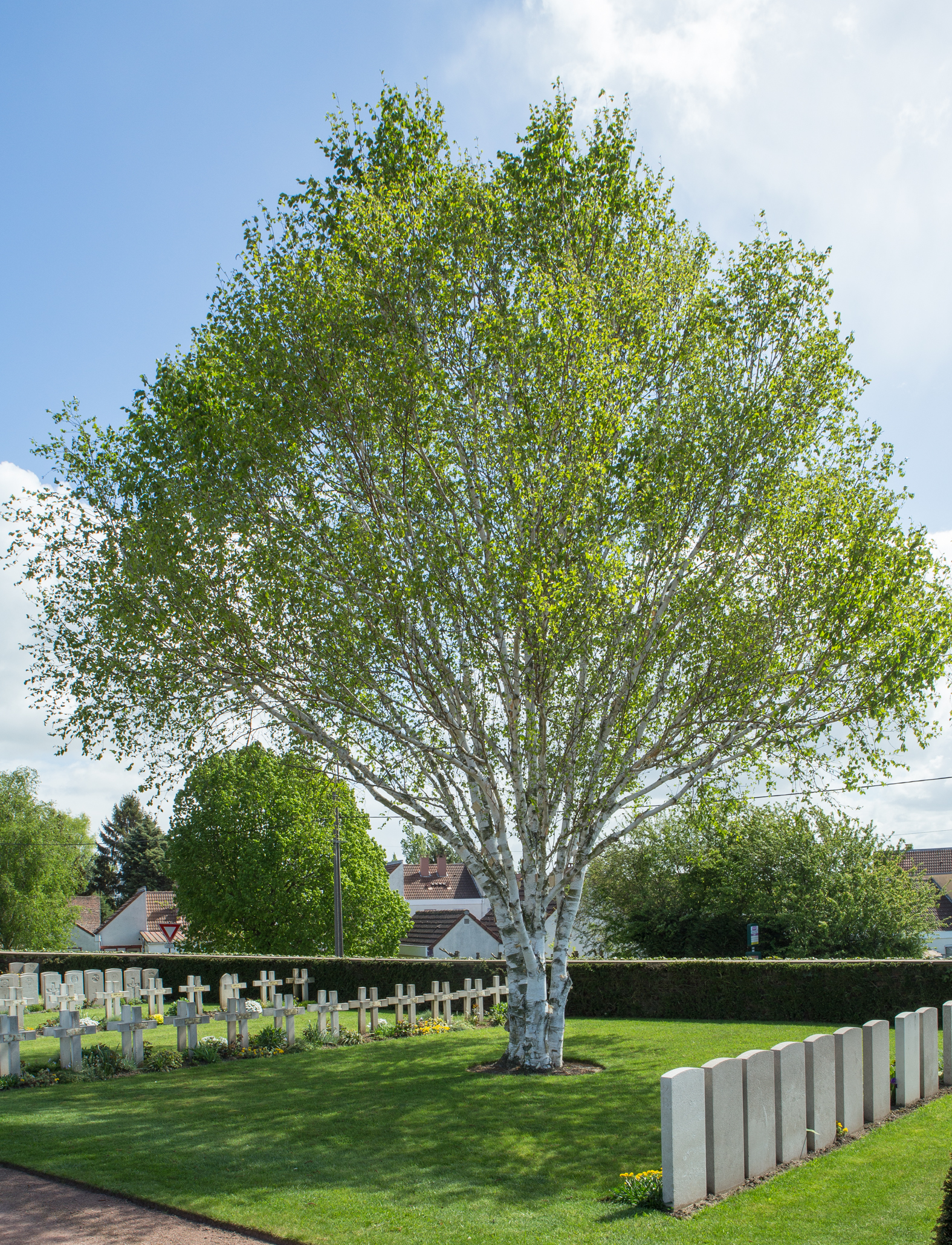
Béthune British Military Cemetery

In World War I, Béthune was an important railway junction and command centre for the British Canadian Corps and Indian Expeditionary Force, as well as the 33rd Casualty Station until December 1917. It initially suffered little damage until the second phase of the Ludendorff Offensive in April 1918, when German forces reached Locon, 5 km (3 mi) away. On 21 May, a bombardment destroyed large parts of the town, killing more than 100 civilians. Over 3,200 casualties are buried in Béthune Town Cemetery, the Commonwealth section of which was designed by Edwin Lutyens; the majority are British (2,933) or Canadian (55), the remainder German.

Rebuilt after the war (the rebuilding of the Hôtel de Ville was completed in 1929), Béthune was badly damaged once more by air attacks and house to house fighting on 24–26 May 1940 when it was captured by the SS Panzer Division Totenkopf. The Totenkopf suffered heavy casualties and anger at their losses allegedly played a role in the Le Paradis massacre on 27 May, when 97 members of the Royal Norfolk Regiment were shot after surrendering. During the war, many townspeople were deported to work in Germany; the town was officially liberated on 4 September 1944.

== Transport ==
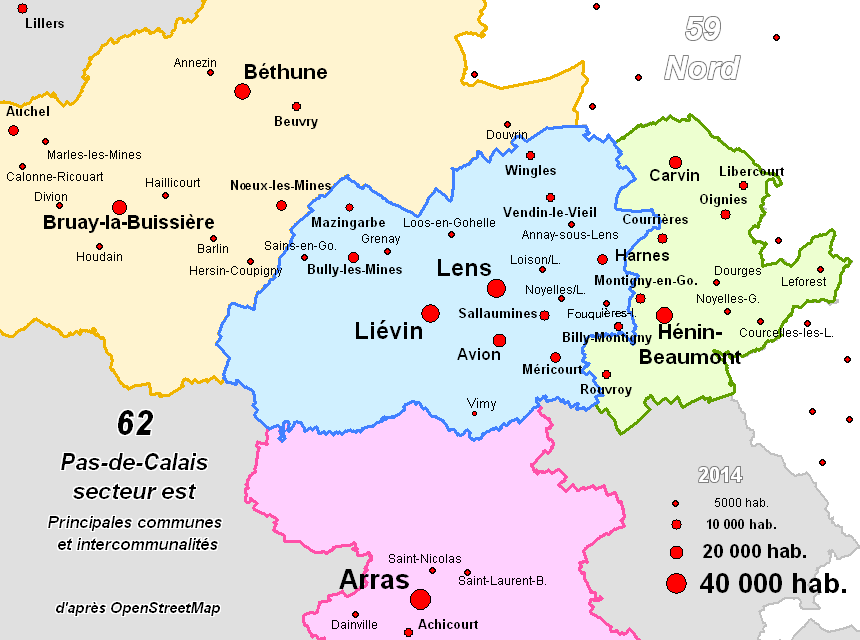
East of Pas-de-Calais (Béthune, Lens, Hénin-Beaumont)

Béthune station has seven daily TGV trains to Paris, a journey which takes 1 hour 15 minutes. There are also regular trains to Lille, Amiens, Dunkerque and several regional destinations.

Béthune is served by the Lens-Béthune bus network.

By car, Béthune is accessible from the A26 which intersects the A1 (Lille to Paris) 42 kilometres (26 miles) to the south-east. By road, it is 2 hours 30 minutes from Paris, 1 hour from Calais, 30 minutes from Arras and 40 minutes from Lille. By using the Channel Tunnel and the A26, Béthune is 3 hours 30 minutes from London and 6 hours 45 minutes from Manchester. Using road connections on mainland Europe it is nearly 2 hours from Brussels, 3 hours from Aix-La-Chapelle, 3 hours from Cologne, 8 hours 30 minutes from Berlin and 3 hours 30 minutes from Amsterdam.

== Population ==
The inhabitants are called Béthunois in French.

Historical population

Year	Pop.	±% p.a.
1793	6,932	—
1800	6,046	−1.93%
1806	6,379	+0.90%
1821	6,319	−0.06%
1831	6,889	+0.87%
1836	6,805	−0.25%
1841	7,448	+1.82%
1846	7,727	+0.74%
1851	7,692	−0.09%
1856	7,720	+0.07%
1861	8,264	+1.37%
1866	8,178	−0.21%
1872	8,410	+0.47%
1876	9,315	+2.59%
1881	10,374	+2.18%
1886	10,917	+1.03%
1891	11,098	+0.33%
1896	11,627	+0.94%
1901	12,404	+1.30%

Year	Pop.	±% p.a.
1906	13,607	+1.87%
1911	15,309	+2.39%
1921	16,795	+0.93%
1926	20,141	+3.70%
1931	19,956	−0.18%
1936	20,073	+0.12%
1946	22,081	+0.96%
1954	22,376	+0.17%
1962	23,445	+0.59%
1968	27,154	+2.48%
1975	26,982	−0.09%
1982	25,508	−0.80%
1990	24,556	−0.47%
1999	27,808	+1.39%
2007	25,982	−0.85%
2012	25,694	−0.22%
2017	24,895	−0.63%
2023	25,224	+0.22%

Source: EHESS and INSEE (1968–2023)

== Notable people ==
Béthune was the birthplace of:

- Jean Buridan, philosopher
- Antoine Busnois, composer and poet of the early Renaissance
- Jérôme Leroy, former captain of RC Lens and current FC Sochaux midfielder in France
- Pierre de Manchicourt, Renaissance composer
- Nicolas Fauvergue, footballer
- Thomas Crecquillon, the Renaissance composer, probably died here.
- Tristan Charpentier, racing driver

Béthune is also associated with the following historic personalities:

- Maximilien de Béthune, duc de Sully, general and statesman
- Conon de Béthune, crusader and trouvère poet

== Sport ==
Stade Béthunois Football Club represent Béthune and was formed in 1902. They currently play in Nord-Pas-de-Calais league.

== Twin towns and sister cities ==
Béthune is twinned with:

- Schwerte, Germany
- Hastings, United Kingdom since 1972.
- Sully-sur-Loire, France
- Kortrijk, Belgium

== Gallery ==
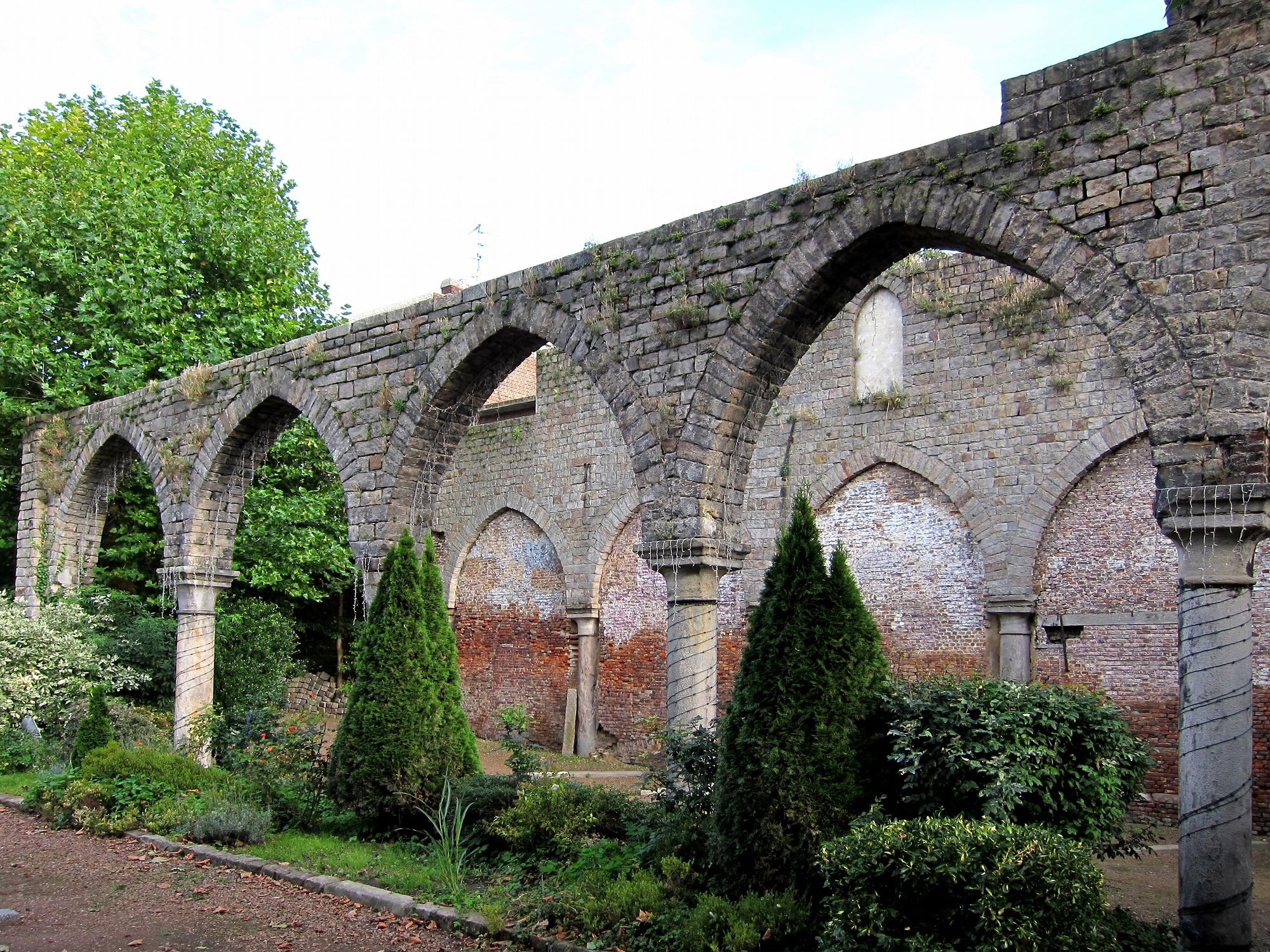

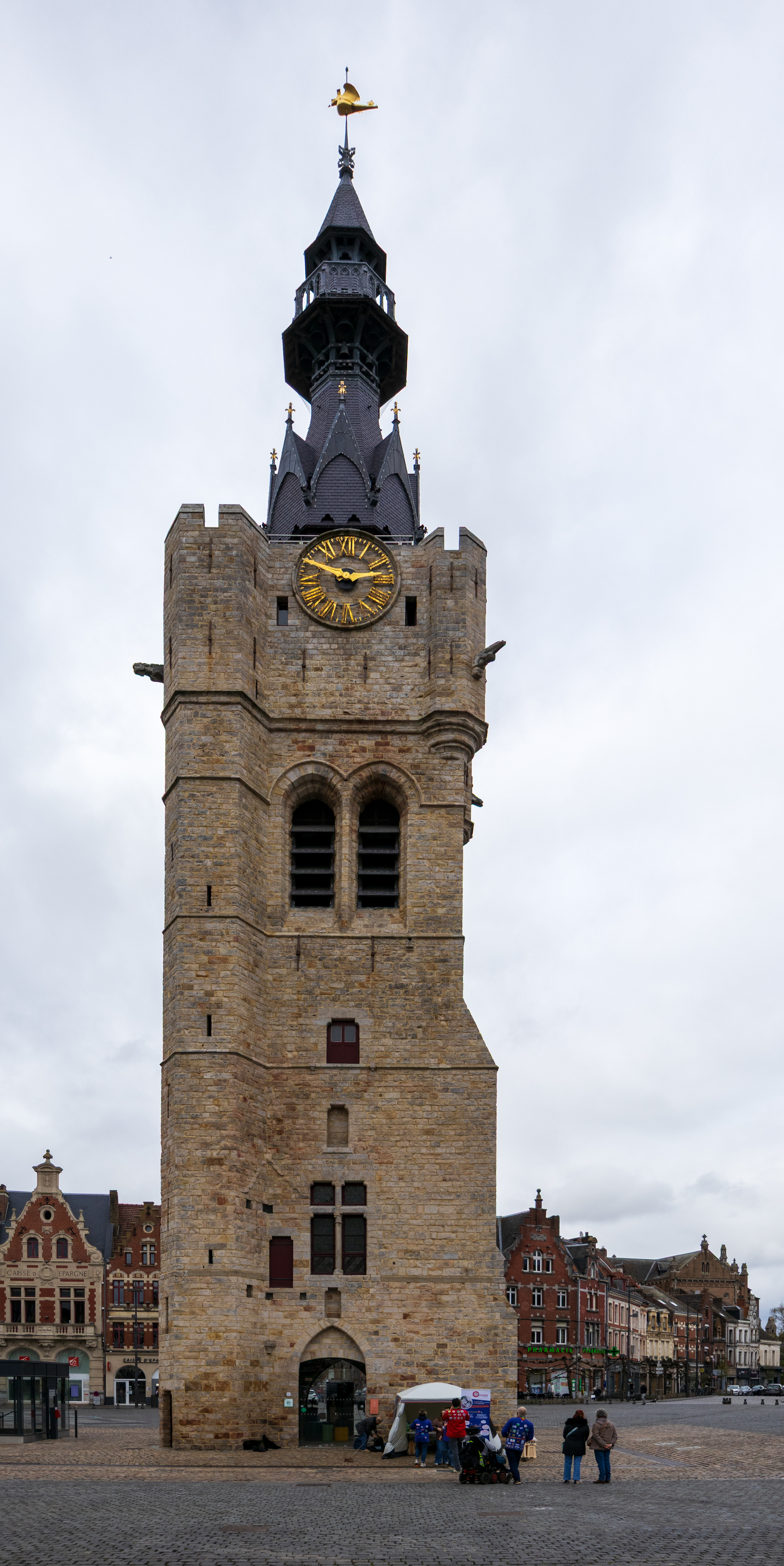

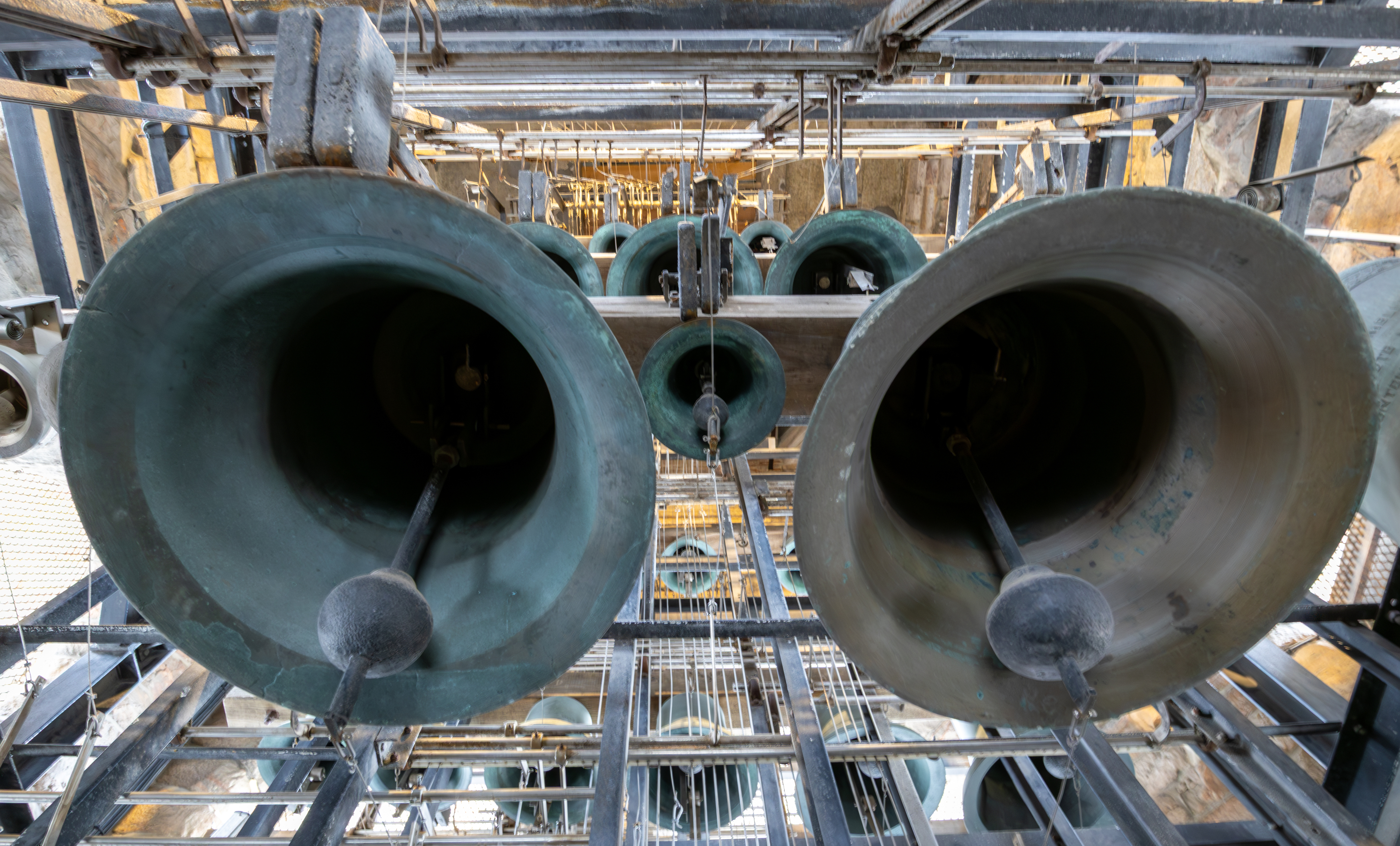

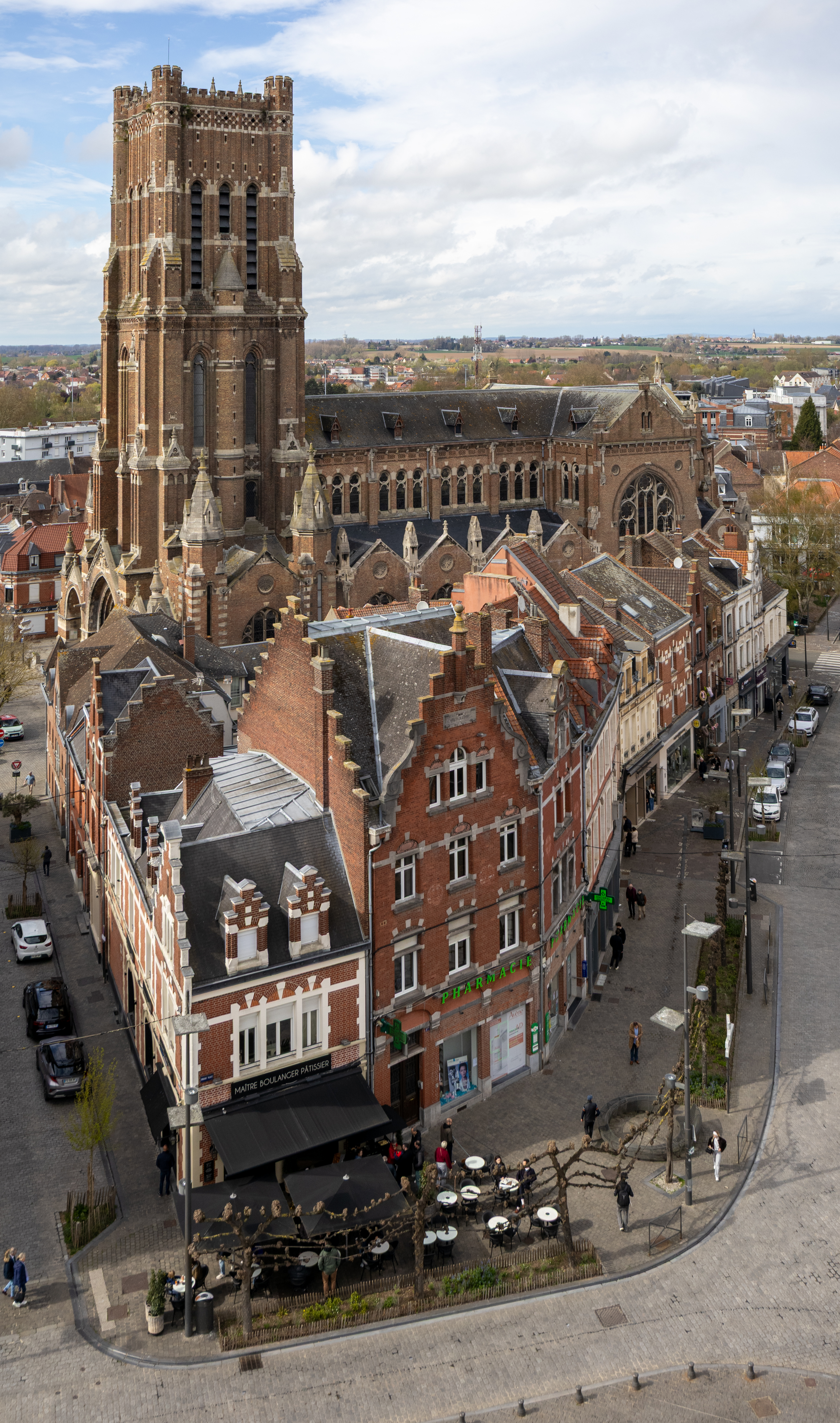

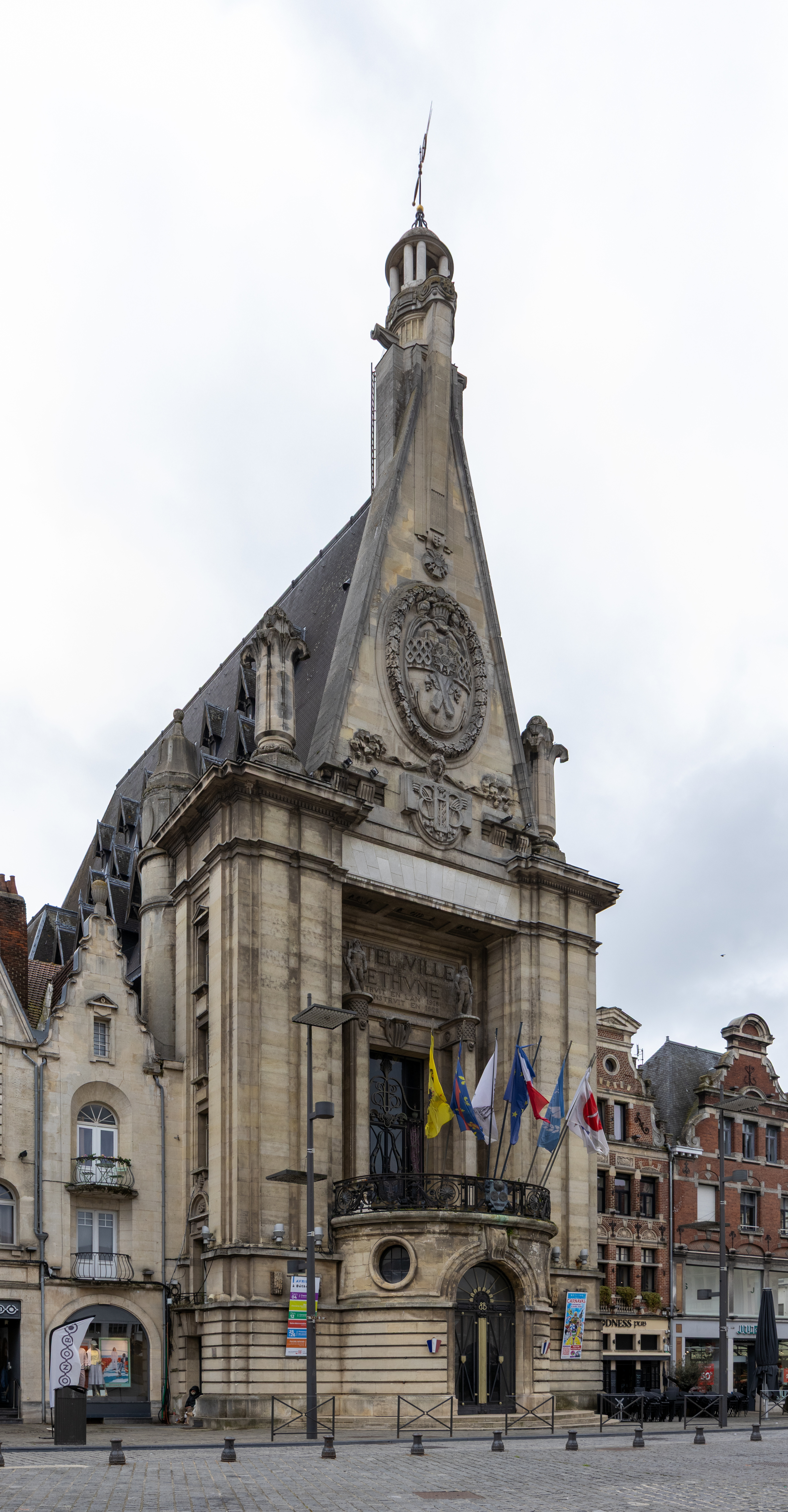

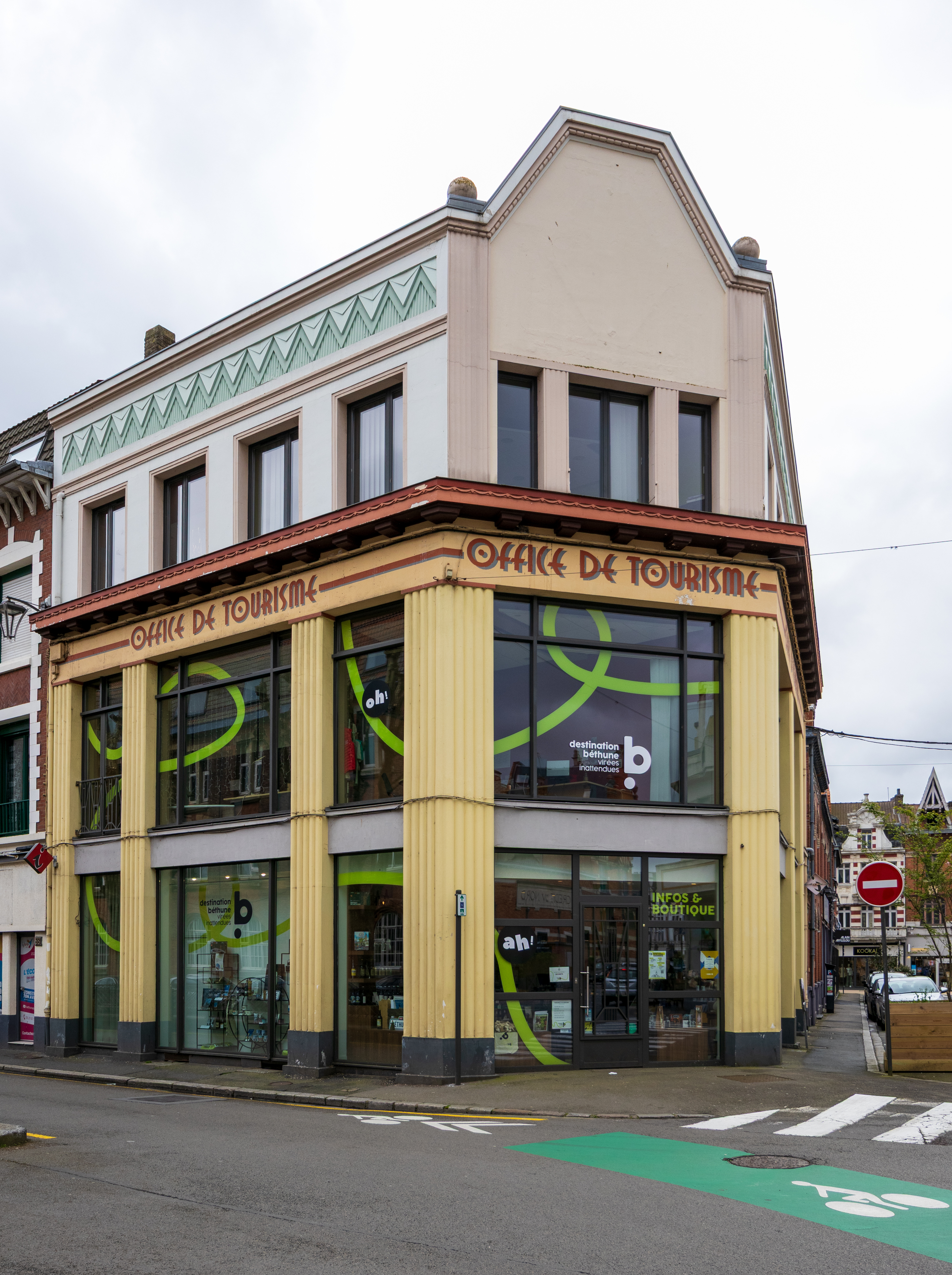

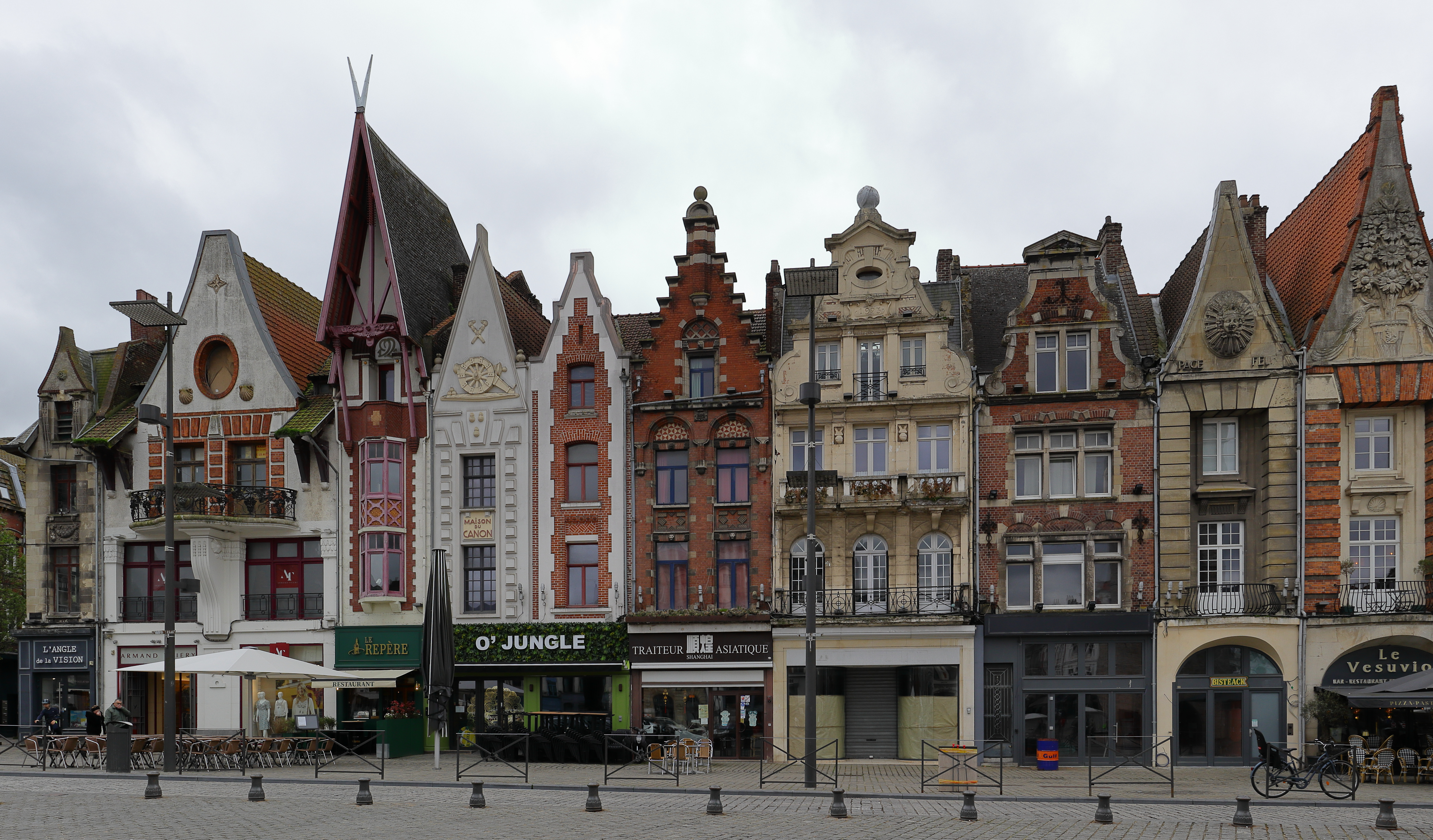

== See also ==
- Communes of the Pas-de-Calais department
