= Hôtel de Ville, Lens =

Town hall in Lens, France

Hôtel de Ville
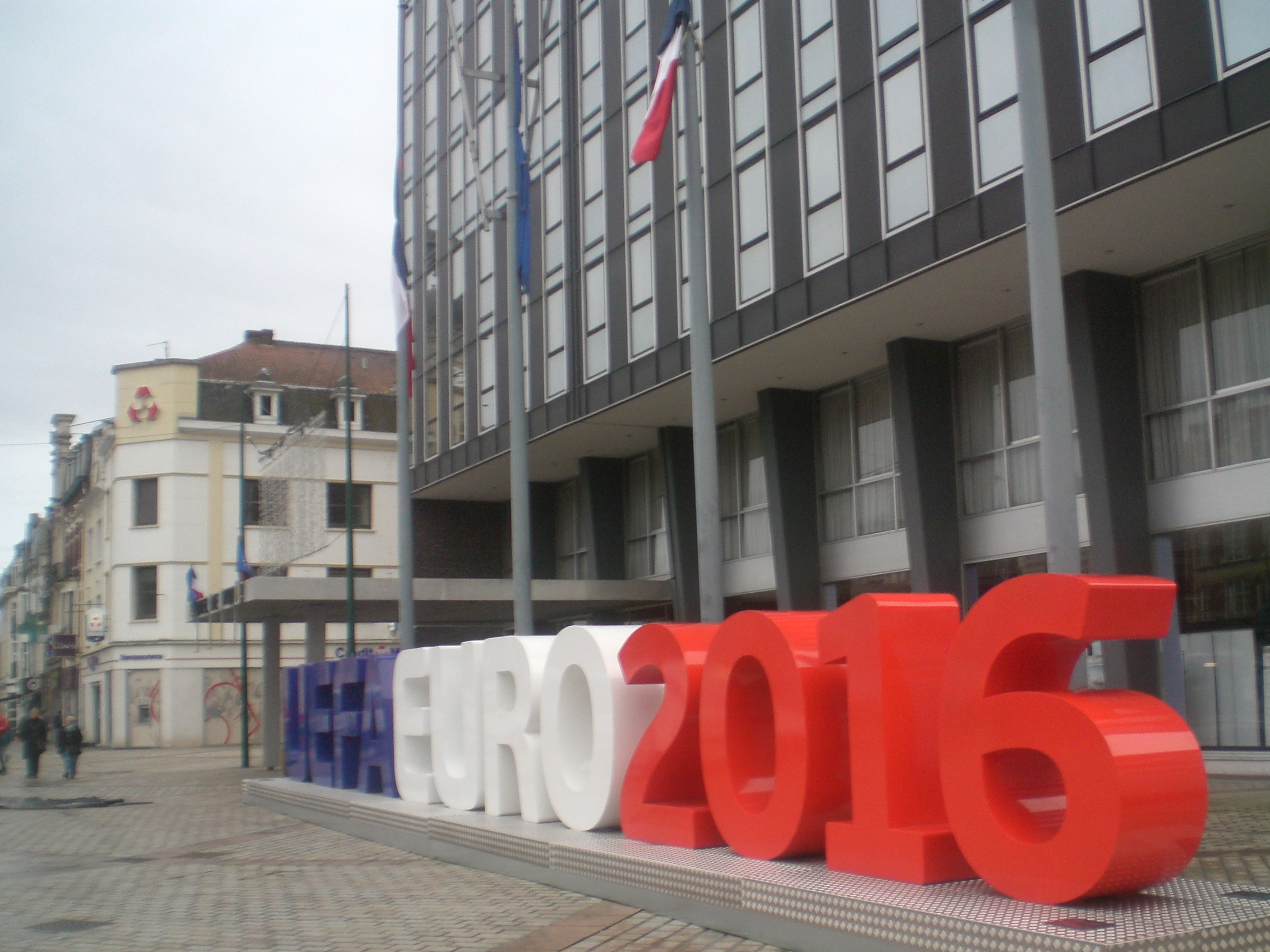
- The main frontage of the Hôtel de Ville in November 2015
- Interactive map of the Hôtel de Ville area

General information
- Type: City hall
- Architectural style: Modern style
- Location: Lens, France
- Coordinates: 50.4288°N 2.8317°E
- Completed: 1965

Height
- Height: 28 meters (92 ft)

Design and construction
- Architect: Jean de Mailly

The Hôtel de Ville (French pronunciation: [otɛl də vil], City Hall) is a historic building in Lens, Pas-de-Calais, northern France, standing on the Place Jean Jaurès.

== History ==
=== The first town hall ===
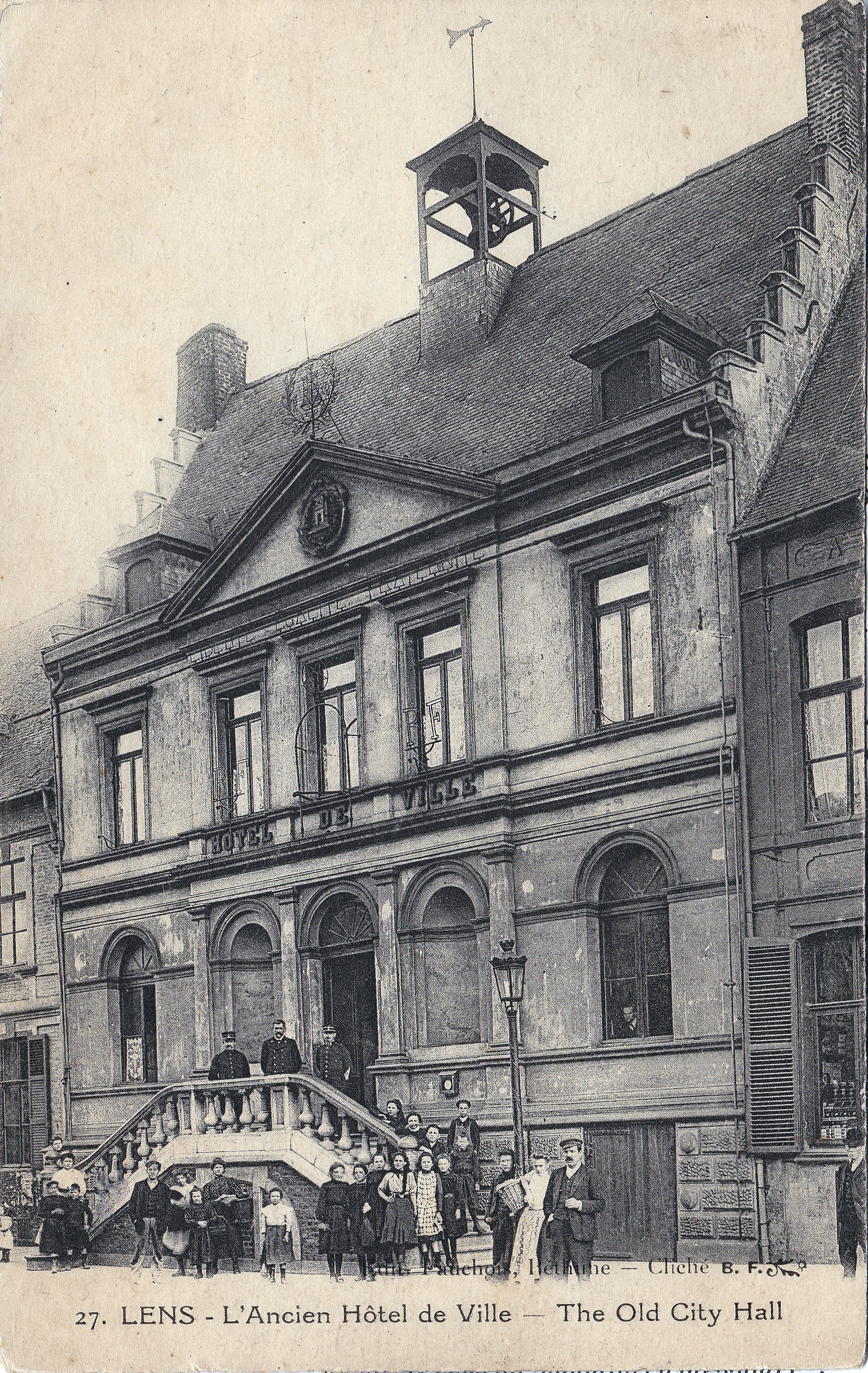
The first town hall

In the early 19th century, the town council decided to commission a town hall. The site it selected was on the south side of the main square, now known as Place Jean Jaurès, just to the west of the l'Église Saint-Léger. It was designed in the neoclassical style, built in ashlar stone and was completed in 1822.

The design involved a symmetrical main frontage of five bays facing onto the main square. The central section of three bays, which was slightly projected forward, featured a short flight of steps leading up to a round headed doorway with a fanlight flanked by two niches; there were three casement windows on the first floor. The bays in the central section were flanked by Doric order pilasters on both floors: the ground floor pilasters supported an entablature, while the first floor pilasters supported another entablature and a modillioned pediment. The outer bays were fenestrated by round headed windows on the ground floor and by casement windows on the first floor. There were two small dormer windows and a central belfry at roof level. The flight of steps was removed and replaced by a forestair in August 1908.

=== The second town hall ===
In the early 20th century, following significant population growth associated with the local coal mining industry, the town council, led by the mayor, Émile Basly, decided to demolish the old building and to erect a more elaborate structure. The foundation stone for the second town hall was laid on 27 May 1913. The new building was designed by Jean Goniaux in the Baroque style, built in red brick with stone finishings and was completed in late 1914.

The design again involved a symmetrical main frontage of five bays facing onto Place Jean Jaurès. The central section of three bays featured three round headed doors flanked by piers supporting imposts and voussoirs. On the first floor, there were three mullioned and transomed windows leading out onto a balustraded balcony. The outer bays were fenestrated by pairs of squared headed windows surmounted by pairs of segmental headed windows on the ground floor, and by pairs of casement windows leading out onto ornate semi-circular balconies on the first floor. At roof level, there was a cornice and a parapet, two dormer windows and a central dormer-style panel with a clock face surmounted by a pediment and finials. There was also an imposing central belfry. The statues on either side of the clock and the caryatids on the semi-circular balconies were all designed by the sculptor, Augustin Lesieux, while the stained glass windows were the work of Alfred Labille.

Internally, the principal room was the council chamber which featured a mural of the coronation of Maria Godart as the miners' muse, i.e. their heroine, in 1913.

The second town hall was destroyed by a German mine in April 1917 during the First World War. Such was the devastation that the president, Raymond Poincaré, awarded the town the Legion of Honour during a visit in December 1919. The second town hall was then rebuilt, using the original plans, in the same style and officially re-opened in 1927. The town hall was then badly damaged again by allied bombing in June 1944 during the Second World War. The allied offensive left 500 people dead and 1,000 buildings completely destroyed in Lens.

=== The third town hall ===
In 1956, the town council decided to demolish the ruins of the second town hall, and to commission a new town hall on the same site. The initial proposal was to rebuild the second town hall in the same style. However, this proposal was opposed, most insensitively, by the Houilleres du Bassin et du Pas-de-Calais (en: Coal mines of Bassin and Pas-de-Calais) who wanted to exploit a rich seam of coal under the site.

The third town hall was designed by Jean de Mailly in the modern style, built in concrete and glass, and was officially opened by the French member of parliament, Ernest Schaffner, on 14 February 1965. The structure consisted of a six-storey tower sitting on a two-storey podium. The tower was 28 meters (92 ft) high and featured alternating columns of windows and dark cladding. A major programme of works, which involved creating a new glass foyer on the front of the podium, was carried out to a design by ADFL Architecture in 2019.
