= Lens, Pas-de-Calais =

Lens Linse (Picard)
- Subprefecture and commune
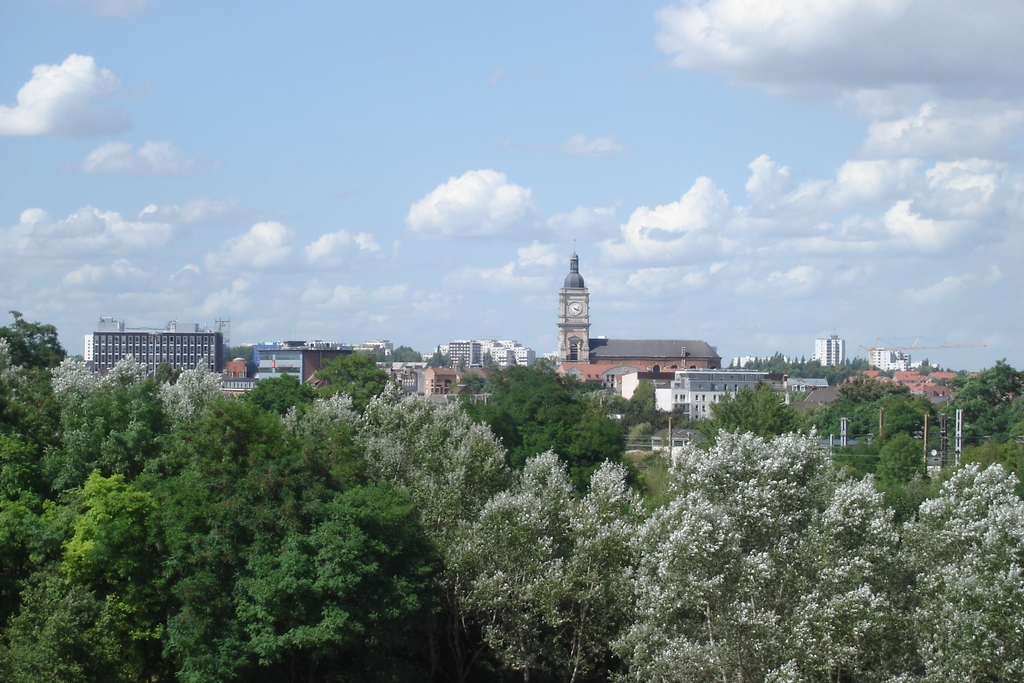

- Flag Coat of arms

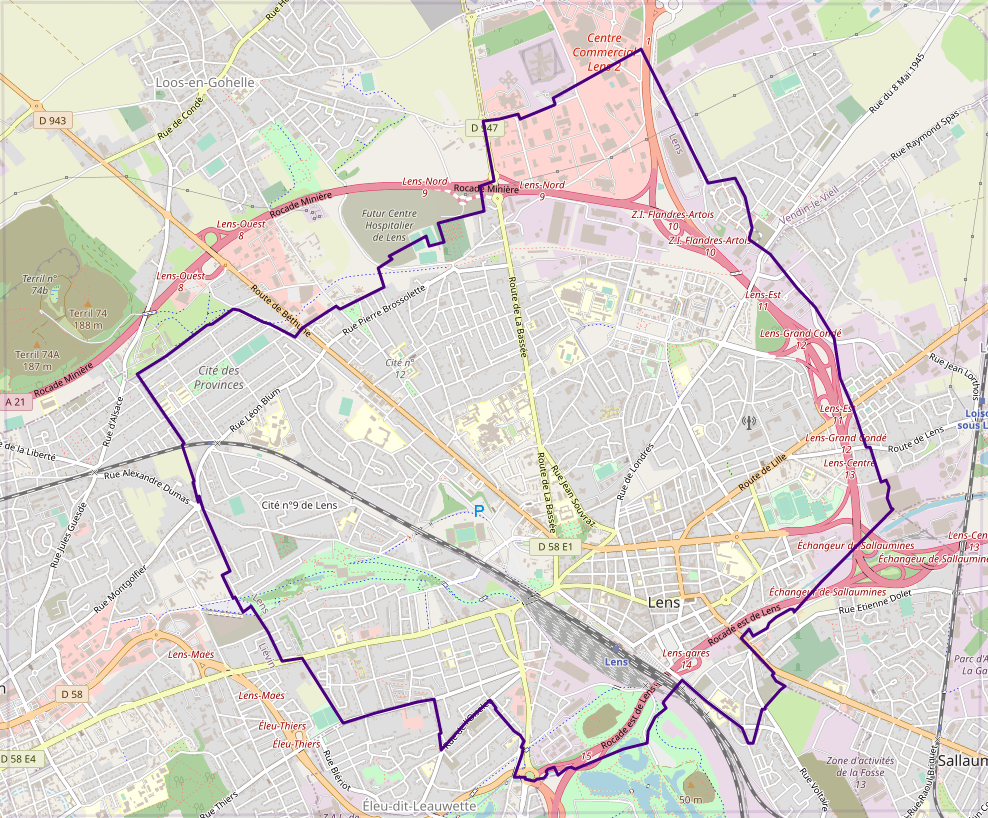
- Location of Lens
- Location within France Location within Hauts-de-France
- Coordinates: 50°25′56″N 2°50′00″E
- Country: France
- Region: Hauts-de-France
- Department: Pas-de-Calais
- Arrondissement: Lens
- Canton: Lens
- Intercommunality: CA Lens-Liévin

Government
  - Mayor (2026–32): Sylvain Robert
- Area^{1}: 11.70 km^{2} (4.52 sq mi)
- Highest elevation: 71 m (233 ft)
- Lowest elevation: 27 m (89 ft)
- Population (2023): 32,920
  - Density: 2,814/km^{2} (7,287/sq mi)
- Time zone: UTC+01:00 (CET)
  - Summer (DST): UTC+02:00 (CEST)
- INSEE/Postal code: 62498 /62300
- ^{1} French Land Register data, which excludes lakes, ponds, glaciers > 1 km^{2} (0.386 sq mi or 247 acres) and river estuaries.

Lens (French pronunciation: [lɑ̃s]; Picard: Linse) is a city in the Pas-de-Calais department in northern France. It is one of the main towns of Hauts-de-France along with Lille, Valenciennes, Amiens, Roubaix, Tourcoing, Arras and Douai. The inhabitants are called Lensois (pronounced [lɑ̃swa]).

== Metropolitan area ==
Lens belongs to the intercommunality of Lens-Liévin, which consists of 36 communes, with a total population of 242,000. Lens, along with Douai and 65 other communes, forms the agglomeration (unité urbaine) of Douai-Lens, whose population as of 2018 was 504,281.

== History ==
Lens was initially a fortification from the Norman invasions. In 1180, it was owned by the Count of Flanders, and sovereignty was exercised by the Crown of France. In the 13th century, Lens received a charter from Louis VIII of France, allowing it to become a city. The Flemish razed the city in 1303. Prior to this, the city's population relied on its markets. In 1526, Lens was made part of the Spanish Netherlands under the ownership of the French monarchy, and only passed back to France on 7 November 1659 with the Treaty of the Pyrenees.

In 1849, coal was discovered in Lens after surveys were carried out at Annay, Courrières and Loos-en-Gohelle. This led to the expansion of the city into an important industrial center as part of the Nord-Pas de Calais Mining Basin. The Lens Mining Company was founded in 1852 and experienced large profits. The city, occupied from 1914 to 1918, was largely destroyed in the First World War and its population of 18,000 fell by half. In World War II, the Allies bombarded the city from the air, leaving 500 dead and 1,000 buildings destroyed. A new Hôtel de Ville was erected in 1965.

The last coal mine in Lens closed in 1986. The Nord-Pas de Calais Mining Basin was made a UNESCO Heritage site in 2012, and the Louvre-Lens art museum was opened the same year.

== Education ==
Lens is the site of one of the five campuses of the University of Artois.

== Transport ==
The Lens railway station, built in 1927, is served by regional trains towards Lille, Arras, Douai, Dunkirk, Calais and Valenciennes. It is also connected to the TGV network, with high speed trains to Paris. It is served by the Lens-Béthune bus network, with bus services running across Lens and connecting it to nearby towns. The nearest airport is Lille Airport, which located 33 km (21 mi) north east of Lens. However, the airport provides direct routes to other parts of France, Europe and Morocco. The nearest major airports are Brussels Airport, located 158 km (98 mi) and Paris Charles de Gaulle Airport, located 179 km (111 mi) south of Lens.

== Sport ==
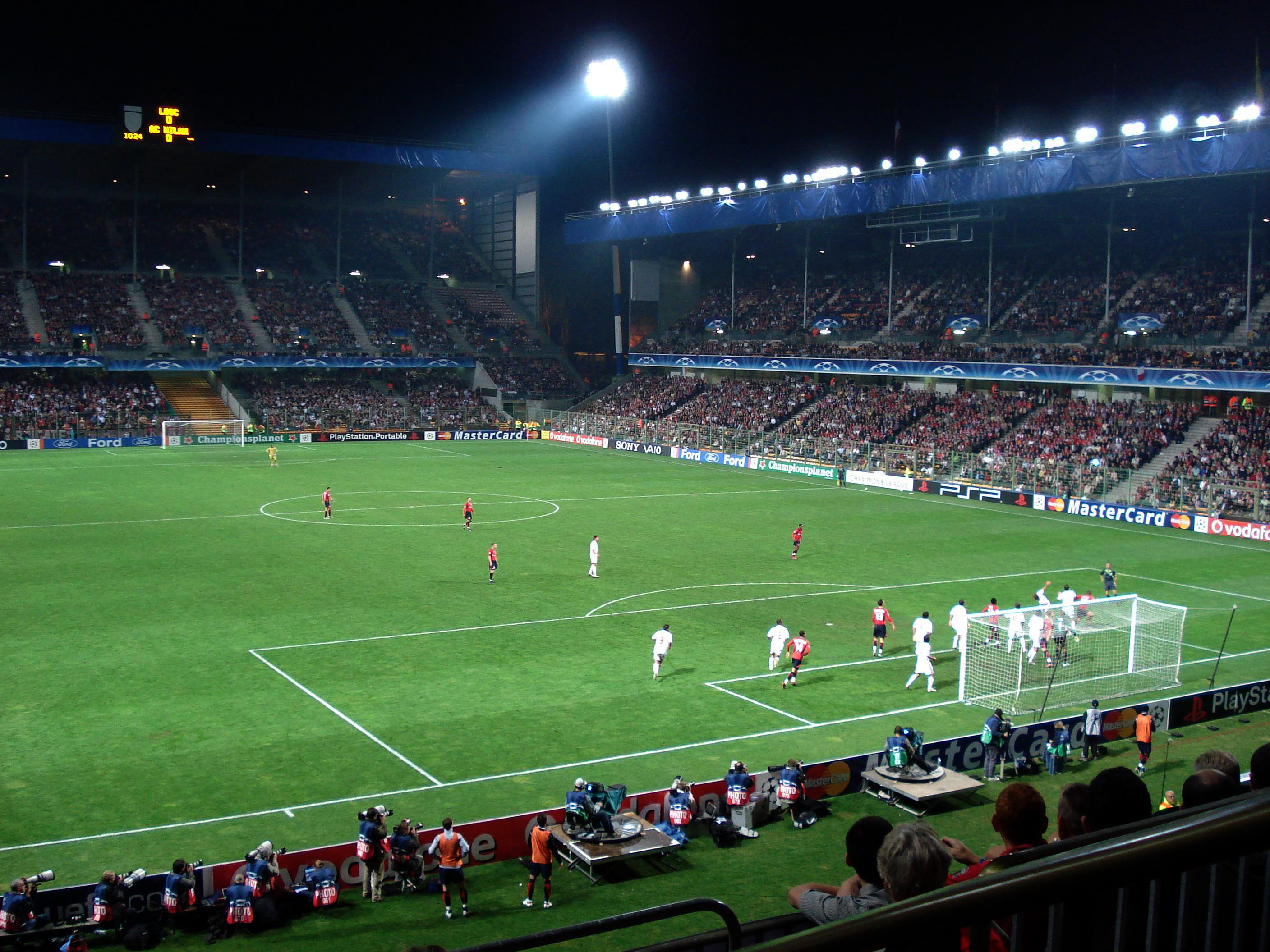
Stade Bollaert-Delelis

Football club RC Lens plays in the town. Their stadium, Stade Bollaert-Delelis, was used for UEFA Euro 1984, the 1998 FIFA World Cup and UEFA Euro 2016 and the 1999 Rugby World Cup and the 2007 Rugby World Cup.

== Population ==
Historical population

Year	Pop.	±% p.a.
1793	2,081	—
1800	2,365	+1.84%
1806	2,316	−0.35%
1821	2,381	+0.18%
1831	2,551	+0.69%
1836	2,645	+0.73%
1841	2,673	+0.21%
1846	2,807	+0.98%
1851	2,796	−0.08%
1856	3,341	+3.63%
1861	4,506	+6.17%
1866	5,738	+4.95%
1872	7,298	+4.09%
1876	9,383	+6.48%
1881	10,515	+2.30%
1886	11,780	+2.30%
1891	13,862	+3.31%
1896	17,227	+4.44%
1901	24,370	+7.18%

Year	Pop.	±% p.a.
1906	27,744	+2.63%
1911	31,812	+2.77%
1921	14,259	−7.71%
1926	30,155	+16.16%
1931	33,513	+2.13%
1936	32,730	−0.47%
1946	34,342	+0.48%
1954	40,753	+2.16%
1962	42,590	+0.55%
1968	41,874	−0.28%
1975	40,199	−0.58%
1982	38,244	−0.71%
1990	35,017	−1.10%
1999	36,206	+0.37%
2007	36,011	−0.07%
2012	32,663	−1.93%
2017	31,415	−0.78%
2023	32,920	+0.78%

Source: EHESS and INSEE (1968-2023)

== Gallery ==
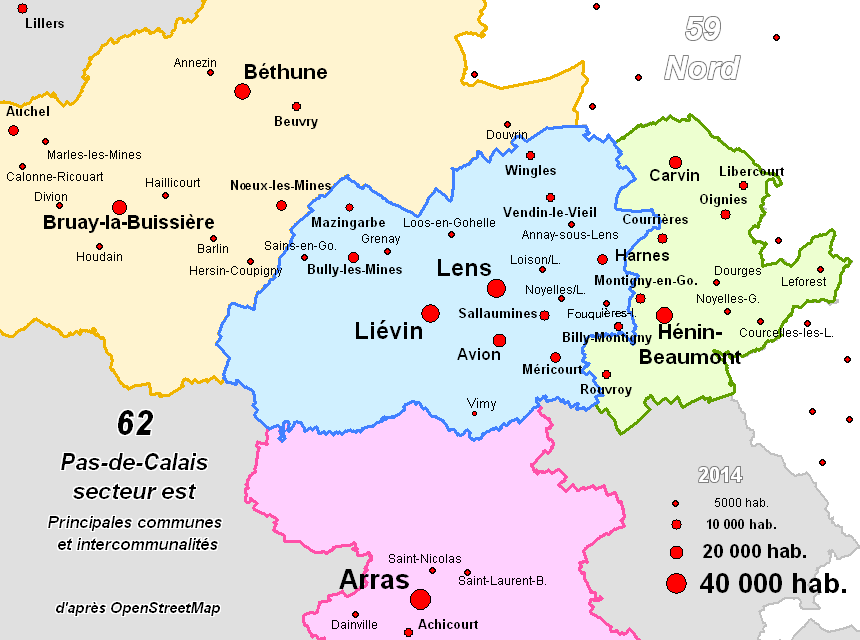
East of Pas-de-Calais (Béthune, Lens, Hénin-Beaumont)

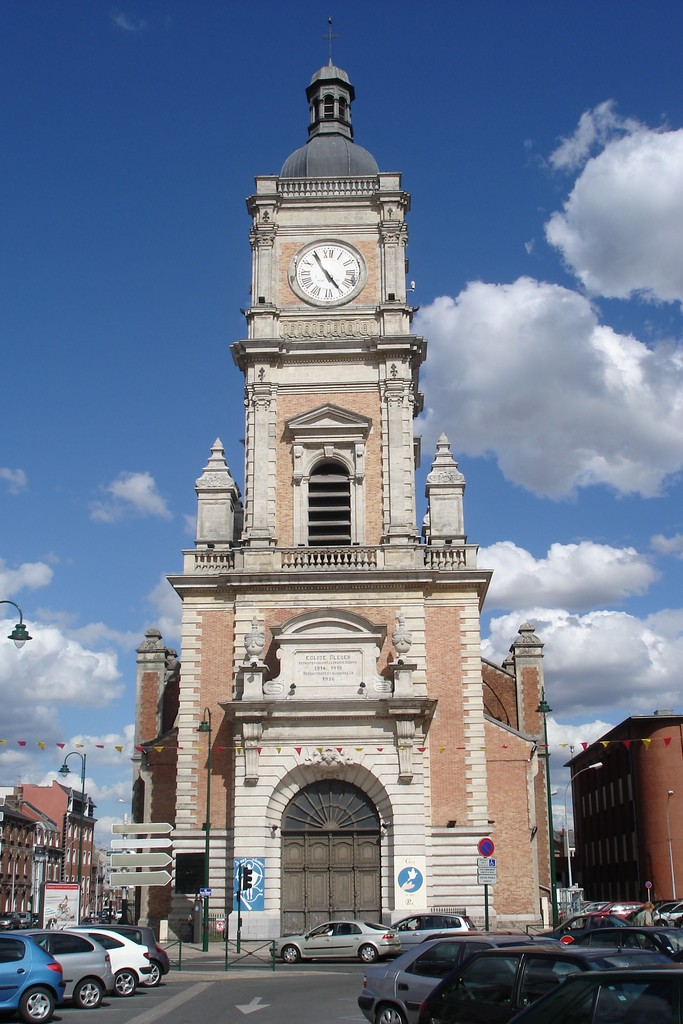
Lens church

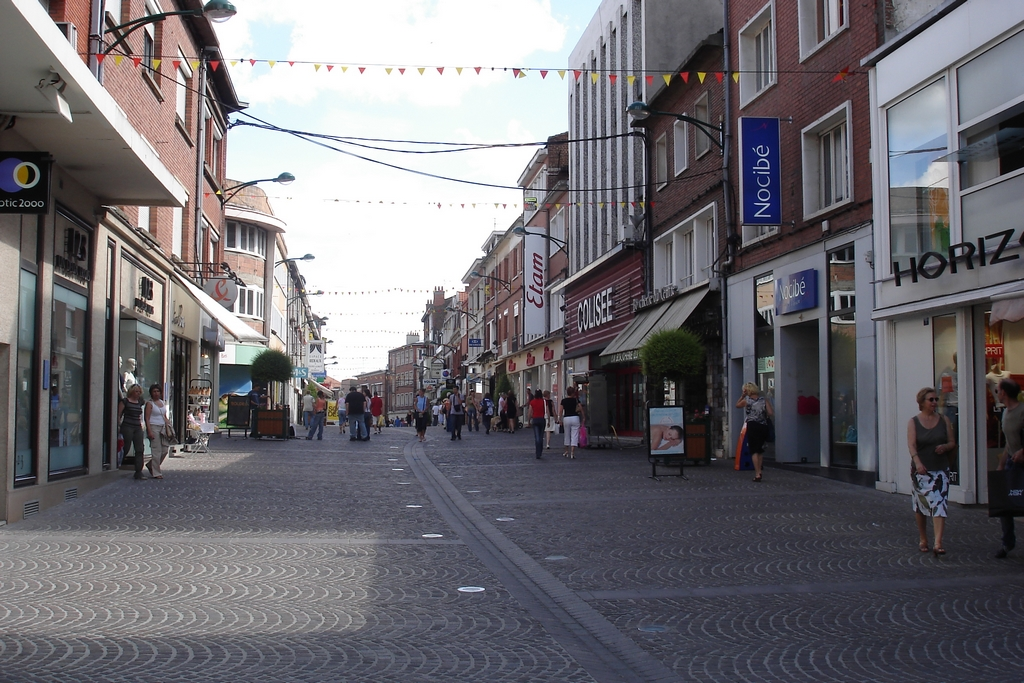
Main shopping district

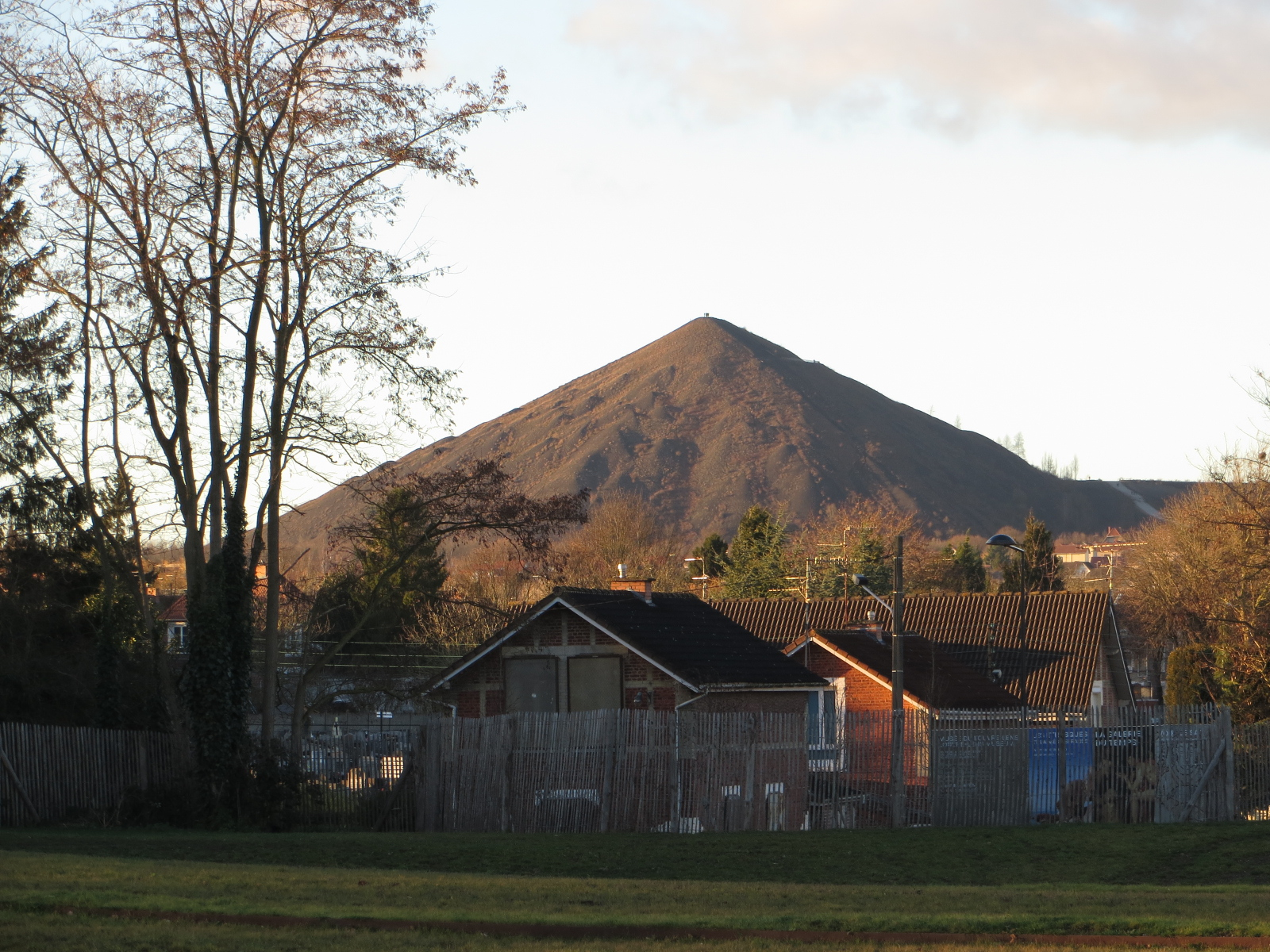
One of the many cone-shaped coal tips that litter the landscape near Lens

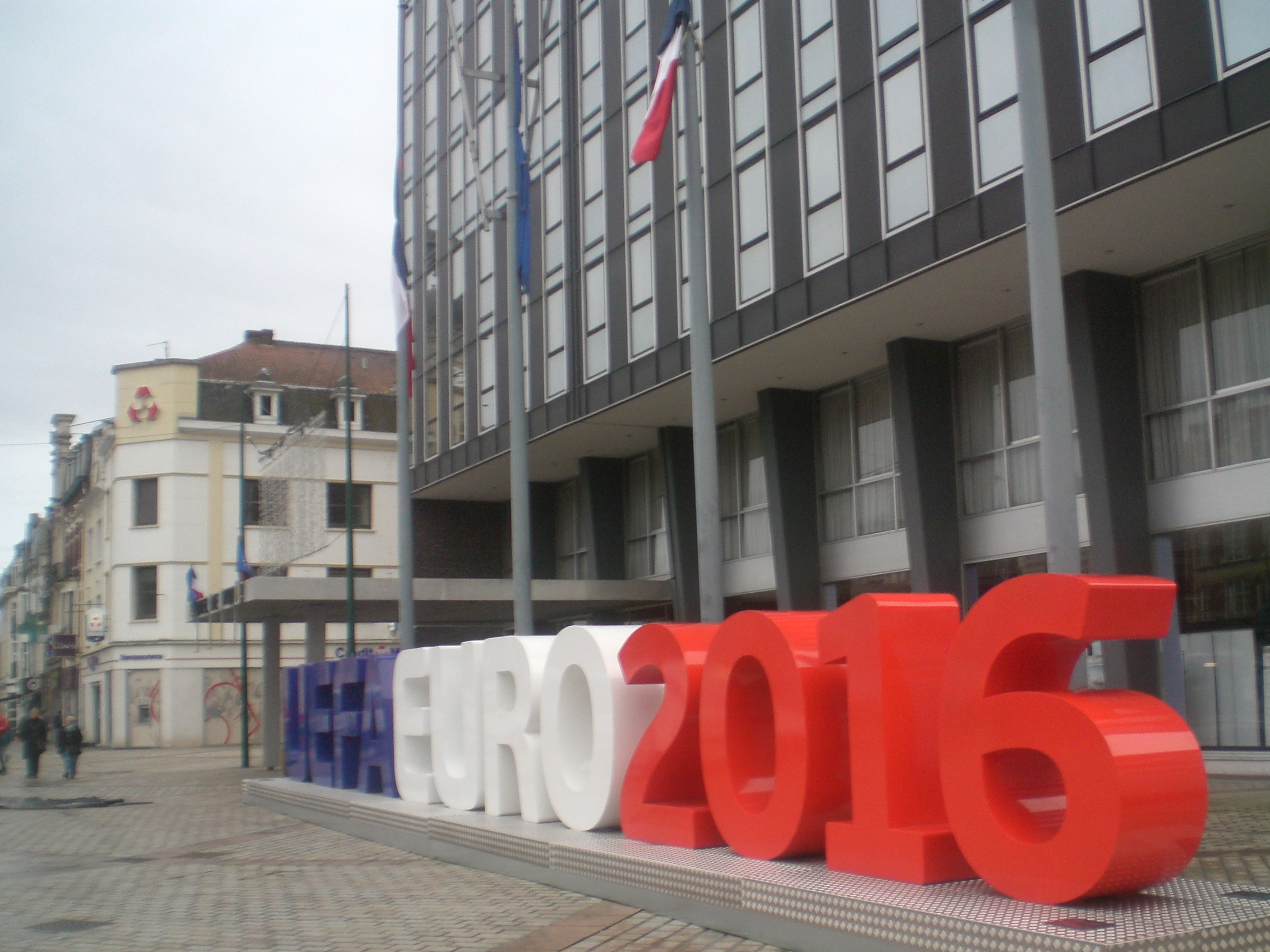
The Hôtel de Ville

== See also ==
- Stade Bollaert-Delelis
- Communes of the Pas-de-Calais department
- Category:Counts of Lens
- Institut de génie informatique et industriel
