= Canton of Sains-en-Gohelle =

Coordinates: 50°25′35″N 2°40′05″E

Sains-en-Gohelle
- Former canton
- Interactive map of Sains-en-Gohelle
- Country: France
- Region: Hauts-de-France
- Department: Pas-de-Calais
- No. of communes: {{{nbcomm}}}
- Disbanded: 2015
- Area: 46.94 km^{2} (18.12 sq mi)
- Population (2012): 20,272
  - Density: 431.9/km^{2} (1,119/sq mi)

The canton of Sains-en-Gohelle is a former canton situated in the department of the Pas-de-Calais and in the Nord-Pas-de-Calais region of northern France. It was disbanded following the French canton reorganisation which came into effect in March 2015. It had a total of 20,272 inhabitants (2012).

== Geography ==
The canton is organised around Sains-en-Gohelle in the arrondissement of Lens. The altitude varies from 39 m (Sains-en-Gohelle) to 192 m (Bouvigny-Boyeffles) for an average altitude of 102m.

The canton comprised 6 communes:

- Aix-Noulette
- Bouvigny-Boyeffles
- Gouy-Servins
- Hersin-Coupigny
- Sains-en-Gohelle
- Servins

== Population ==
Population Evolution
| 1962 | 1968 | 1975 | 1982 | 1990 | 1999 |
|---|---|---|---|---|---|
| 17730 | 18668 | 18786 | 18771 | 19782 | 20036 |
Census count starting from 1962 : Population without double counting

== See also ==
- Cantons of Pas-de-Calais
- Communes of Pas-de-Calais
- Arrondissements of the Pas-de-Calais department
