= Battle of Lorette Hill =

Battle in 1914–1915 on the Western Front during the First World War

- Part of The Western Front of the First World War
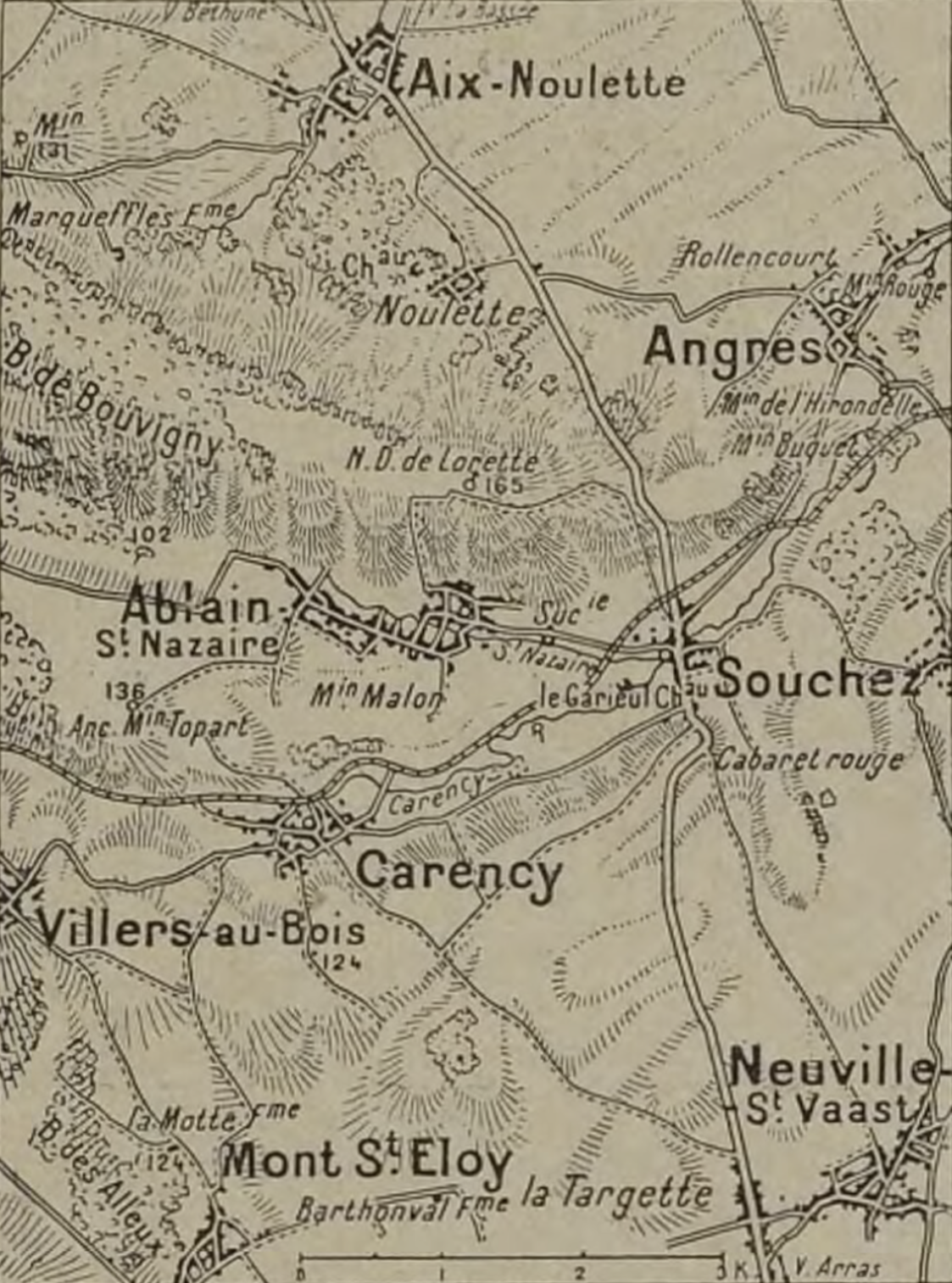
- Map of the battlefield of Lorette Hill (c. 1916)
Date	5 October 1914 – September 1915
Location	Notre Dame de Lorette, Pas-de-Calais, France 50°24′4″N 2°43′8″E
Result	French victory

Belligerents
France	German Empire

Commanders and leaders
Paul Maistre; Victor d'Urbal	Crown Prince Rupprecht of Bavaria
- Notre Dame de Lorette, Pas-de-Calais, France.

The Battle of Lorette Hill was a series of military engagements between the armies of Germany and France on the Western front of World War I, lasting from October 1915 to September 1915. The fighting took place neat the Notre Dame de Lorette chapel on the Coquaine Hill, Pas-de-Calais in north-western France. Strategically important uphill post was occupied by the Germans on 7 October 1914 during the battle of Arras, since then their positions were attacked by the French army during the First Battle of Artois and Second Battle of Artois finally retaking the whole site in the Third Battle of Artois in September 1915.

The battlefield later became a place of the biggest military necropolis of the French soldiers containing the remains of about 40,000 men.

== Background ==
Coquaine Hill is a 165 meters above sea level high hill near Ablain-Saint-Nazaire village, part of the Vimy Ridge in north-western France. On the top of the hill the Roman Catholic chapel was built in 1727, later reconstructed in a shape of a small church with the tower. In a flatty countryside this relatively low height of the hill offers an exceptional observation post over the locations of the Nord-Pas de Calais Mining Basin mining basin to the north and the Arras plain to the south.

== Battle ==
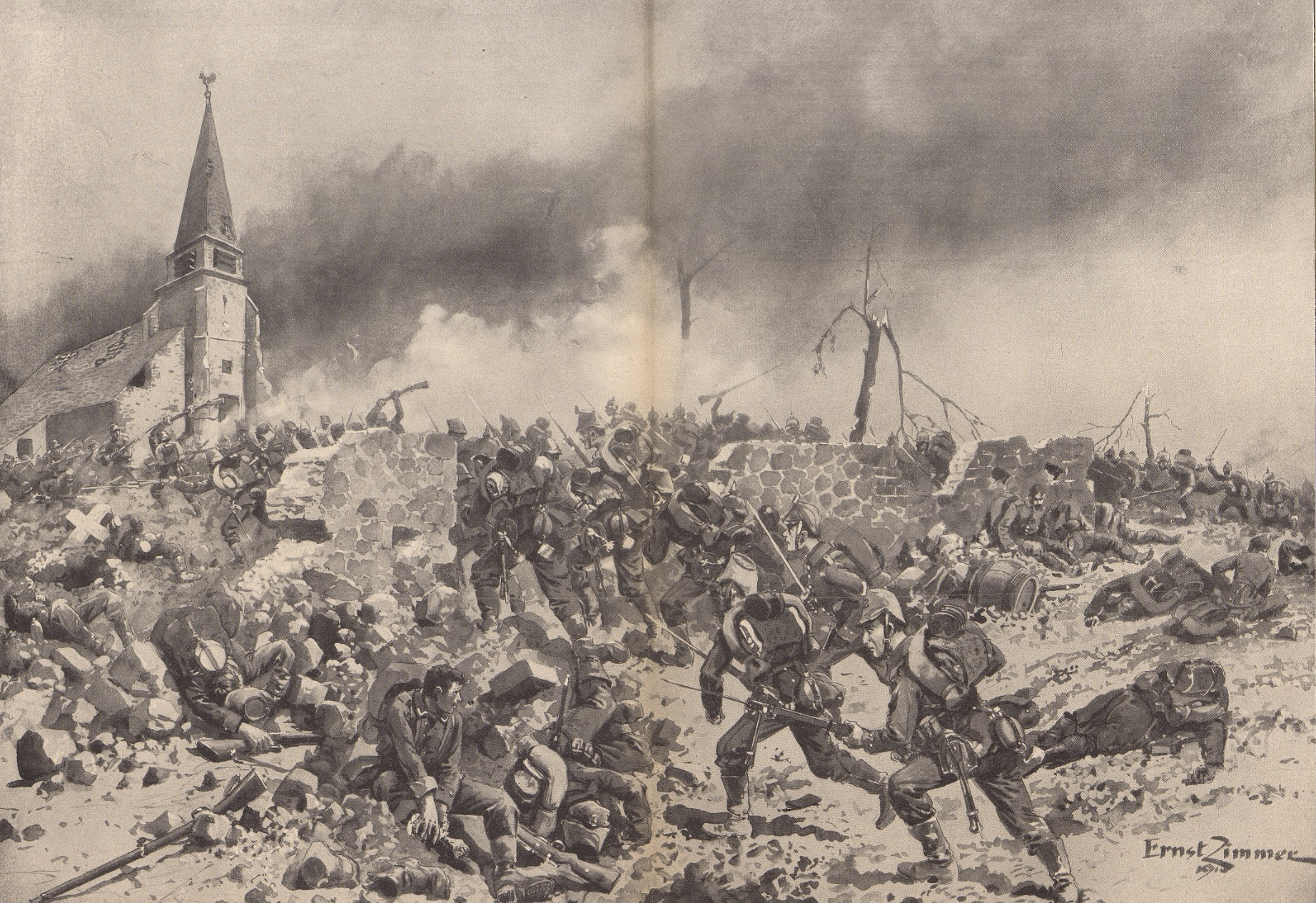
Fight on the Lorette Hill, 26 March 1915 (illustration by Ernst Zimmer, 1915)

German High Command recognized the strategic importance of the site and ordered to take it after the success in the battle of Arras in September 1914. Coquaine Hill fell into German hands on 5 October at 6 a.m. without any resistance. German troops then started to build trenches while being shelled from the French artillery fire. The first French attempt to retake the position came on 9 October by the 149th Infantry Regiment managing to take the chapel and surrounding area, while Germans were forced to retreat on the east side of the hill and in Ablain-Saint-Nazaire. Continuing German artillery fire and surprise German attack on 1 and 2 November pushed them back. Heavy fighting brought more attention of the French command for the site. Next French attack, proceeded by 21st Army Corps under General Paul Maistre, was planned on 17 December 1914, during the First Battle of Artois. 20th Bataillon de Chasseurs à Pied (light infantry) met with tough resistance and failed in their attempt with heavy losses.

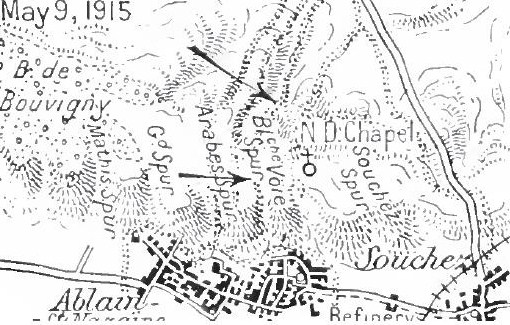
French attack on Notre Dame de Lorette, 9 May 1915

Until May 1915 French reached some partial successes securing positions south of the hill. On spring 1915 French and British command prepared a huge offensive with one of the mayor tasks to take the Lorette Spur with the Lorette Hill as a keypoint. During the intense fighting from 9 to 12 May 1915 soldiers the 70th, part of the 77th and the 13th divisions, including Moroccan units, were able to cross heavily fortified terrain and take the trenches on the higher ground around the chapel, already almost destroyed by the French artillery barrage. Direct attack against German positions and hand-to-hand combat led to heavy losses. For the next ten days smaller skirmishes occurred as the French were securing their positions on the top of the hill, while German lines still stayed just a few hundred meters on the east side of the hill keeping the French positions under artillery bombardment.

Final securing of the area came after the advance of the French Tenth Army troops starting on 25 September 1915, as the beginning of the third battle of Artois. After the attack French took the village of Souchez and secured the whole area around Coquaine Hill, although the front was moved just for a few kilometers. Some sources claims than fighting for the Lorette Hill continued until October 1915.

== Aftermath ==
The fighting around Lorette Hill and Colline de la Coquaine, together with the extensive German trench system, was among the fiercest of the three Battles of Artois. The battles resulted in tens of thousands of casualties, particularly among the French forces, for relatively small territorial gains. Lorette Hill subsequently became known as the “Bloody Hill” (Colline sanglante), a name reflecting the heavy casualties sustained during the fighting. The battles in Artois were later overshadowed in popular memory by the even greater losses of the Battle of Verdun. Its legend was later succeeded by the even bigger tragedy of the battle of Verdun.

== Memory ==
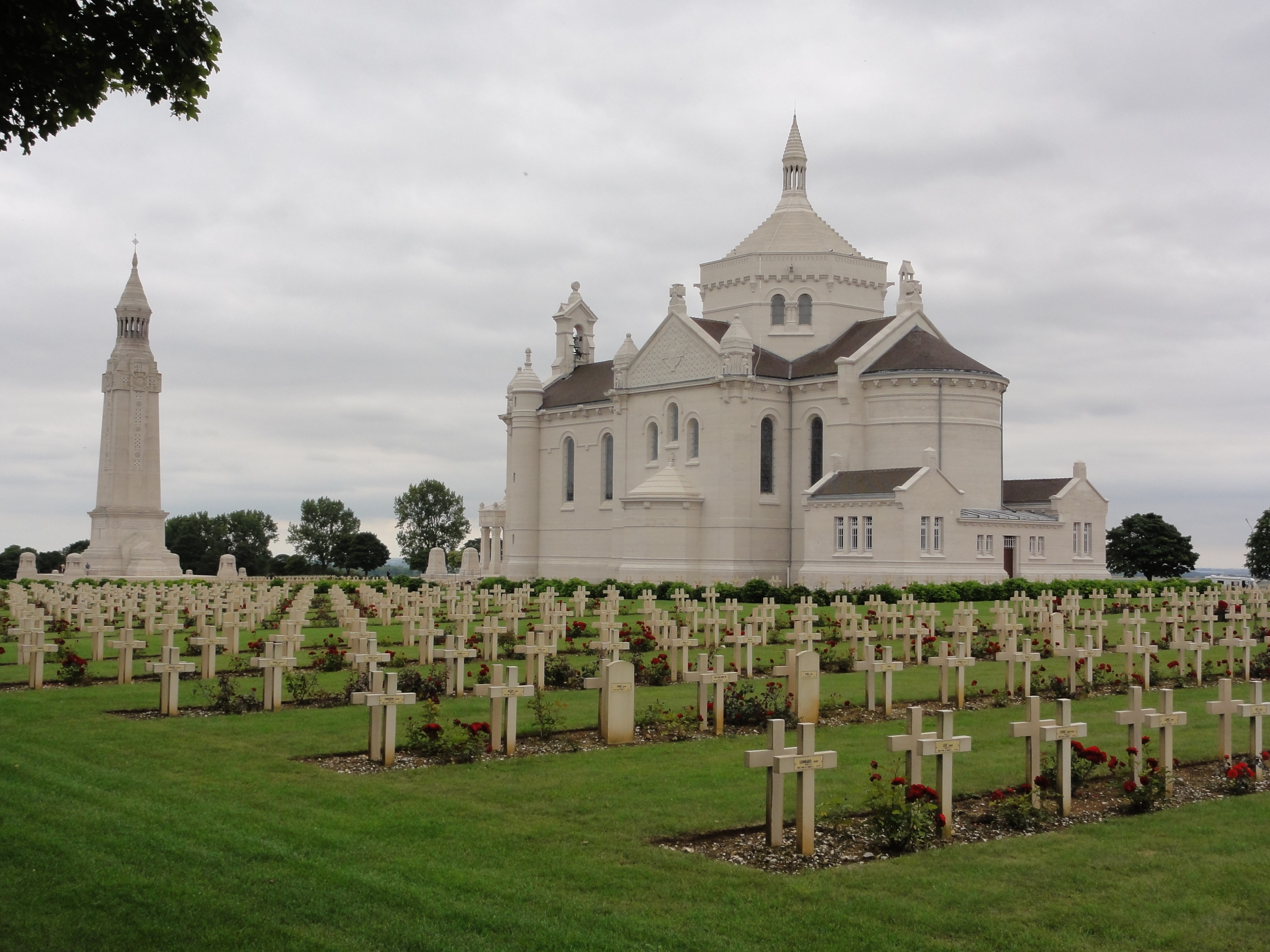
Notre-Dame de Lorette chapel surrounded by the military cemetery

After the war a national necropolis site the graves of French and Colonial fallen was placed here as well as an ossuary, containing the bones of those whose names were not marked. As the replacement of former chapel a new Neo-Byzantine basilica was built between 1921 and 1927 by the architect Louis-Marie Cordonnier and his son Jacques. In total, the cemetery and ossuary hold the remains of more than 40,000 soldiers. With the area of more than 25 hectares it is the largest French military necropolis.

In 1921 a 2,487-metre (8,159-foot) summit in Kananaskis Country in the Canadian Rockies of Alberta, Canada was named Mount Lorette, as a commemoration act of the fallen in clashes in the Lorette Spur.

== See also ==
- Notre Dame de Lorette
- First Battle of Artois
- Second Battle of Artois
- Third Battle of Artois

== Bibliography ==
- Goya, M. (2018) [2004]. Flesh and Steel During the Great War: The Transformation of the French Army and the Invention of Modern Warfare [La chair et l'acier: l'armée française et l'invention de la guerre moderne (1914–1918)]. Translated by Uffindell, A. (Eng. trans. ed.). Barnsley: pen & Sword Military. ISBN 978-1-47388-696-4.
