= Notre Dame de Lorette =

Cemetery in Pas-de-Calais, France

Notre Dame de Lorette (Ablain St.-Nazaire French Military Cemetery)
- France
- The Lantern of the Dead and the Basilica
- For Bitter and bloody battles in Ablain-Saint-Nazaire area.
- Location: 50°24′4″N 2°43′8″E
- Designed by: Louis-Marie Cordonnier, Jacques Cordonnier

UNESCO World Heritage Site
- Official name: Funerary and memory sites of the First World War (Western Front)
- Type: Cultural
- Criteria: i, ii, vi
- Designated: 2023 (45th session)
- Reference no.: 1567-PC10

Notre Dame de Lorette (French pronunciation: [nɔtʁ(ə) dam də lɔʁɛt]), also known as Ablain St.-Nazaire French Military Cemetery, is the world's largest French military cemetery. It is the name of a ridge, basilica, and French national cemetery northwest of Arras at the village of Ablain-Saint-Nazaire. The high point of the hump-backed ridge stands 165 metres high and – with Vimy Ridge – utterly dominates the otherwise flat Douai plain and the town of Arras.

== Site of four battles ==
The ground was strategically important during the First World War and was bitterly contested in a series of long and bloody engagements between the opposing French and German armies. It was the focal point of three battles:

- Battle of Arras (1914) (1–4 October 1914) – an encounter battle during the Race to the Sea
- First Battle of Artois (17 December 1914 –13 January 1915) – part of a combined attack with the First Battle of Champagne (20 December 1914 – 17 March 1915)
- Second Battle of Artois (9–15 May 1915) – French attack towards Vimy Ridge
- Third Battle of Artois (25 September–15 October 1915) – also known as the Artois–Loos Offensive

The Battles of Artois were as costly in French lives as the better-known Battle of Verdun. As with numerous other sites across France, Notre Dame de Lorette became a national necropolis, sacred ground containing the graves of French and Colonial fallen as well as an ossuary, containing the bones of those whose names were not marked.

== Cemetery and ossuary ==
Part of the French National Necropolis.

In total, the cemetery and ossuary hold the remains of more than 40,000 soldiers, as well as the ashes of many concentration camp victims.

The basilica and memorial buildings were designed by the architect Louis-Marie Cordonnier and his son Jacques Cordonnier, and built between 1921 and 1927.

== Basilica ==
A small building was raised in 1727 by the painter Nicolas Florent Guilbert, who had made a successful pilgrimage to Loreto (Italy), to shelter a statue of the Virgin Mary. It was destroyed in 1794, rebuilt in 1816 and transformed in 1880.

== Lantern Tower ==
The freestanding lantern tower, also by Cordonnier, stands 52m high and echoes the Pharos of Alexandria in both design and function, holding an eternal flame in its upper lantern. The structure is of reinforced concrete faced with reconstructed stone with a limestone appearance. The ground floor holds the visible coffins of 32 unknown soldiers from the various corners of the French domestic and colonial world. A small museum is accessible on the first floor. The height and hilltop location renders the tower visible over a radius of 70km.

== Gallery ==
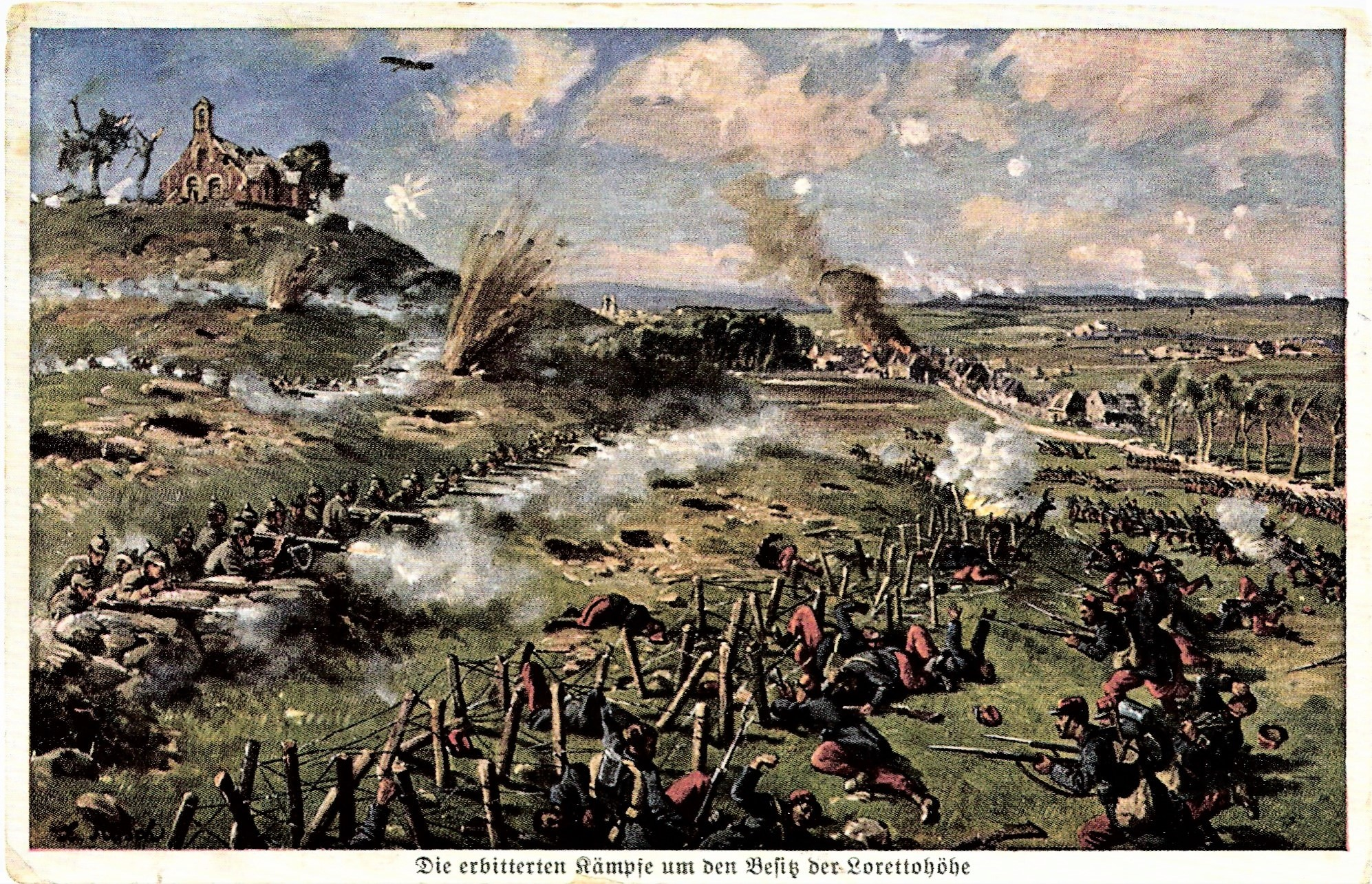
Second Battle of Artois, 1915

Basilica

Choir of the Basilica

Lantern Tower

Lorette Cemetery
