= Souchez =

- Commune
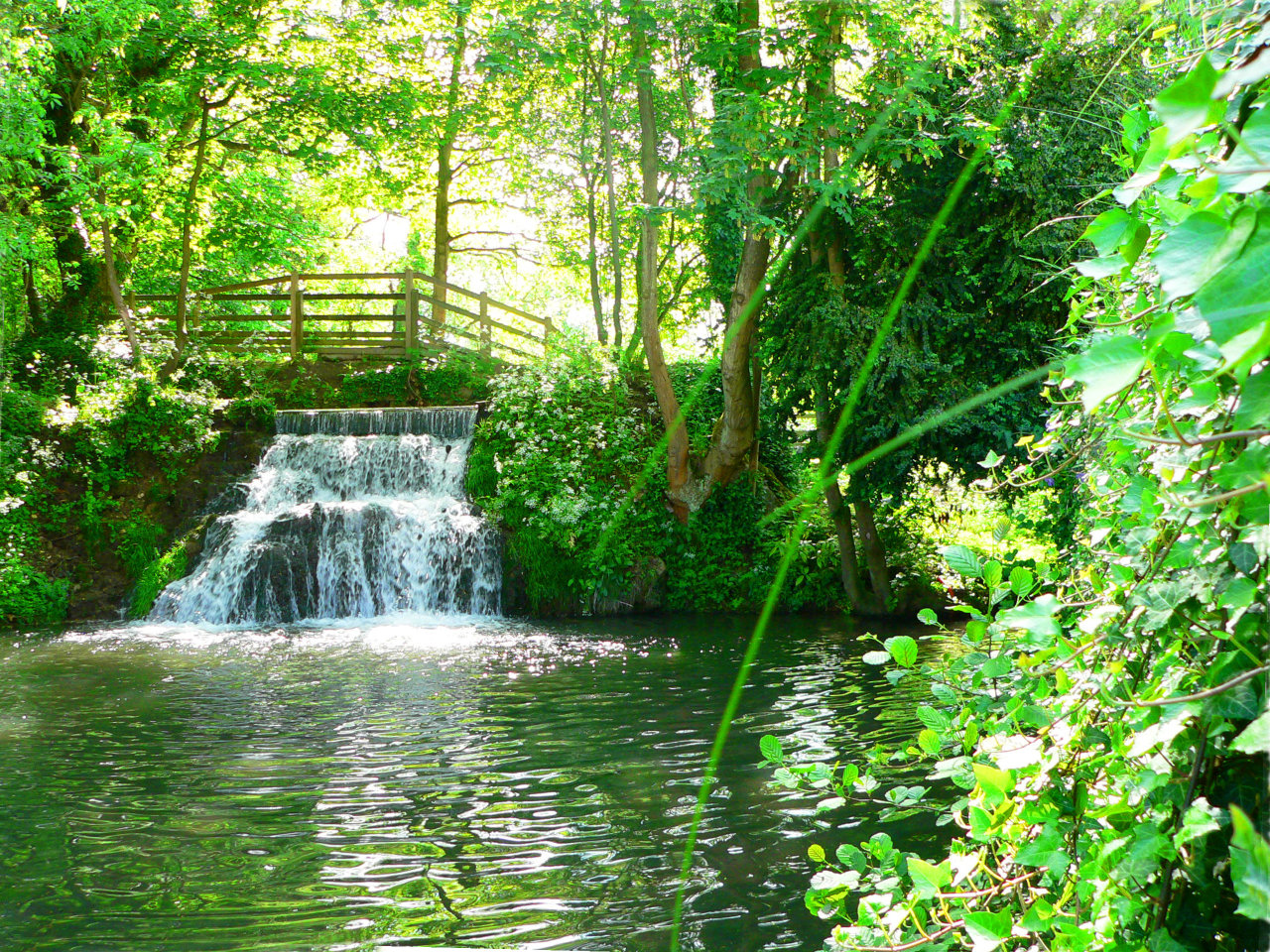
- The Souchez river

- Coat of arms
- Location of Souchez
- Location within France Location within Hauts-de-France
- Coordinates: 50°23′29″N 2°44′37″E
- Country: France
- Region: Hauts-de-France
- Department: Pas-de-Calais
- Arrondissement: Lens
- Canton: Bully-les-Mines
- Intercommunality: CA Lens-Liévin

Government
  - Mayor (2020–2026): Jean-Marie Alexandre
- Area^{1}: 6.75 km^{2} (2.61 sq mi)
- Elevation: 97 m (318 ft)
- Highest elevation: 157 m (515 ft)
- Lowest elevation: 62 m (203 ft)
- Population (2023): 2,663
  - Density: 395/km^{2} (1,020/sq mi)
- Time zone: UTC+01:00 (CET)
  - Summer (DST): UTC+02:00 (CEST)
- INSEE/Postal code: 62801 /62153
- ^{1} French Land Register data, which excludes lakes, ponds, glaciers > 1 km^{2} (0.386 sq mi or 247 acres) and river estuaries.

Souchez (French pronunciation: [suʃe]) is a commune in the Pas-de-Calais department in the Hauts-de-France region of France. It is located 3.2 kilometres (2.0 mi) northwest of the Canadian National Vimy Memorial dedicated to the Battle of Vimy Ridge and the missing First World War Canadian soldiers with no known grave; the Memorial is also the site of two Canadian cemeteries.

== Geography ==
Souchez lies 8 miles (13 km) north of Arras, at the junction of the D937, D57 and D58 roads. The small river Souchez, a tributary of the Deûle, flows through the town.

== Population ==
Historical population
Year	Pop.	±% p.a.
1968	1,800	—
1975	1,862	+0.48%
1982	1,872	+0.08%
1990	2,031	+1.02%
1999	2,176	+0.77%
2007	2,330	+0.86%
2012	2,587	+2.11%
2017	2,496	−0.71%
2023	2,663	+1.09%
Source: INSEE

== Places of interest ==
- The Basilica de Notre-Dame-de-Lorette, built in 1932, by the architect Louis Cordonnier. It overlooks Souchez, but is in fact located on the territory of the neighboring commune Ablain-Saint-Nazaire.
- The church of St.Nicolas, rebuilt, as was most of the village, after World War I.
- The French and Commonwealth War Graves Commission cemeteries.
- The war memorials.
- The museum and the Centre Européen de la Paix, all about the First World War
- The nearby Canadian National Vimy Memorial

== See also ==
- Communes of the Pas-de-Calais department
