= Villers-au-Bois =

- Commune
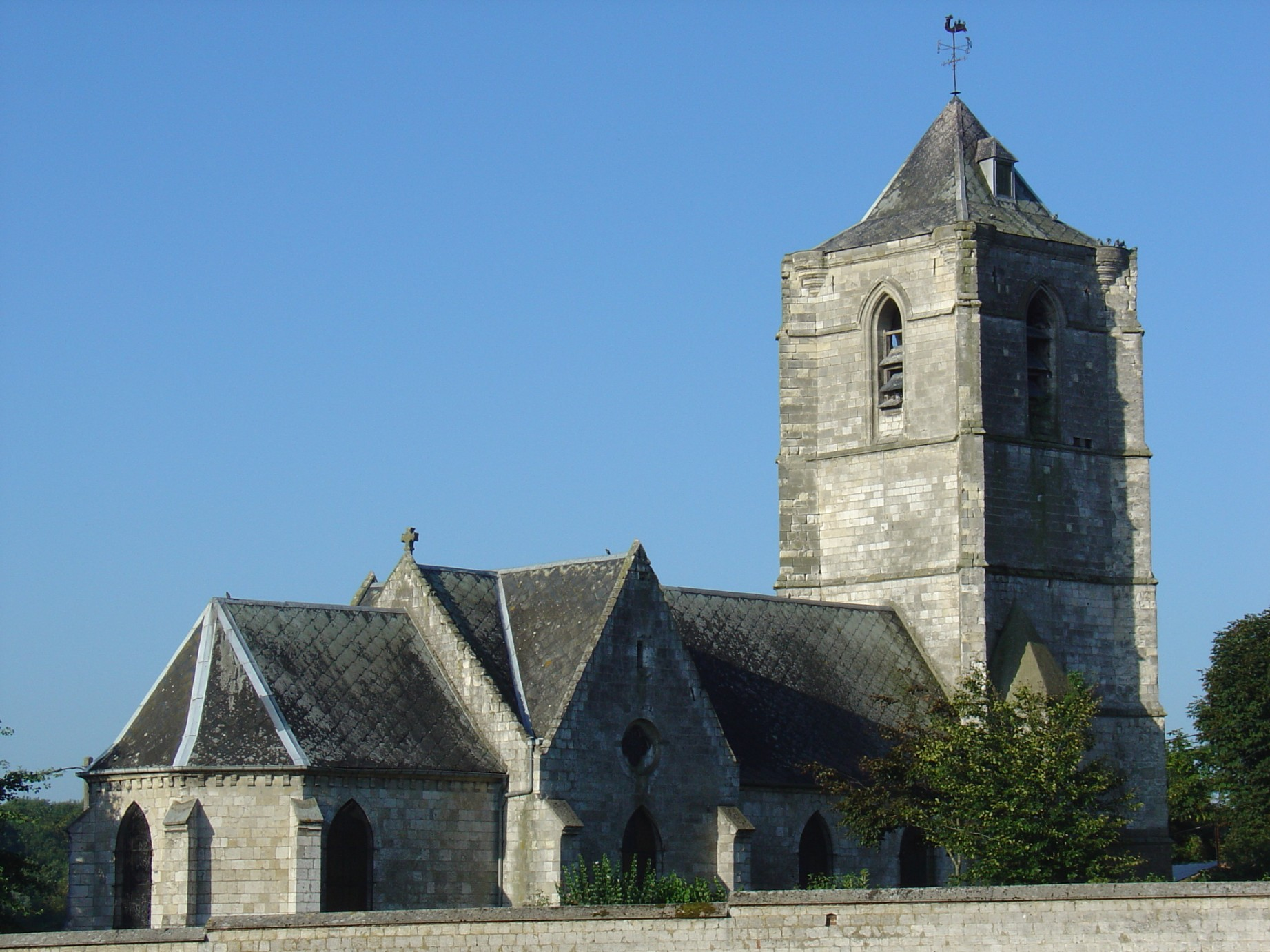
- The church of Villers-au-Bois
- Location of Villers-au-Bois
- Location within France Location within Hauts-de-France
- Coordinates: 50°22′26″N 2°40′20″E
- Country: France
- Region: Hauts-de-France
- Department: Pas-de-Calais
- Arrondissement: Lens
- Canton: Bully-les-Mines
- Intercommunality: CA Lens-Liévin

Government
  - Mayor (2020–2026): Bernadette Doutremepuich
- Area^{1}: 5.2 km^{2} (2.0 sq mi)
- Elevation: 146 m (479 ft)
- Highest elevation: 162 m (531 ft)
- Lowest elevation: 99 m (325 ft)
- Population (2023): 607
  - Density: 120/km^{2} (300/sq mi)
- Time zone: UTC+01:00 (CET)
  - Summer (DST): UTC+02:00 (CEST)
- INSEE/Postal code: 62854 /62144
- ^{1} French Land Register data, which excludes lakes, ponds, glaciers > 1 km^{2} (0.386 sq mi or 247 acres) and river estuaries.

Villers-au-Bois (French pronunciation: [vilɛʁ o bwa]) is a commune in the Pas-de-Calais department in the Hauts-de-France region of France about 8 miles (13 km) northwest of Arras.

== Population ==
Historical population
Year	Pop.	±% p.a.
1968	298	—
1975	311	+0.61%
1982	335	+1.07%
1990	369	+1.22%
1999	379	+0.30%
2007	437	+1.80%
2012	563	+5.20%
2017	568	+0.18%
2023	607	+1.11%
Source: INSEE

== See also ==
- Communes of the Pas-de-Calais department
