= Canton of Bully-les-Mines =

Coordinates: 50°27′27″N 2°43′06″E

Bully-les-Mines
- Canton
- Location of Bully-les-Mines within the department
- Country: France
- Region: Hauts-de-France
- Department: Pas-de-Calais
- No. of communes: {{{nbcomm}}}
- Area: 88.07 km^{2} (34.00 sq mi)
- Population (2023): 44,842
  - Density: 509.2/km^{2} (1,319/sq mi)
- INSEE code: 62 17

The canton of Bully-les-Mines is a canton situated in the department of the Pas-de-Calais and in the Hauts-de-France region of northern France. The canton is organised around Bully-les-Mines.

== Composition ==
At the French canton reorganisation which came into effect in March 2015, the canton was expanded from 2 to 12 communes:

- Ablain-Saint-Nazaire
- Aix-Noulette
- Angres
- Bouvigny-Boyeffles
- Bully-les-Mines
- Carency
- Gouy-Servins
- Mazingarbe
- Sains-en-Gohelle
- Servins
- Souchez
- Villers-au-Bois

== Population ==
Historical population
Year	Pop.	±% p.a.
2013	44,305	—
2018	44,304	−0.00%
Source: INSEE

== See also ==
- Cantons of Pas-de-Calais
- Communes of Pas-de-Calais
- Arrondissements of the Pas-de-Calais department
