= Mazingarbe =

- Commune
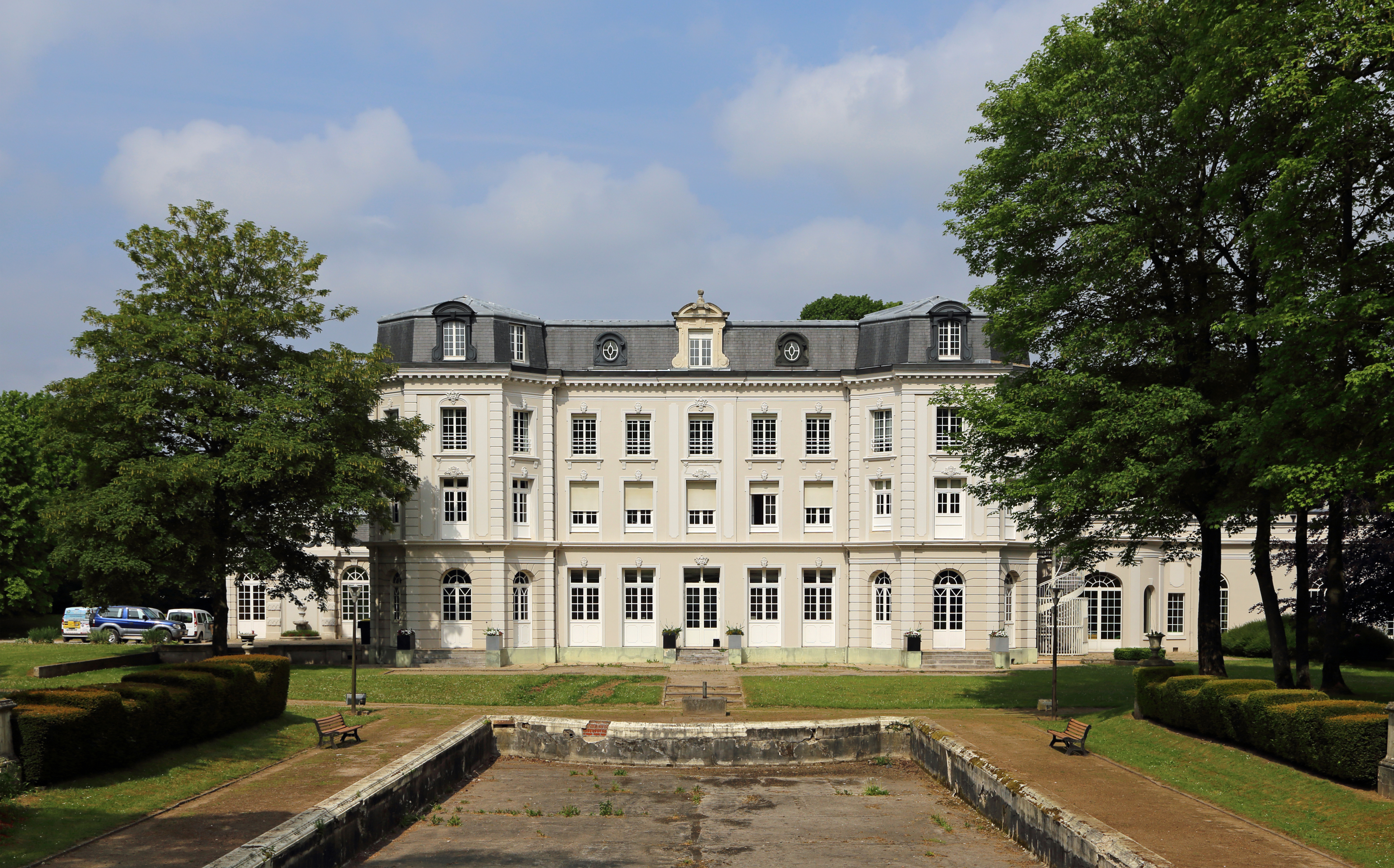
- The former Château Mercier, now town hall of Mazingarbe

- Coat of arms
- Location of Mazingarbe
- Location within France Location within Hauts-de-France
- Coordinates: 50°28′26″N 2°43′09″E
- Country: France
- Region: Hauts-de-France
- Department: Pas-de-Calais
- Arrondissement: Lens
- Canton: Bully-les-Mines
- Intercommunality: CA Lens-Liévin

Government
  - Mayor (2020–2026): Laurent Poissant
- Area^{1}: 10.27 km^{2} (3.97 sq mi)
- Elevation: 33 m (108 ft)
- Highest elevation: 74 m (243 ft)
- Lowest elevation: 26 m (85 ft)
- Population (2023): 8,217
  - Density: 800.1/km^{2} (2,072/sq mi)
- Time zone: UTC+01:00 (CET)
  - Summer (DST): UTC+02:00 (CEST)
- INSEE/Postal code: 62563 /62670
- ^{1} French Land Register data, which excludes lakes, ponds, glaciers > 1 km^{2} (0.386 sq mi or 247 acres) and river estuaries.

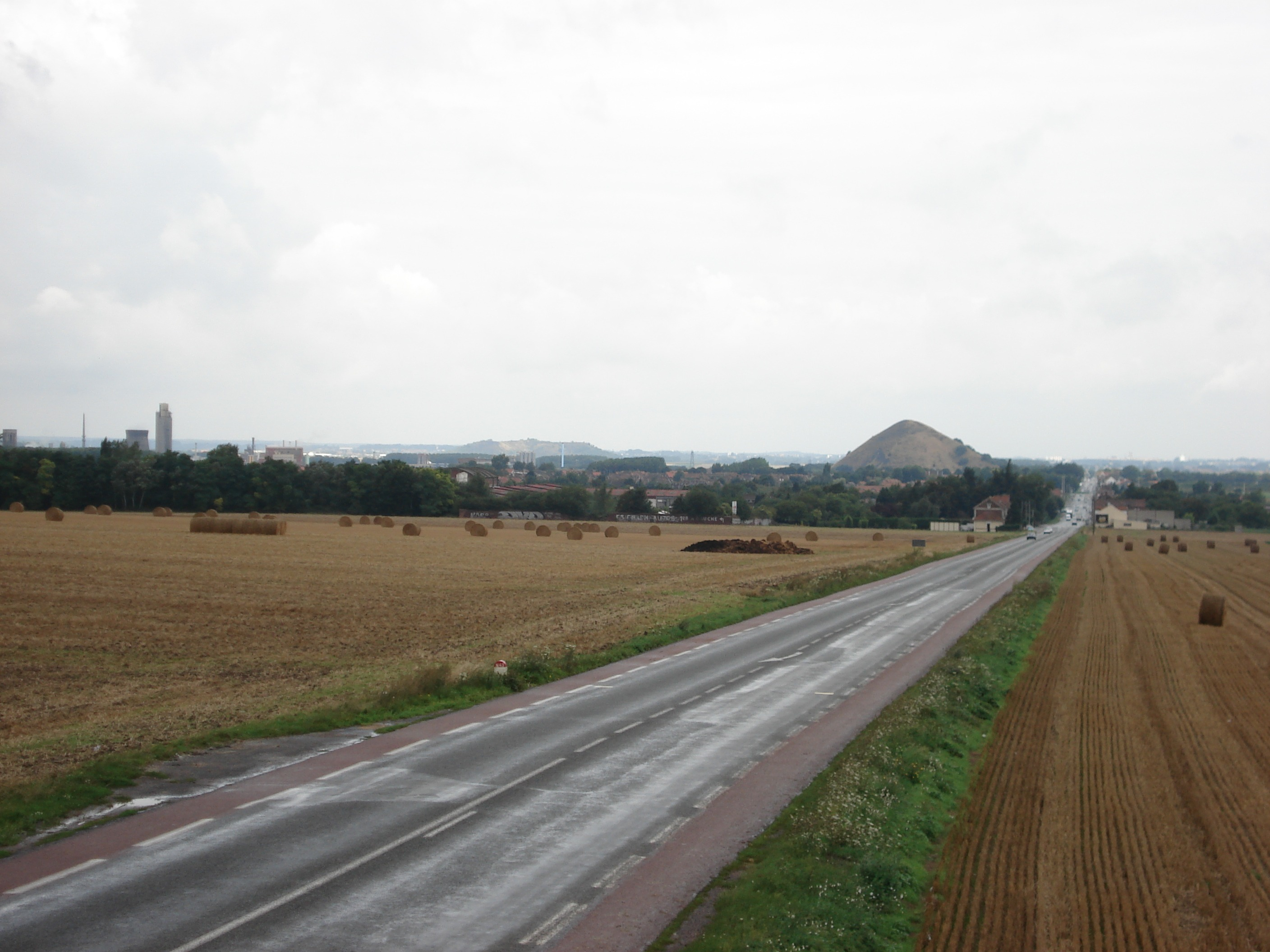
Road from Mazingarbe to Lens with a slag heap in the background

Mazingarbe (French pronunciation: [mazɛ̃ɡaʁb]; Picard: Mazingarpe) is a commune in the Pas-de-Calais department in the Hauts-de-France region of France 3 miles (4.8 km) northwest of Lens.

== Population ==
Historical population
Year	Pop.	±% p.a.
1968	10,074	—
1975	9,006	−1.59%
1982	8,128	−1.45%
1990	7,843	−0.45%
1999	7,482	−0.52%
2007	7,505	+0.04%
2012	7,620	+0.30%
2017	8,053	+1.11%
2023	8,217	+0.34%
Source: INSEE

== See also ==
- Communes of the Pas-de-Calais department
