= Guy Dangain =

French classical clarinetist

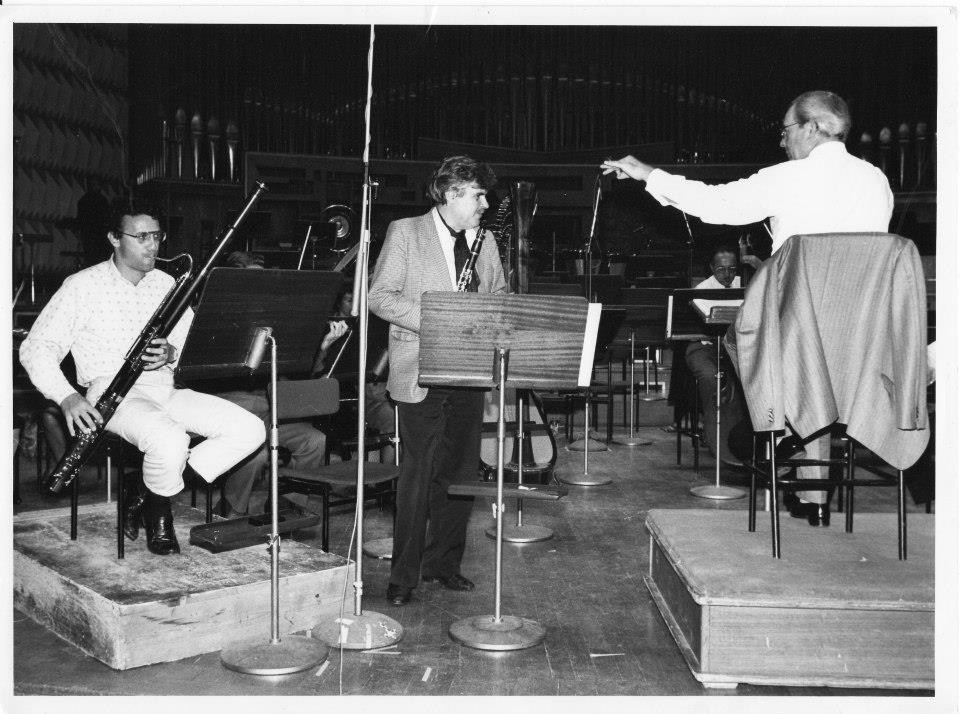
l.t.r. Régis Poulain, Guy Dangain, and Wolfgang Sawallisch at Radio France (1987)

Guy Dangain (born 12 July 1935) is a French classical clarinetist.

== Life ==
Born in Sains-en-Gohelle (Pas-de-Calais), Dangain, originally from the Pas-de-Calais mining area, began his musical studies in the orchestra of the mining town of Sains-en-Gohelle. From 1951 to 1952, he studied at the Conservatoire de Lille with Edmond Hannart. He then studied with Ulysse Delécluse at the Conservatoire de Paris, where he obtained a first prize in 1953.

As clarinet soloist with the Orchestre national de France 1963 to 1993, he performed under the direction of Lorin Maazel, Neville Marriner, Wolfgang Sawallisch, Leonard Bernstein, Jean Martinon, Karl Munchinger, Emmanuel Krivine, Marc Soustrot, Karel Husa and Manuel Rosenthal.

He won the Grand Prix du Disque (académie Charles-Cros) for his interpretation of Claude Debussy's Rhapsody, with the Orchestre national de France conducted by Jean Martinon.

In chamber music, he played with Isaac Stern, Wolfgang Sawallisch, Régis Pasquier, Patrice Fontanarosa, Michel Dalberto, Roland Pidoux.

From 1975 to 2000, as professeur de déchiffrage of the Conservatoire de Paris, Dangain gave master classes around the world, including the Tchaikovski Conservatory in Moscow, the United States (Los Angeles, Boston, Minneapolis, Cincinnati), China (Beijing, Shanghai, Canton, Hong Kong), Taiwan, Korea and Turkey.

He first taught clarinet from 1972 to 1975, and has taught at the École normale de musique de Paris since 2000.

He is the musical director of a collection of scores and educational works published by Billaudot, and is a tester and designer for the wind instrument manufacturer Selmer. Strongly attached to the amateur musical world, he served several years as president of the artistic council of the Confédération musicale de France.

In 1992, he helped found the Haut-Bugey Music Festival.

He is an officer of the Ordre des Arts et des Lettres and a chevalier of the Ordre des Palmes académiques.

== Premieres ==
- Scores published in his collection at éditions Billaudot (unless otherwise specified by the publisher), and which are dedicated to him.

=== For clarinet only ===
- Jean-Michel Damase: Hommage à Klosé : Chaconne. cop.1987
- Pierre-Max Dubois: 10 études transcendantes (1976). First audition by Dangain in Tokyo (Japan).
- Pierre-Max Dubois: Sonate brève. Premiere by Dangain in Helsinki - éd. Leduc
- Sung Ki Kim: Monologue for Guy - cop. 1992
- Marcel Mihalovici: Récit (9 February 1973) - cop. 1974 - First audition on September 6, 1973 by Dangain, his dedicatee
- Jean Rivier: Les trois S : Sillages, Soliloque, Serpentins (dedicated to J. Lancelot, G. Dangain, G. Deplus)- éd. Transatlantiques, cop. 1974
- Lucie Robert: Dialogues avec soi-même - cop. 1981
- Louis Saguer: Quatre essais, éd. Jobert, cop. 1973
- Antoine Tisné: Invocations pour Ellora (1969). Premiere 4 December 1972 by Dangain at Radio France

=== Other works ===
- Alain Bancquart: Écorces II (1966), for violin, clarinet, horn, piano, premiered by Michèle Boussinot, Dangain, André Fournier, Fabienne fournier at Radio France in 1966. éd. Jobert
- Alain Bancquart: Possibles (1968), for violon, clarinet and piano, créé by Michèle Boussinot, Guy Dangain, Fabienne Fournier à la Société Nationale in 1968. éd. Jobert (private commission)
- Jean Bizet: Chant de la nuit, pour clarinette et cordes - Premiered 17 January 1974, ORTF Chamber Orchestra, conducting by André Girard.
- Pierre-Max Dubois: Coïncidence (clarinet and piano, concours du Conservatoire de Paris). Premiered in Paris by Dangain and A.M. Panhaleux. Leduc
- Pierre-Max Dubois: Mini-Môme: three pieces dedicated to Guy Dangain.
- Pierre-Max Dubois: Beaugency-Concerto - Orchestre de chambre de l'ORTF, conducted by Gérard Devos
- Georges Delerue: Elégia, cop.1977; Romance, cop.1981 (clarinet and piano)
- Désiré Dondeyne: Trio clarinette, violon et piano premiered by Michèle Boussinot, Dangain, Fabienne Fournier
- Ida Gotkovsky: Images de Norvège (clarinet and piano) - cop. 1980, 1997
- Eugene Kurtz: Logo I (clarinet and piano, 1978–79); Logo II (clarinet, piano, 4 percussions) Premiere in Boston with members of the National Orchestra - éd. Jobert
- Trygve Madsen: Sonate for Clarinet and Piano Op. 23. Premiered 26 August 1980, Oslo - éd. Musikk-Huset A/S, 1981
- Trygve Madsen: Concerto Op.40 - éd. Musikk-Huset A/S, 1986
- Jérôme Naulais: Parfums d'Orient - (clarinet and piano) - cop.2000
- Igor Stravinsky: Hommage à Kennedy, for baryton and 3 clarinets (cors de basset) - Bernard Demigny, baryton; Dangain; Roland Simoncini and Henri Cliquennois ?. 16 March 1967, Radio France.

== Publications ==
- À propos de la clarinette, Billaudot, 1991, 114 pages
- Prestige de la clarinette (in Japanese), ed. Kosei, Japan
- Debussy et la Rhapsodie pour clarinette, Clarinette magazine °10, 3rd Trimester 1986, p. 23-30; reproduit aussi dans le journal Fréquences Selmer, supplément au n°15, December 2003 (Read online)

== Bibliography ==
- Guy Dangain, chef d'orchestre, Journal de la C.M.F. n°469, April 1997, p. 13-14
- Le clarinettiste Guy Dangain, l'anche de raison, Éditions Robert Martin: Newslettre n °11, April 2011
- Christine Bergna, Jack Hurier, J. Spenlehauer, Guy Dangain : le Retour aux sources, Journal de la C.M.F. n°441, August 1992, p. 13-14
- Christine Bergna, Laurence Solnais, Guy Dangain : l'effort et la méthode, Journal de la C.M.F. n° 448, October 1993, p. 12-15
- Jean-Marie Paul, Guy Dangain: interview, Clarinette magazine, n°6, 3rd trimester 1985, p. 3-7
