= Servins =

- Commune
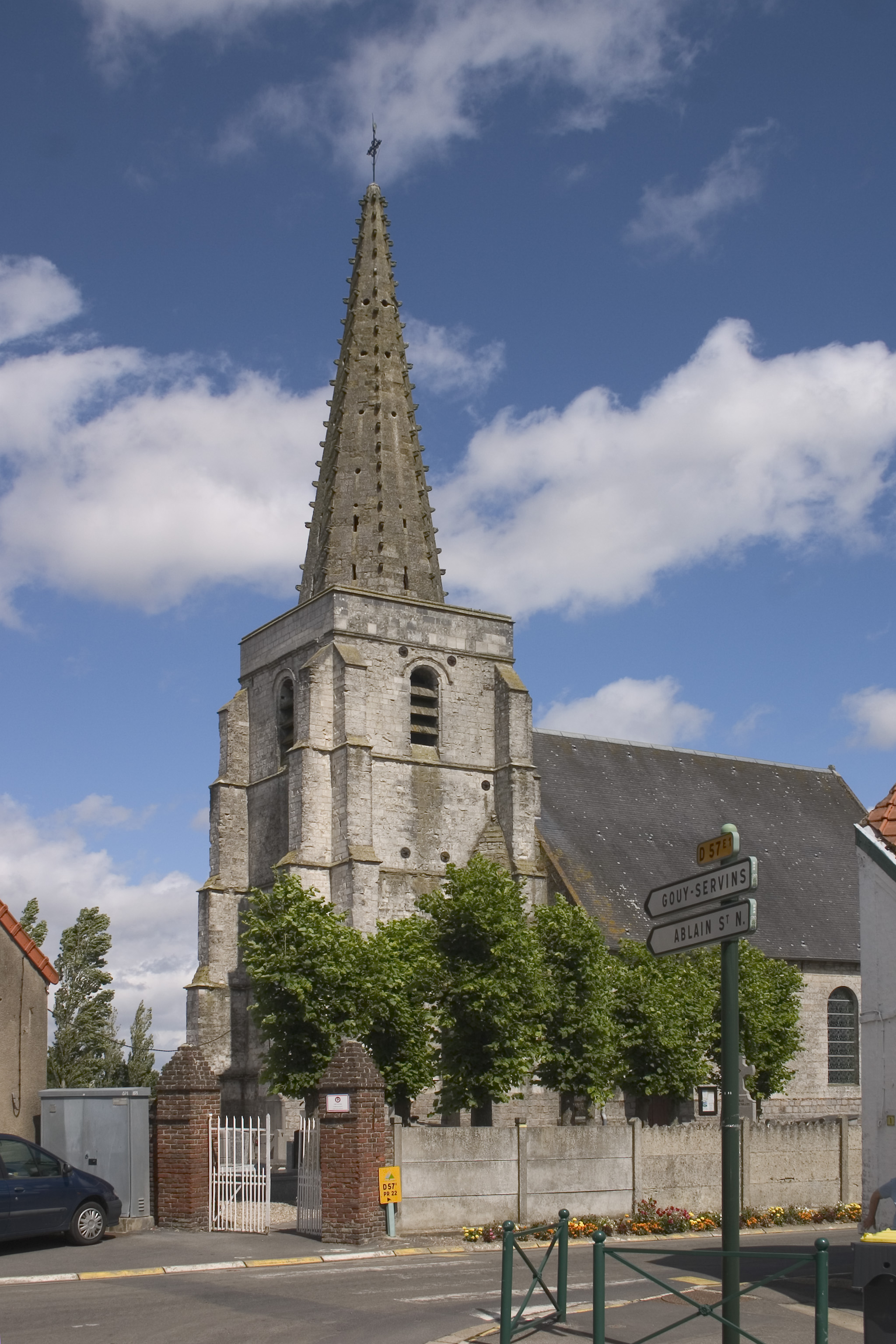
- The church of Servins

- Coat of arms
- Location of Servins
- Location within France Location within Hauts-de-France
- Coordinates: 50°24′33″N 2°38′19″E
- Country: France
- Region: Hauts-de-France
- Department: Pas-de-Calais
- Arrondissement: Lens
- Canton: Bully-les-Mines
- Intercommunality: CA Lens-Liévin

Government
  - Mayor (2020–2026): Nadine Ducloy
- Area^{1}: 6.36 km^{2} (2.46 sq mi)
- Elevation: 163 m (535 ft)
- Highest elevation: 183 m (600 ft)
- Lowest elevation: 135 m (443 ft)
- Population (2023): 1,147
  - Density: 180/km^{2} (467/sq mi)
- Time zone: UTC+01:00 (CET)
  - Summer (DST): UTC+02:00 (CEST)
- INSEE/Postal code: 62793 /62530
- ^{1} French Land Register data, which excludes lakes, ponds, glaciers > 1 km^{2} (0.386 sq mi or 247 acres) and river estuaries.

Servins (French pronunciation: [sɛʁvɛ̃]; Dutch: Sarwin) is a commune in the Pas-de-Calais department in the Hauts-de-France region of France. 11 miles (18 km) west of Lens.

== Population ==
Historical population
Year	Pop.	±% p.a.
1968	520	—
1975	473	−1.34%
1982	618	+3.89%
1990	803	+3.33%
1999	882	+1.05%
2007	1,037	+2.04%
2012	1,102	+1.22%
2017	1,093	−0.16%
2023	1,147	+0.81%
Source: INSEE

== See also ==
- Communes of the Pas-de-Calais department
