= Aix-Noulette =

- Commune
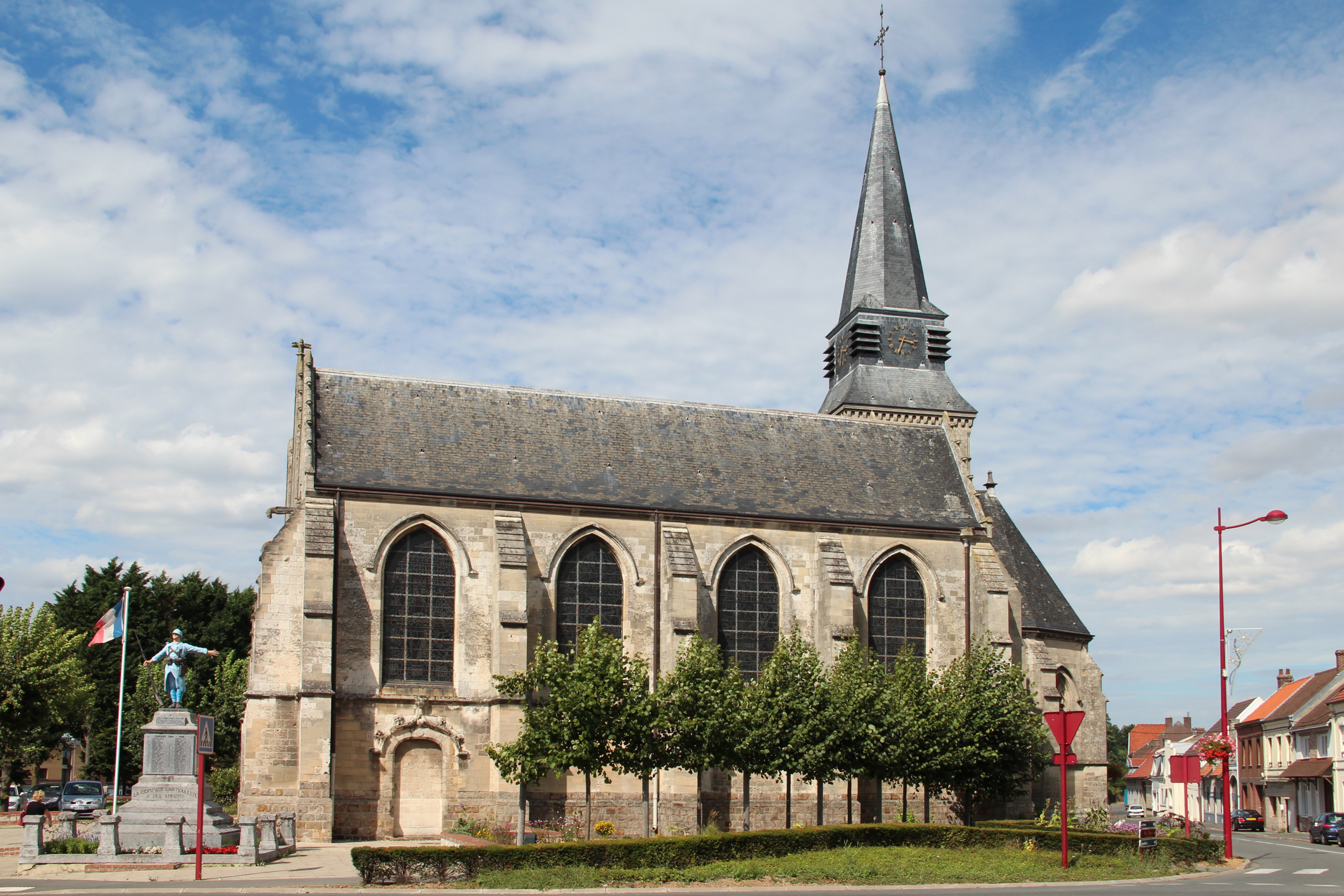
- The church of Aix-Noulette

- Coat of arms
- Location of Aix-Noulette
- Location within France Location within Hauts-de-France
- Coordinates: 50°25′36″N 2°42′38″E
- Country: France
- Region: Hauts-de-France
- Department: Pas-de-Calais
- Arrondissement: Lens
- Canton: Bully-les-Mines
- Intercommunality: Lens-Liévin

Government
  - Mayor (2024–2026): Alain Lefèbvre
- Area^{1}: 10.44 km^{2} (4.03 sq mi)
- Elevation: 75 m (246 ft)
- Highest elevation: 172 m (564 ft)
- Lowest elevation: 57 m (187 ft)
- Population (2023): 3,902
  - Density: 373.8/km^{2} (968.0/sq mi)
- Time zone: UTC+01:00 (CET)
  - Summer (DST): UTC+02:00 (CEST)
- INSEE/Postal code: 62019 /62160
- ^{1} French Land Register data, which excludes lakes, ponds, glaciers > 1 km^{2} (0.386 sq mi or 247 acres) and river estuaries.

Aix-Noulette (French pronunciation: [ɛks nulɛt]) is a commune in the Pas-de-Calais department in the Hauts-de-France region of France about 5 miles (8.0 km) west of Lens.

== Population ==
Historical population
Year	Pop.	±% p.a.
1968	2,660	—
1975	3,358	+3.38%
1982	3,093	−1.17%
1990	3,661	+2.13%
1999	3,836	+0.52%
2007	3,754	−0.27%
2012	3,877	+0.65%
2017	3,906	+0.15%
2023	3,902	−0.02%
Source: INSEE

== See also ==
- Communes of the Pas-de-Calais department
- The Église Saint-Germain d’Aix-Noulette has Georges Saupique statues of St Barbara and St Nicholas.
