= Bouvigny-Boyeffles =

- Commune
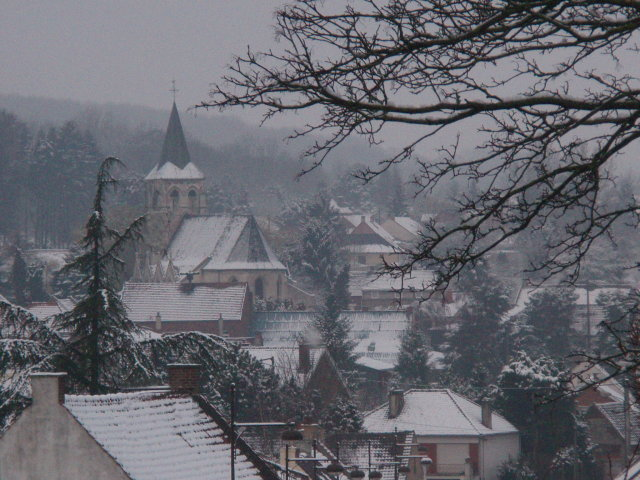
- The church of Bouvigny-Boyeffles

- Coat of arms
- Location of Bouvigny-Boyeffles
- Location within France Location within Hauts-de-France
- Coordinates: 50°25′20″N 2°40′23″E
- Country: France
- Region: Hauts-de-France
- Department: Pas-de-Calais
- Arrondissement: Lens
- Canton: Bully-les-Mines
- Intercommunality: CA Lens-Liévin

Government
  - Mayor (2020–2026): Maurice Viseux
- Area^{1}: 9.07 km^{2} (3.50 sq mi)
- Elevation: 116 m (381 ft)
- Highest elevation: 192 m (630 ft)
- Lowest elevation: 68 m (223 ft)
- Population (2023): 2,398
  - Density: 264/km^{2} (685/sq mi)
- Time zone: UTC+01:00 (CET)
  - Summer (DST): UTC+02:00 (CEST)
- INSEE/Postal code: 62170 /62172
- ^{1} French Land Register data, which excludes lakes, ponds, glaciers > 1 km^{2} (0.386 sq mi or 247 acres) and river estuaries.

Bouvigny-Boyeffles is a commune in the Pas-de-Calais department in the Hauts-de-France region in northern France.

== Geography ==
An ex-coalmining area, but now a farming village, situated just 8 miles (13 km) west of Lens at the junction of the D165 and D75 roads.

== Population ==
Historical population
Year	Pop.	±% p.a.
1968	1,927	—
1975	2,049	+0.88%
1982	2,216	+1.13%
1990	2,317	+0.56%
1999	2,439	+0.57%
2007	2,449	+0.05%
2012	2,447	−0.02%
2017	2,403	−0.36%
2023	2,398	−0.03%
Source: INSEE

== Sights ==
- The church of St. Marin, dating from the fifteenth century.
- The modern church of St. Martin.
- The eighteenth-century chateau of Boyeffles.
- The radio and TV transmitter.

== See also ==
- Communes of the Pas-de-Calais department
