= Gouy-Servins =

- Commune
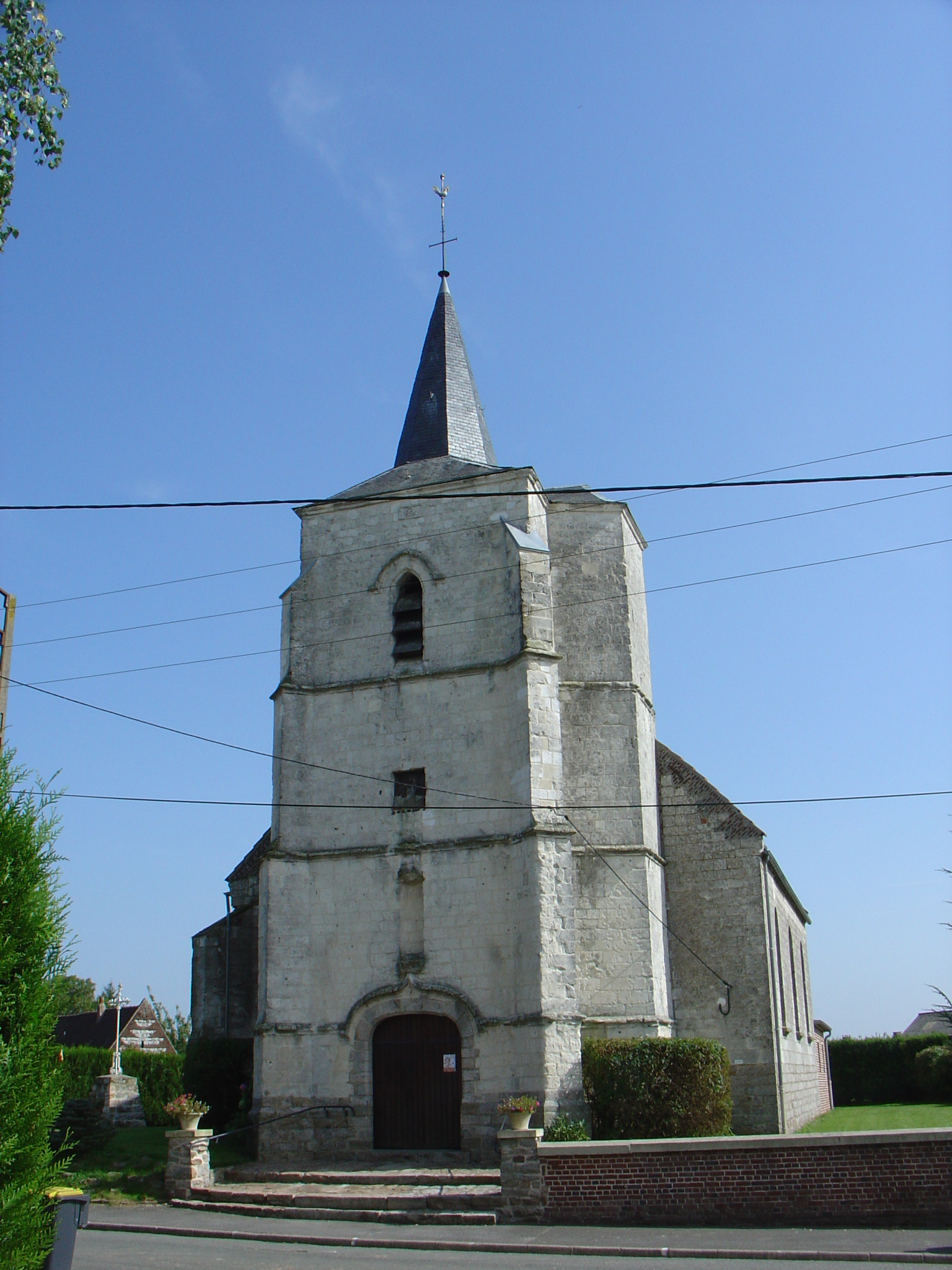
- The church of Gouy-Servins

- Coat of arms
- Location of Gouy-Servins
- Location within France Location within Hauts-de-France
- Coordinates: 50°24′14″N 2°39′02″E
- Country: France
- Region: Hauts-de-France
- Department: Pas-de-Calais
- Arrondissement: Lens
- Canton: Bully-les-Mines
- Intercommunality: CA Lens-Liévin

Government
  - Mayor (2020–2026): Alain Lherbier
- Area^{1}: 3.32 km^{2} (1.28 sq mi)
- Elevation: 160 m (520 ft)
- Highest elevation: 171 m (561 ft)
- Lowest elevation: 124 m (407 ft)
- Population (2023): 360
  - Density: 110/km^{2} (280/sq mi)
- Time zone: UTC+01:00 (CET)
  - Summer (DST): UTC+02:00 (CEST)
- INSEE/Postal code: 62380 /62530
- ^{1} French Land Register data, which excludes lakes, ponds, glaciers > 1 km^{2} (0.386 sq mi or 247 acres) and river estuaries.

Gouy-Servins is a commune in the Pas-de-Calais department in the Hauts-de-France region of France about 10 miles (16 km) west of Lens.

== Population ==
Historical population
Year	Pop.	±% p.a.
1968	239	—
1975	217	−1.37%
1982	242	+1.57%
1990	288	+2.20%
1999	297	+0.34%
2007	311	+0.58%
2012	337	+1.62%
2017	344	+0.41%
2023	360	+0.76%
Source: INSEE

== See also ==
- Communes of the Pas-de-Calais department
