= Sains-en-Gohelle =

Commune in the Hauts-de-France region, France

- Commune
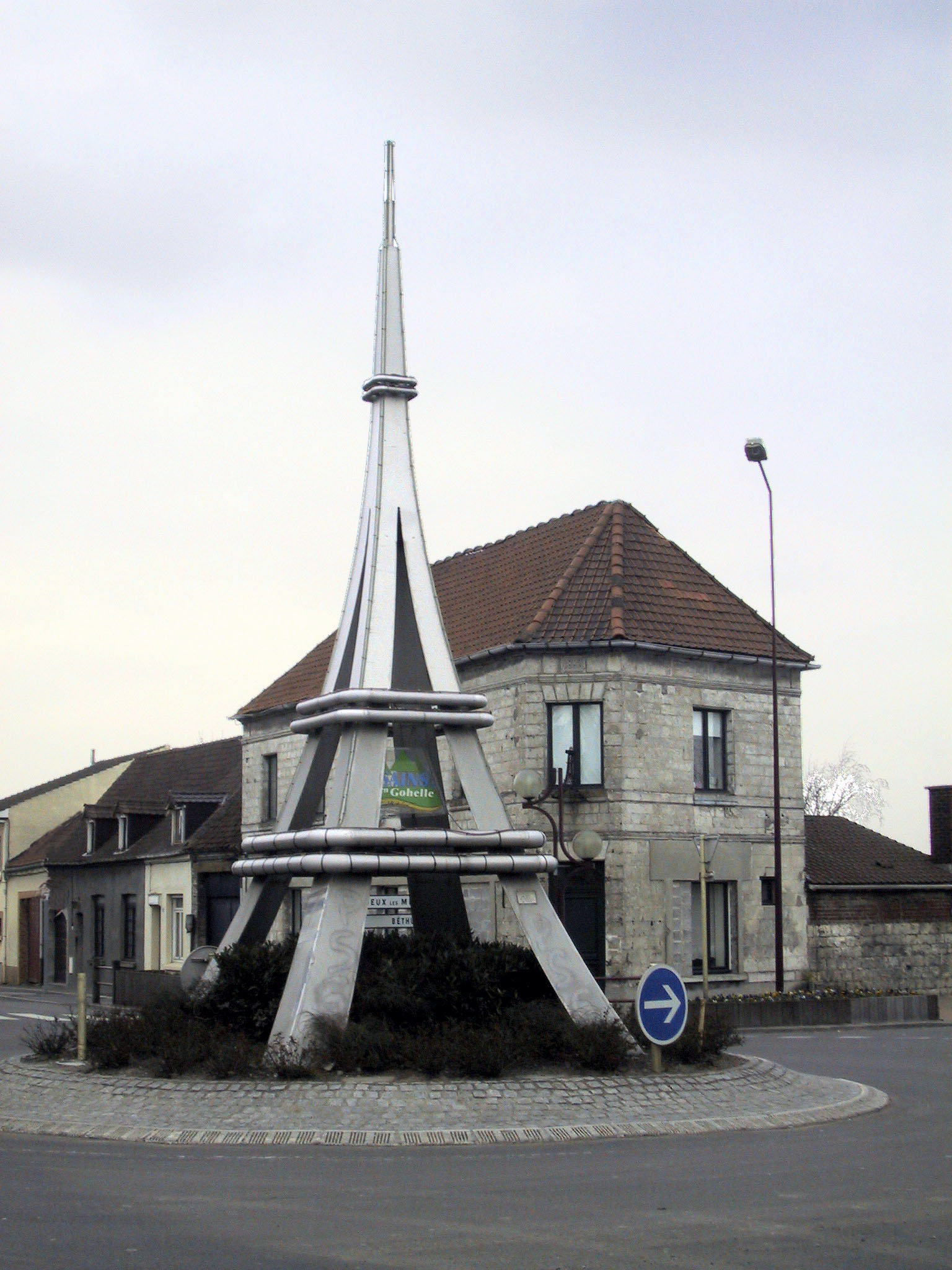
- Model of the Eiffel Tower at the crossroads

- Coat of arms
- Location of Sains-en-Gohelle
- Location within France Location within Hauts-de-France
- Coordinates: 50°26′43″N 2°41′04″E
- Country: France
- Region: Hauts-de-France
- Department: Pas-de-Calais
- Arrondissement: Lens
- Canton: Bully-les-Mines
- Intercommunality: CA Lens-Liévin

Government
  - Mayor (2020–2026): Alain Dubreucq
- Area^{1}: 5.73 km^{2} (2.21 sq mi)
- Elevation: 79 m (259 ft)
- Highest elevation: 90 m (300 ft)
- Lowest elevation: 39 m (128 ft)
- Population (2023): 5,948
  - Density: 1,040/km^{2} (2,690/sq mi)
- Time zone: UTC+01:00 (CET)
  - Summer (DST): UTC+02:00 (CEST)
- INSEE/Postal code: 62737 /62114
- ^{1} French Land Register data, which excludes lakes, ponds, glaciers > 1 km^{2} (0.386 sq mi or 247 acres) and river estuaries.

Sains-en-Gohelle is a commune in the Pas-de-Calais department in the Hauts-de-France region of France.

== Geography ==
Sains-en-Gohelle is an ex-coalmining town, nowadays a farming and light industrial commune, 6 miles (9.7 km) northwest of Lens, at the junction of the D937 and the D166 roads. The A26 autoroute passes through the town.

== Coal mining ==
Excavation of Mine 10 by the Compagnie des mines de Béthune started in July 1900 at Sains-en-Gohelle, and eventually reached 730 metres (2,400 ft). Shaft 10bis was started in July 1901 and reached 791 metres (2,595 ft). Production started in 1903. The mine closed in 1957 and was back-filled in 1972. Surface installations were destroyed in 1975.

== Population ==
Historical population
Year	Pop.	±% p.a.
1968	5,328	—
1975	5,175	−0.42%
1982	5,573	+1.06%
1990	6,020	+0.97%
1999	6,072	+0.10%
2007	6,044	−0.06%
2012	6,391	+1.12%
2017	6,145	−0.78%
2023	5,948	−0.54%
Source: INSEE

== Places of interest ==
- The church of St.Vaast, dating from the twelfth century.
- The modern church of Saint Marguerite.

== See also ==
- Communes of the Pas-de-Calais department
- Guy Dangain (born 12 July 1935), French classical flutist.
