= Ablain-Saint-Nazaire =

- Commune
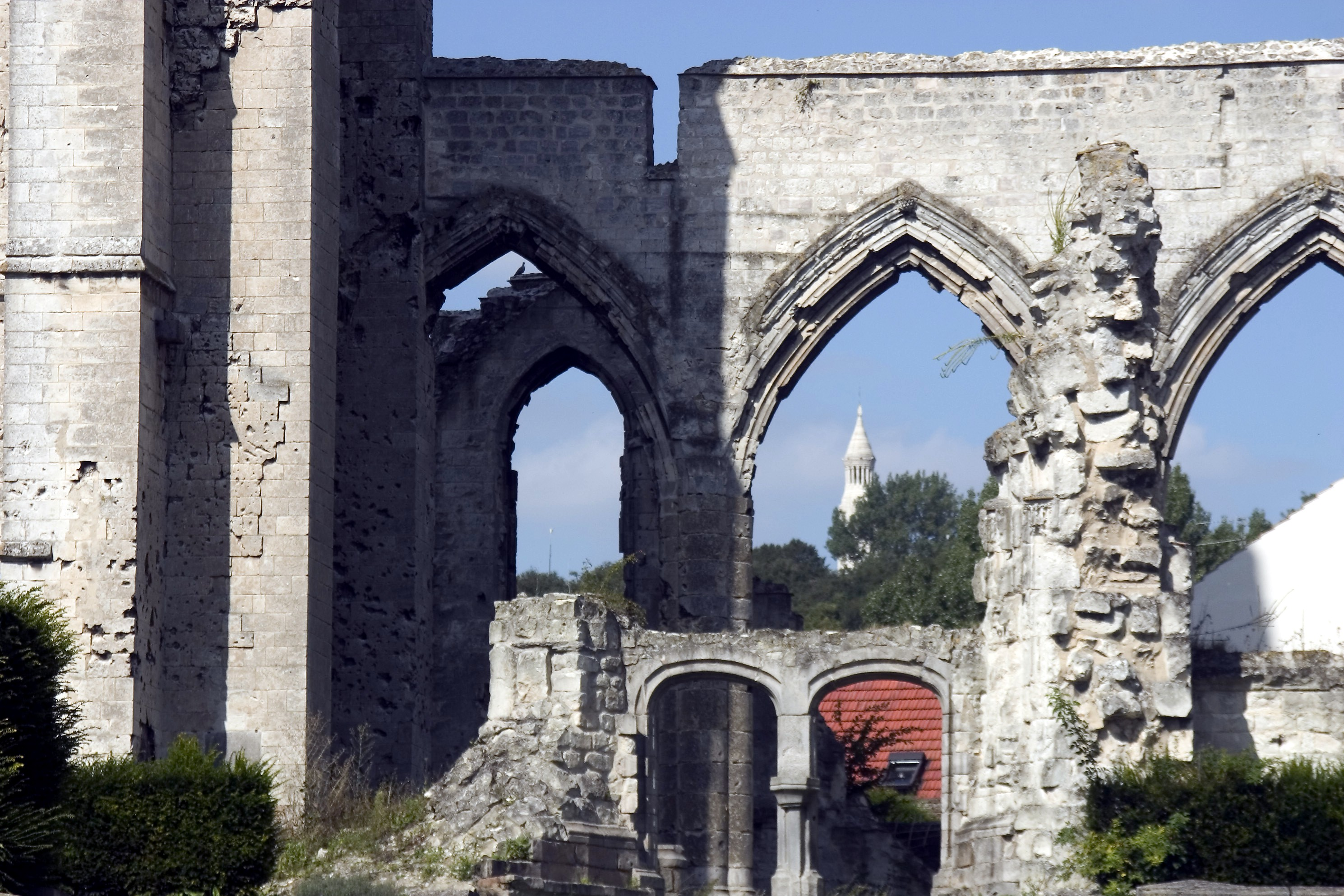
- Ruins of the church destroyed during World War I

- Coat of arms
- Location of Ablain-Saint-Nazaire
- Location within France Location within Hauts-de-France
- Coordinates: 50°23′34″N 2°42′48″E
- Country: France
- Region: Hauts-de-France
- Department: Pas-de-Calais
- Arrondissement: Lens
- Canton: Bully-les-Mines
- Intercommunality: Lens-Liévin

Government
  - Mayor (2022–2026): Philippe Vantorre
- Area^{1}: 9.85 km^{2} (3.80 sq mi)
- Elevation: 95 m (312 ft)
- Highest elevation: 188 m (617 ft)
- Lowest elevation: 77 m (253 ft)
- Population (2023): 1,994
  - Density: 202/km^{2} (524/sq mi)
- Demonym(s): Ablainois, Ablainoises
- Time zone: UTC+01:00 (CET)
  - Summer (DST): UTC+02:00 (CEST)
- INSEE/Postal code: 62001 /62153
- ^{1} French Land Register data, which excludes lakes, ponds, glaciers > 1 km^{2} (0.386 sq mi or 247 acres) and river estuaries.

Ablain-Saint-Nazaire (French pronunciation: [ablɛ̃ sɛ̃ nazɛːʁ]) is a commune in the Pas-de-Calais department in northern France.

== Geography ==
A farming village located 8 miles (12 km) north of Arras, on the D57 road. It was rebuilt after being destroyed during World War I. The Saint-Nazaire stream, which passes through the commune, is a small tributary of the river Deûle.

== Population ==
Historical population

Year	Pop.	±% p.a.
1793	787	—
1800	816	+0.52%
1806	893	+1.51%
1821	932	+0.29%
1831	880	−0.57%
1836	855	−0.57%
1841	902	+1.08%
1846	858	−1.00%
1851	865	+0.16%
1856	831	−0.80%
1861	826	−0.12%
1866	888	+1.46%
1872	864	−0.46%
1876	847	−0.50%
1881	883	+0.84%
1886	935	+1.15%
1891	942	+0.15%
1896	974	+0.67%
1901	1,077	+2.03%

Year	Pop.	±% p.a.
1906	1,155	+1.41%
1911	1,127	−0.49%
1921	814	−3.20%
1926	1,070	+5.62%
1931	1,098	+0.52%
1936	1,035	−1.17%
1946	1,116	+0.76%
1954	1,071	−0.51%
1962	1,295	+2.40%
1968	1,293	−0.03%
1975	1,388	+1.02%
1982	1,482	+0.94%
1990	1,715	+1.84%
1999	1,843	+0.80%
2007	1,903	+0.40%
2012	1,766	−1.48%
2017	1,772	+0.07%
2023	1,994	+1.99%

Source: EHESS (1793-1999) and INSEE

== History ==
At the start of World War I, the Battle of Lorette lasted for 12 months, from October 1914 to October 1915, resulting in high casualties on both sides: 100,000 killed and as many wounded. A French national cemetery was built on 13 hectares nearby and comprises 20,000 graves, laid out irrespective of rank or military training. General Barbot has a private soldier buried next to him, on his right. In eight ossuaries, around the base of the lantern tower, are the remains of 22,970 unidentified soldiers. A portion of the cemetery has been reserved for Muslim soldiers.

In 2014, to mark the centenary of the start of World War I, French President François Hollande and German defence minister Ursula von der Leyen inaugurated a memorial for Armistice Day.

== Sights ==
- The church of St. Pierre, dating from the twentieth century.
- The ruins of the fifteenth century church, destroyed in World War I.
- The war museum.

== See also ==
- Communes of the Pas-de-Calais department
