= First Battle of Artois =

Battle during the First World War

- Part of the Western Front of the First World War
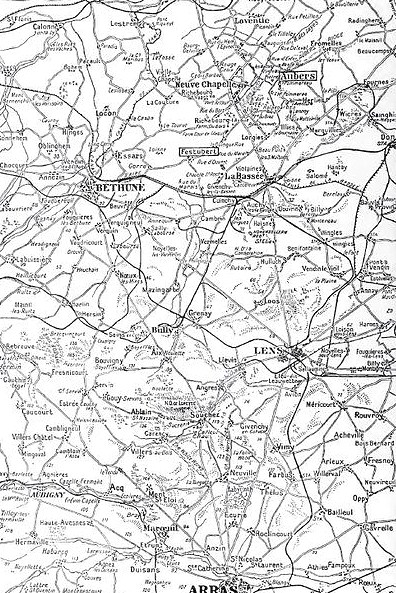
- Area of operations, 1914
Date	17 December 1914 – 13 January 1915
Location	Artois, France 50°30′N 02°30′E
Result	Indecisive

Belligerents
France; United Kingdom	German Empire

Commanders and leaders
Joseph Joffre	Erich von Falkenhayn; Rupprecht of Bavaria
- Artois, a region of northern France of around 4,000 km^{2} (1,500 sq mi) around Arras, Saint-Omer, Lens and Béthune.

The First Battle of Artois (17 December 1914 – 13 January 1915) was fought during the First World War between the French and German armies on the Western Front. The battle was the first offensive move on the Western Front by either side after the end of the First Battle of Ypres in November 1914. The French attack failed to break the stalemate.

== Background ==
During what became known as the Race to the Sea the Battle of Arras (1–4 October) had been fought, after which local operations, particularly on the Lorette Spur, continued during the First Battle of Flanders to the north.

=== Subsequent operations ===
In May 1915, the Tenth Army conducted an offensive known as the Second Battle of Artois. The Third Battle of Artois, sometimes called the Artois–Loos Offensive, took place from 25 September to 15 October 1915.
