= Emilienne =

Émilienne is a feminine given name. Notable people with the name include:

- Émilienne Demougeot (1910–1994), French historian
- Émilienne Galicier (1911–2007), French politician
- Émilienne Mopty, French Anti-Nazi
- Émilienne Moreau-Evrard, French World War I resistance member
- Émilienne Morin (1901–1991), French anarcho-syndicalist
- Émilienne Raoul (born 1945), Republic of the Congo politician
- Émilienne d'Alençon, French dancer, actress and courtesan
- Émilienne de Sère, French singer and stage actress
