= 1941 Nord-Pas-de-Calais miners' strike =

Major labor strike in occupied France

- Grève patriotique des 100 000 mineurs du Nord-Pas-de-Calais; Part of German occupation of France during World War II
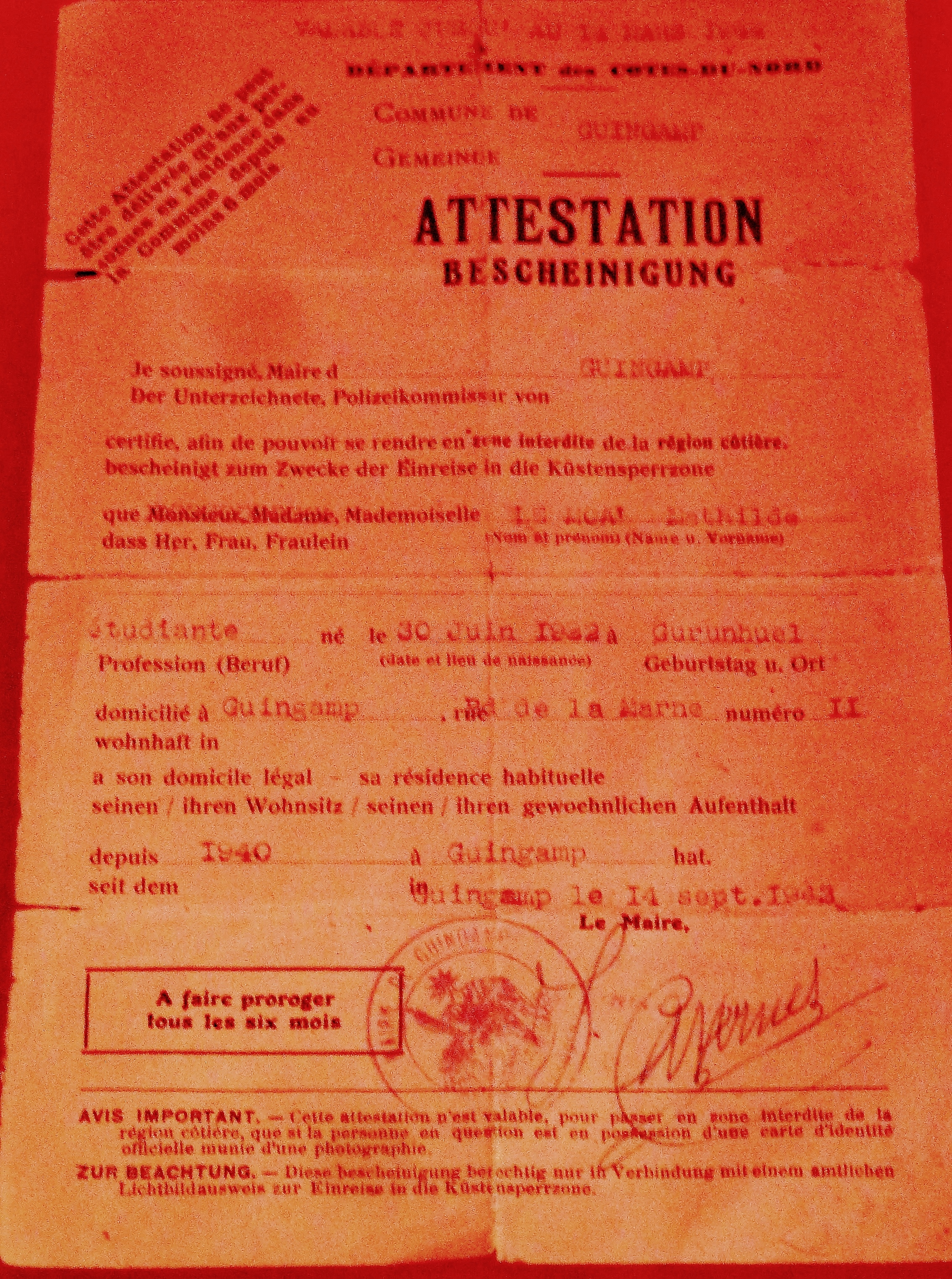
- Certificate allowing a person to enter a prohibited area (Resistance Museum in Argoat, Saint-Connan)
- Date: 27 May – 10 June 1941 (2 weeks)
- Location: Military Administration in Belgium and Northern France

Casualties
- Deaths: 139
- Arrested: Up to 450

The 1941 Nord-Pas-de-Calais miners' strike, also known as the patriotic strike of the 100,000 miners of Nord-Pas-de-Calais (Picard: Grève patriotique des 100 000 mineurs du Nord-Pas-de-Calais) or the 10-day strike, lasted from the 27th of May to the 10th of June 1941 and was the first large-scale strike under Nazi occupation. It was one of the largest and longest strike to occur in Nazi-occupied Europe.

== Background ==
=== Nord-Pas-de-Calais ===
Nord-Pas-de-Calais was occupied by German soldiers during the 1870–1871 Franco-Prussian War and during World War I. During WWI, the region was divided by the Western Front and the German-occupied Eastern half experienced severe conditions. As a result, the area had strong anti-German sentiments and communists in the region were more likely to be active members of the French Resistance than those in other areas of France.

The mining basin in Nord-Pas-de-Calais was responsible for 60% of the national production of coal and had notable textile and metalworking industries. This industrialisation attracted many immigrants, particularly from Poland and Italy. Many of the Italians were fleeing fascism. The Italian and Polish immigrants would go on to make up a disproportionately high number of the militants in the French Resistance.

In 1940, Nord-Pas-de-Calais was invaded by Nazi Germany and made into a 'Forbidden Zone'. The regional administration was called Oberfeldkommandantur (OFK) 670 and was answerable only to German military commander General Niehoff. Travel and mail services in and out of the zone were limited and telephone communications were cut off. The mines were reopened on the 15th of June 1940 and resumed normal activity in September.

Thousands of miners fled to escape occupation or were conscripted causing a labour shortage. Mining companies requested the return of French prisoners of war who had experience as miners. German authorities agreed to release engineers but not workers.

=== The French Communist Party ===
Most of the trade union leaders and elected municipal officials also fled before German forces took control of the region. Many of these positions were then filled by communists who had served in these positions until the anti-communist laws of 1939.

The leaders of the French Communist Party, based in Paris, took a neutral position between Germany and the United Kingdom and focused on criticising French capitalism and the Vichy government. In contrast, many communists in Nord-Pas-de-Calais took the position that the war would end in communist revolution. Communicating with Paris from the Forbidden Zone was incredibly difficult which allowed communists in the area to act largely independently.

== Early events ==
I would rather see my country occupied by the Germans than my factory occupied by the workers. - A Lille factory owner to his trade newspaper

Employers dismissed Popular Front social legislation of their own initiative, decreasing the piece-rate and the minimum wage. At the same time, German authorities demanded an increase in productivity of 25% over 1938 levels. In December 1940, the work day was lengthened to 8 hours and 15 minutes before being lengthened further to 9 hours. Some miners complained of an increase in injuries and deaths due to the dissolution of labour unions and the safety delegates associated with them. In 1941, new working practices with payments based on collective results were progressively introduced to the pits. These new conditions represented a loss of pay for some miners. Meanwhile, food shortages created a black market that made food increasingly unaffordable for the miners. Miners travelling into the countryside to look for cheaper food contributed to an increase in absences at the mines. There was also a shortage of soap.

August Lecoeur and Julien Hapiot acted as leaders of the French Communist Party in the region and prepared for future confrontation. Lecoeur was captured but escaped and returned before obtaining a mimeograph machine. They arranged hideouts and underground cells and stockpiled weapons. Some miners sabotaged coal production in acts of resistance against the German authorities.

== Spontaneous strikes ==
Steve Cushion claims that numerous half day strikes occurred between August and October 1940. Darryl Holter states that eight work stoppages, most lasting for a day or two, took place between August and October 1940. On the 9th of August, a strike was carried out in defence of Michel Brulé, a militant communist who had been dismissed by the company. In response, German authorities had him arrested. This caused the strike to spread until Brulé was released on the 11th.

On the 14th of October, Niehoff threatened to take two hostages per pit, putting a temporary stop to strikes. The Chamber of Mines lengthened the workday by half an hour and linked production levels and wages. Miners responded by turning up to work half an hour late and taking longer meal breaks in one pit. When threatened with punishment, the miners would cease and another pit would begin responding in the same way. This action was brought to an end when German soldiers were brought in and arrested miners at random. Almost 200 miners were arrested during this action.

On the 11th of November, 35% of miners walked out in a spontaneous strike. This strike may have been motivated by BBC broadcasts. Demonstrations against food shortage were also carried out between January and May 1941. Around 80 strikers were arrested by German authorities in response to these demonstrations. On the 1st of May, inscriptions, tricolor and red flags appeared and leaflets were distributed. Thousands of people surrounded the statue of Joan of Arc in a demonstration. In Belgium, the strike of the 100,000 began. The French demonstrations ended with riots in Lens and Avion. Gestapo officers in Lille recruited employers, the Police and the Gendarmerie to create a list of known communists.

== The strike ==
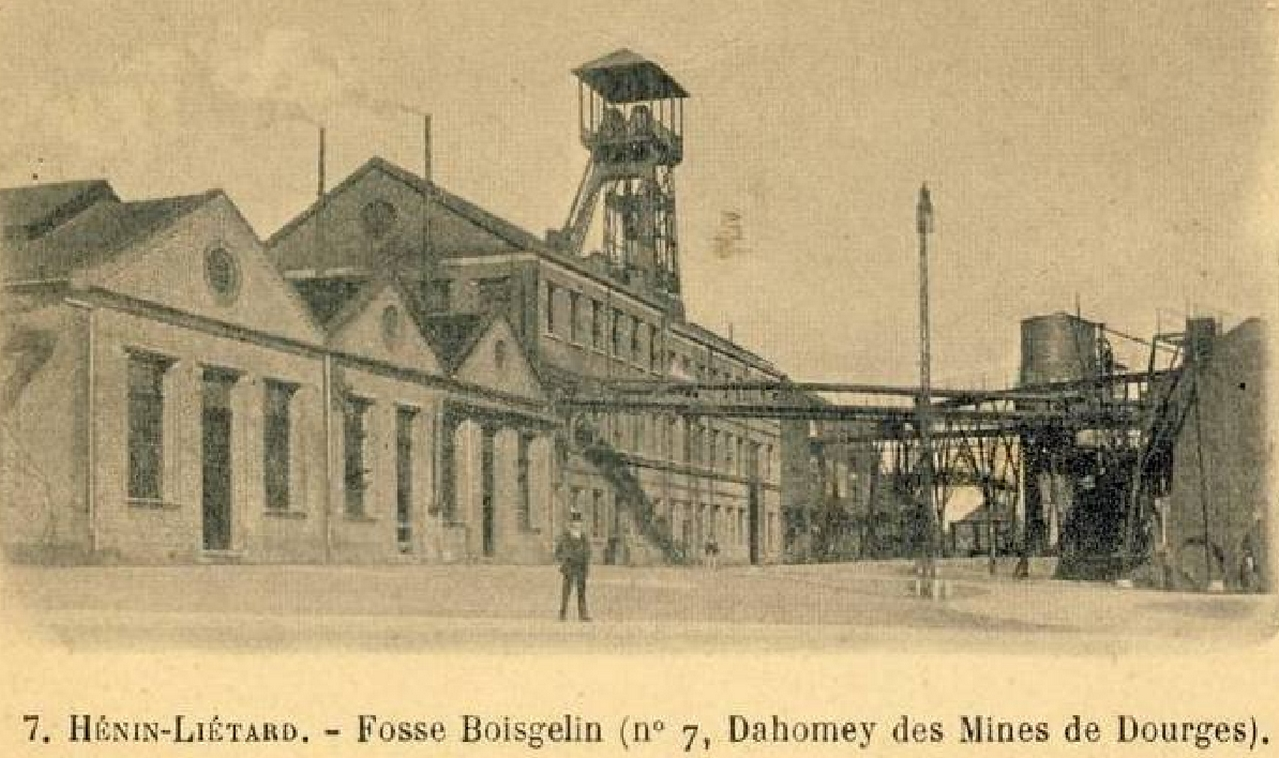
Pit 7 in Dourges

When the new working conditions were introduced to pit number 7 at Dourges on the 26th of May, Brulé and other miners met underground and agreed to strike. The strike began on the morning of the 27th of May with flying pickets spreading the strike. Demands were presented to management and included salary increases, better working conditions and improved supplies. The first arrests were carried out on the 28th of May. Strikers from pit 7 were joined by four other pits on the 28th of May. After news of the strike reached German authorities, a number of arrests were made. The Agache factory in Seclin went on strike in solidarity.

However, various communication problems limited the strike with numerous mines remaining open. Steve Cushion states that General Niehoff ordered for two posters to be created within the first few days of the strike, one ordered all miners to return to work and the other announced the arrest of 11 miners and 2 miners wives. Étienne Dejonghe states that these posters did not go up until the 2nd of June. Cushion claims these posters helped resolve communication problems, stating that by the 2nd of June 80% of the workforce were on strike. Dejonghe and Holter makes the same claim for the 4th of June.

The French police struggled to break picket lines so German soldiers and the German military police, particularly the 16th security regiment, were drafted into the region. The military police established a headquarters within the Lens Mining Company offices. To avoid indictment, miners from one pit would picket another where they were unknown. As the strike continued, the demand to release imprisoned miners took on increasing importance.

After the 31st May, German soldiers and the French police began arresting miners after dawn raids and the Luftwaffe began carrying out low-level flypasts. Many public spaces were closed and the sale of tobacco and alcohol was forbidden. The Kléber barracks in Lille and the Vincent barracks in Valenciennes were transformed into internment camps. A call to return to work on the 9th of June was issued and German soldiers were withdrawn on the 10th.

=== The role of women ===
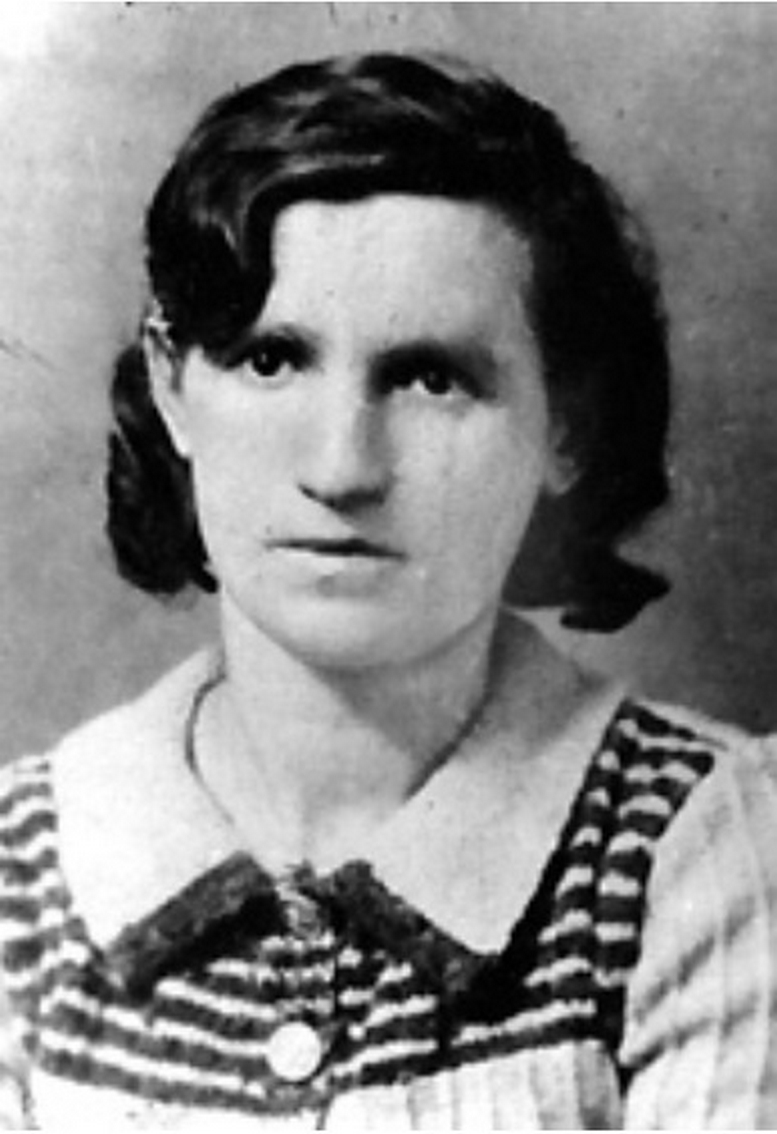
Émilienne Mopty

Women took on picket duty and were active participants in the strike. They lead rallies and blocked the entrance to the pits. Cushion states that, on the 29th of May, Émilienne Mopty organised and lead 2,000 women in a demonstration outside company offices in Billy-Montigny. The German military police were unable to arrest any of the women after they linked arms. Similar demonstrations occurred at Lievin on the 31st and Hénin on the 2nd of June.

After these events, the following proclamation was issued by the OFK:

By order of the Oberfeldkommandant, from the 6th of June, women are strictly forbidden to leave their homes in the half-hour before work starts.

=== The role of Polish miners ===
Rudolf Larysz led a group of Polish communists who organised the Polish miners who made up 29% of the workforce. German military workers and local police attempted to march Polish workers to the mines but were stalled by a large group of protesting women.

== Immediate aftermath ==
On the 16th of June, OFK 670 organised the distribution of clothing, food and soap to the miners. The Vichy government increased wages for miners on the 17th of June. In total, 460,000 tonnes of coal production were lost due to the strike, enough to threaten electricity production in Paris.

The employers gave the name of suspected leaders to the police. Cushion claims that approximately 450 arrests were made with 270 persons being deported to concentration camps in Germany. Of those deported, 130 never returned. In addition, 9 communists were taken as hostages before being shot. Roger Pannequin stated that 325 miners were arrested, 231 sent to work camps and 94 imprisoned. He also states that 9 hostages were shot.

== Aftermath and legacy ==
Communist militants in Nord-Pas-de-Calais recruited numerous new members after the strike. Over half of the acts of sabotage and armed attack in the French Resistance in 1942 and 1943 occurred in Nord-Pas-de-Calais. Many of the notable persons in the strike, including Auguste Lecoeur, Julien Hapiot, Michel Brulé and Emilienne Mopty went on to be active in the French Resistance.

A monument in Nord-Pas-de-Calais commemorates the strike.

=== Further strikes ===
From 1939 to 1943, there was an increase of over 40,000 in the number of miners but daily production of coal dropped from 107,000 tonnes to 87,000 tonnes. There were a number of disputes regarding the size of food rations. On the 11th of September 1943, German authorities ordered that miners work on Sundays. This order was withdrawn after 11 pits struck. The order was repeated on the 8th of October with Bruay German troops occupying pitheads with machine guns. 50,000 miners went on strike and railway workers from Lens and Bethune began to strike in solidarity on the 16th. The strike continued until the 20th and 800 miners were arrested. Of those arrested, 156 remained imprisoned and 65 were sent to German concentration camps. Wages were increased by 18%, miners were not required to work on Sundays and clothing and boots were issued.
