= February strike =

1941 labour strike in the German-occupied Netherlands during WWII

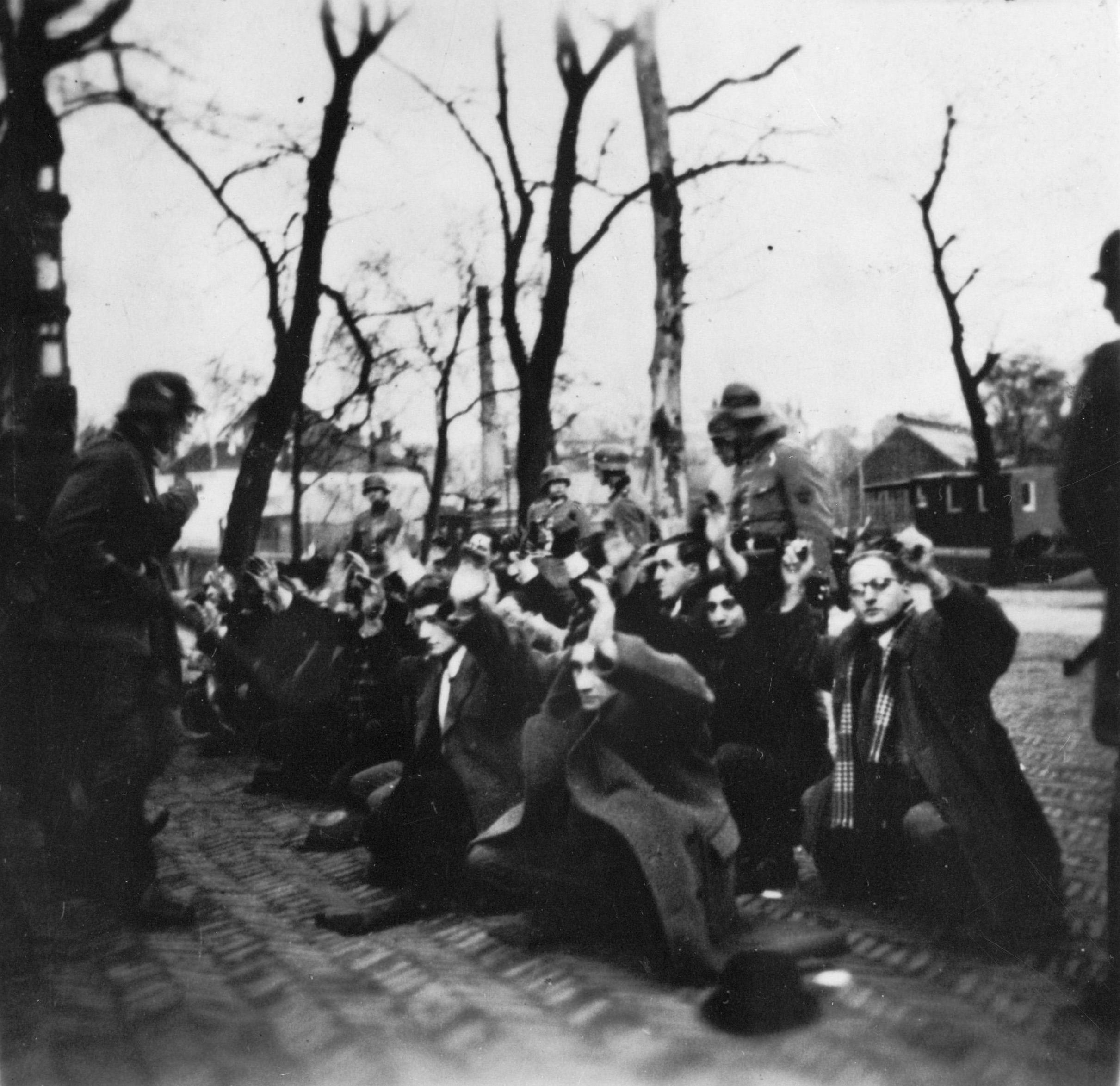
Arrest of Dutch Jews by the Nazis, February 1941 (Jonas Daniël Meijerplein)

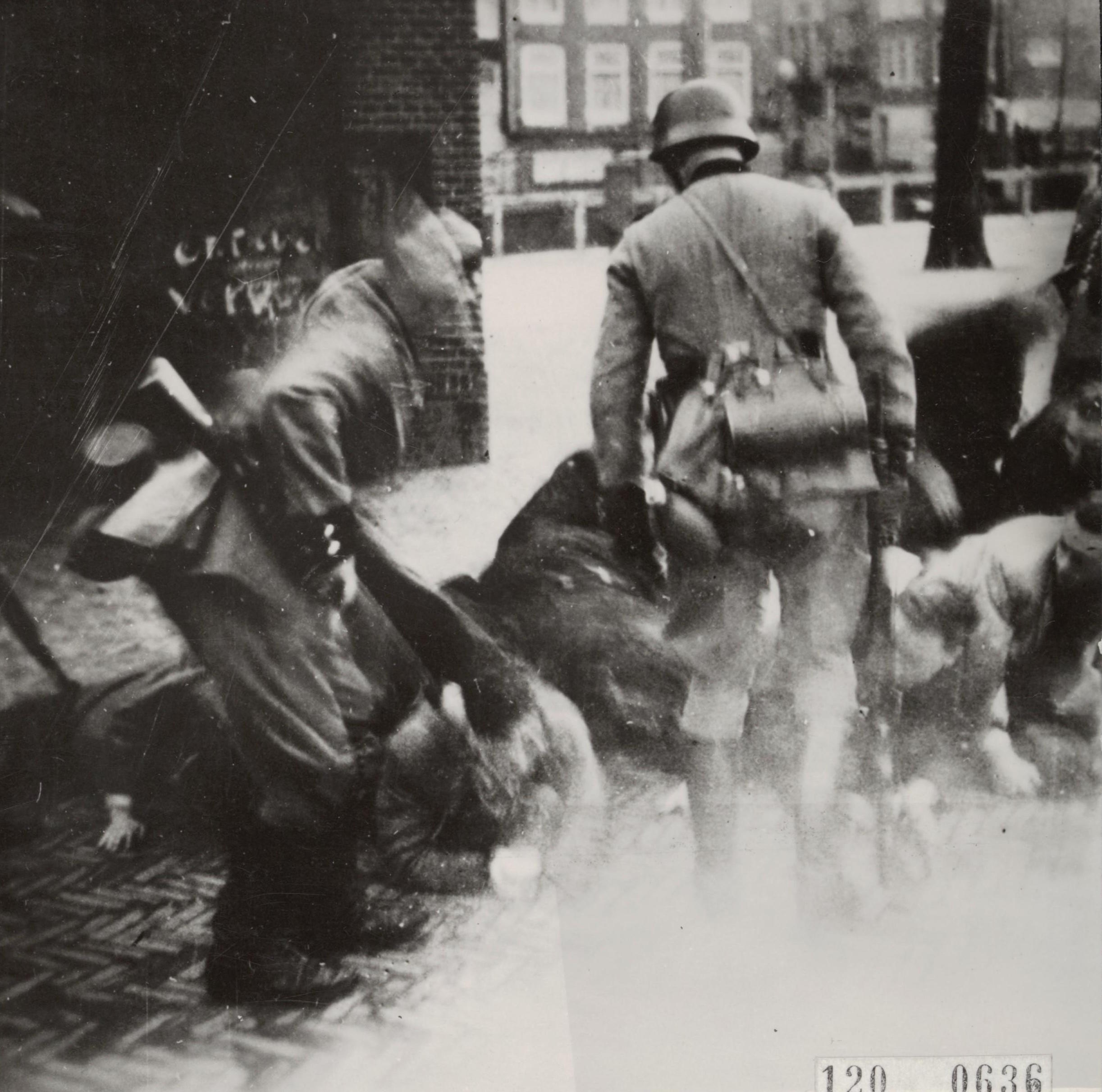
German soldiers at the Jonas Daniël Meijerplein during the raids

The February strike (Dutch: Februaristaking) of 1941 was a general strike in the Nazi-occupied Netherlands during World War II. It was organized by the outlawed Communist Party of the Netherlands in defence of persecuted Dutch Jews and against the anti-Jewish measures and the activities of Nazism in general.

The direct causes were a series of arrests and pogroms held by the Germans in the Jewish neighbourhood of Amsterdam, the Jodenbuurt. It started on 25 February 1941 and lasted for two days. By 26 February, 300,000 people had joined the strike. The Germans harshly suppressed the strike, which mostly dissipated by 27 February.

The February strike is considered to be the first public protest against the Nazis in occupied Europe. No major Dutch public action against the Nazis came after it, as the Reichskommissar of the Netherlands, Arthur Seyss-Inquart, warned the public that there would be draconian consequences. There was a smaller public action against the deportation of Jews to be organized by non-Jews in Berlin, known as the Rosenstrasse protest.

== Background and cause ==
The Netherlands surrendered to Nazi Germany in May 1940, and the first anti-Jewish measures—the barring of Jews from the air-raid defence services—began in June 1940. In November 1940 all Jews were removed from public positions, including universities, which led directly to student protests in Leiden and elsewhere. Meanwhile, there was an increasing feeling of unrest by workers in Amsterdam, especially the workers at the shipyards in Amsterdam-Noord, who were threatened with forced labour in Germany.

As tensions rose, the Dutch Nazi party Nationaal-Socialistische Beweging and its militant arm, the WA (Weerbaarheidsafdeling), were involved in a series of provocations in Jewish neighbourhoods in Amsterdam. This led to a series of street battles between the WA and Jewish self-defence groups and their supporters, and culminated in a pitched battle on 11 February 1941 on the Waterlooplein. WA member Hendrik Koot was badly wounded and died of his injuries on 14 February.

On 12 February, German soldiers, assisted by Dutch police, encircled and cordoned the old Jewish neighbourhood from the rest of the city by putting up barbed wire, raising bridges, and setting up police checkpoints. The neighbourhood was now forbidden for non-Jews.

On 19 February, the German Grüne Polizei stormed into the Koco ice-cream parlour on Van Woustraat in Rivierenbuurt. In the fight that ensued, several police officers were wounded. Revenge came in the weekend of 22–23 February, when a large-scale pogrom was undertaken by the Germans in which 425 Jewish men of age 20–35 were taken hostage and imprisoned in Kamp Schoorl and eventually sent to the Buchenwald and Mauthausen concentration camps, where most of them had died within a year. Of the 425, only two survived the war.

== Strike ==
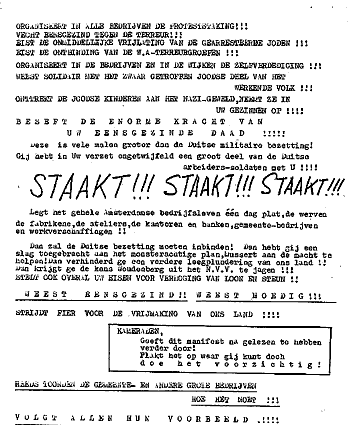
Leaflet announcing the strike

After the pogrom, on 24 February, an open-air meeting was held on the Noordermarkt to organise a strike to protest against the pogrom and the forced labour to Germany. The Communist Party of the Netherlands, which was made illegal by the Germans, printed and spread a call to strike throughout the city the next morning. The first to strike were the city's tram drivers, followed by other city services as well as companies like department store De Bijenkorf and schools. Eventually 300,000 people joined in the strike, which brought much of the city to a halt and caught the Germans by surprise.

The strike grew spontaneously as other workers followed the example of the tram drivers, and spread to other areas, including Zaanstad and Kennemerland in the west; Bussum, Hilversum and Utrecht in the east; and in the south.

In response, a curfew was declared and a German police battalion and two SS Totenkopf regiments were drafted into the city. Protests were violently quelled, often by gunfire. Four strikers were later executed by firing squad, 22 sentenced to prison, and the city was ordered to pay fifteen million guilders in restitution.

The suppression was successful, and most strikers were back at work by 27 February. Although ultimately unsuccessful, the strike was significant in that it was the first and only large-scale direct action against the Nazis' treatment of Jews in Europe.

The next strikes would be student strikes in November 1941 and the so-called "milk strike" (because of the farmers’ refusal to supply milk) in April–May in 1943, which ushered in a period of armed covert resistance on a national scale.

The rest of Nazi-occupied Europe also went on strike later on, the Greeks in April 1942, the Danes from the summer of 1943, the Luxemburgers in August 1942, the Belgians in May 1941, a strike in Norway in September 1941 when shipyard workers lost their daily quota of milk, and the Northern French miners in May–June 1941. However, the February strike 1941 in Amsterdam was the only strike against how Jews were treated by the Germans in Nazi-occupied Europe.

== Remembrance ==
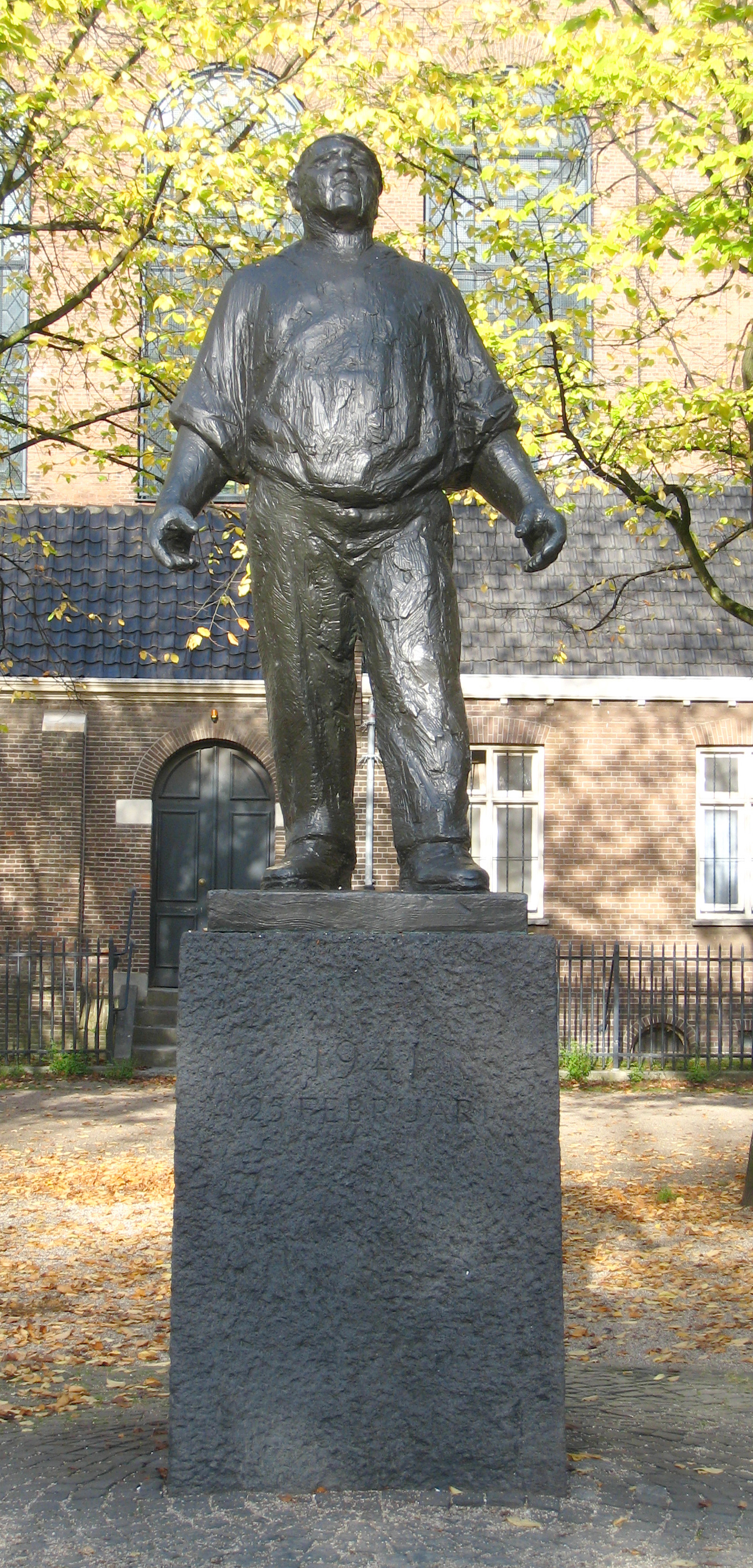
De Dokwerker (the dock worker) on the Jonas Daniël Meijerplein in Amsterdam

The strike is remembered each year on 25 February, with a march past the De Dokwerker, the memorial made for the strike in 1951 and first unveiled in December 1952. This statue was made by Dutch sculptor Mari Andriessen. All political parties, as well as the city public transport authorities and organizations of Holocaust survivors, participate in the remembrance. Three communist organizers were shot to death after the strike and 12 communist organizers were sent to jails in Germany, but during the Cold War, the communists were forced to remember the strike separately from other political groups. For many years after the war, Dutch officials publicly denied contributions by the communists to the strike. In 2010, the Israeli Holocaust museum Yad Vashem collectively awarded the strikers the title Righteous Among the Nations.

== See also ==
- Rosenstrasse protest: A successful 1943 protest against the deportation of Berlin Jews organized by their non-Jewish spouses and other family members.
- Strike of the 100,000: communist-led strike in occupied Belgium with the objective to demand a wage increase although it was also an act of passive resistance to the German occupation.
- Milk Strike: Norwegian strike in September 1941 against rationing of milk.
- 1942 Luxembourgish general strike, 31 August 1942 against a German directive that conscripted young Luxembourgers into the Wehrmacht.
- Rescue of the Danish Jews

== Bibliography ==
- Jong, Dr. L. de (1985) [1966]. De Bezetting (in Dutch) (3rd ed.). Amsterdam: Querido. pp. 135–178. ISBN 90-214-6898-0.
- Sijes, Dr. B. A. (1978) [1954]. De Februaristaking (in Dutch). Dutch Institute for War Documentation. Amsterdam: H. J. W. Becht. ISBN 90-230-0290-3.
- Presser, Dr. J. (December 1965) [1965]. Ondergang (6th ed.). The Hague: Staatsuitgeverij. ISBN 90-12-04893-1.
- Manheim, Jack. Memoirs of the Dutch Underground 1940–1945 – Why me? (England: Amazon, 2017). ISBN 1521902240
