= Strike of the 100,000 =

1941 strike in German-occupied Belgium

- Grève des 100 000; Part of German occupation of Belgium during World War II
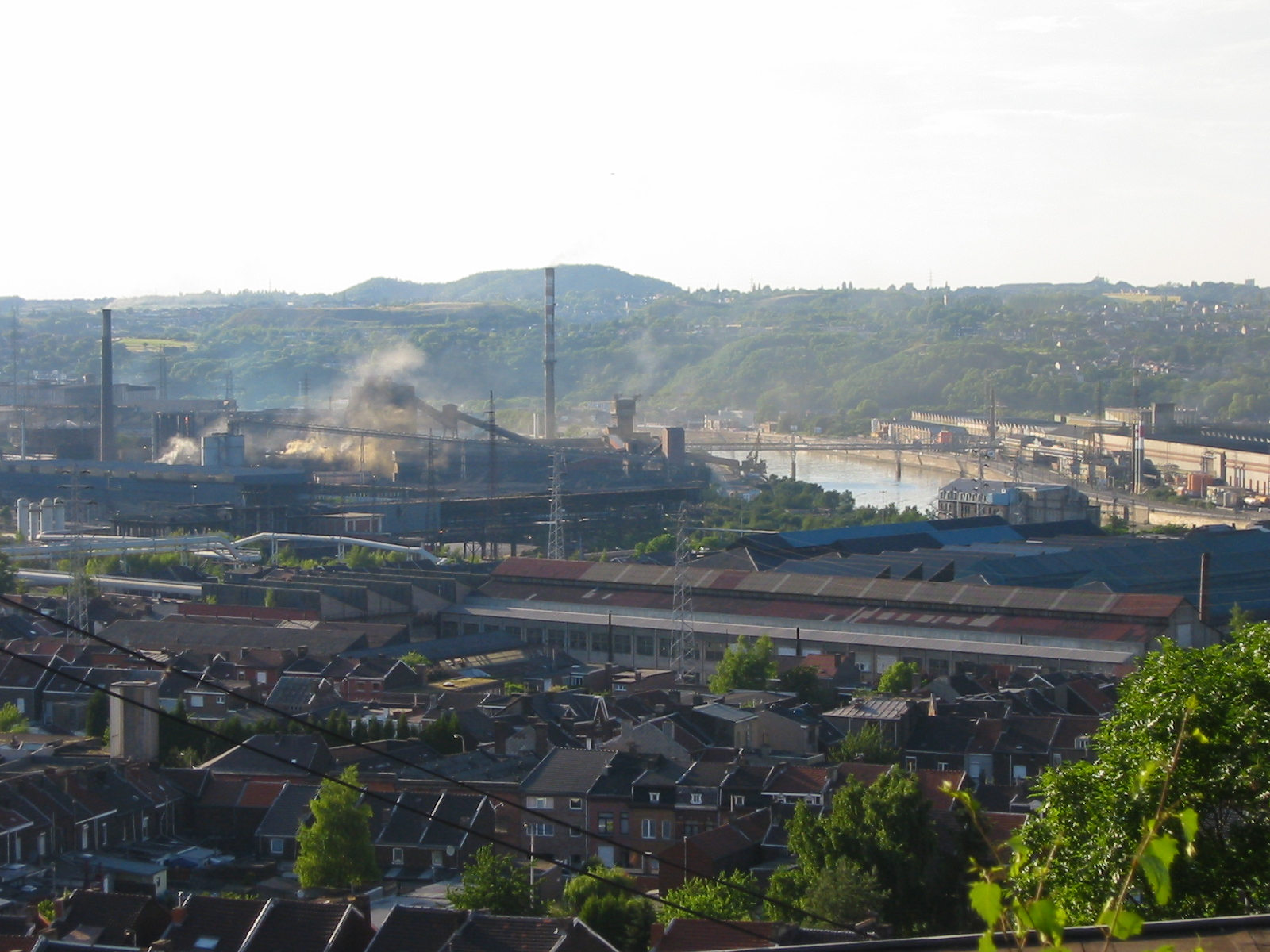
- Modern-day view of the Cockerill-Sambre steel works in Seraing where the strike started
- Date: 10-18 May 1941
- Location: Military Administration in Belgium and Northern France
- Caused by: Passive resistance
- Methods: Strike action

Parties
Workers; Communist Party of Belgium	Nazis

Lead figures
Julien Lahaut	Alexander von Falkenhausen

Number
70,000	

Casualties
- Arrested: 400
- Followed by: 1941 Nord-Pas-de-Calais miners' strike

The Strike of the 100,000 (Walloon: Grève des 100 000) was an 8-day strike in German-occupied Belgium that took place from 10 to 18 May 1941. It was led by Julien Lahaut, head of the Belgian Communist Party (Parti communiste de Belgique or PCB) even though the Molotov–Ribbentrop Pact was still in force. The object of the strike was to demand a wage increase, but it was also an act of passive resistance to the German occupation.

The strike originated at the Cockerill steel works (Cockerill Fonderie) in the industrial town of Seraing, in eastern Belgium, on 10 May 1941. The date significantly marked the first anniversary of the German invasion of Belgium. News spread quickly through the Province of Liège and brought many other workers out on solidarity actions. The strike also spread into the industrial Province of Hainaut in the west and also to the neighbouring Limburg in Flanders. It is estimated that 70,000 workers participated in the strike at its height, though never the 100,000 supposed by its popular name. The actions received widespread coverage in the national underground press of the Belgian Resistance and even achieved limited support from the middle and upper classes who had traditionally opposed labour militancy.

In order to end the disruption, the Germans were forced to agree to a substantial wages increase of eight percent. The strike soon finished and ended officially on 18 May. In its aftermath, the German authorities worried that it could be repeated. 400 workers were arrested in September 1942 on suspicion of planning a similar action. Further important strikes did, however, take place in Belgium in November 1942 and February 1943.

In the aftermath of the strike, the start of the German invasion of the Soviet Union (June 1941) led to the end of the limited toleration of Belgian communists. Lahaut was deported to a concentration camp in Germany, and many other strikers were also incarcerated in the Citadel of Huy.

A similar strike, inspired by the success of the Strike of the 100,000, took place later the same month in the Nord and Pas de Calais mining basins in Northern France, which formed part of the same German administrative area as Belgium. It was judged by the French newspaper Le Monde in 2001 to have been one of the most spectacular acts of the French Resistance. The strike, which broke out on 27 May and lasted until 9 June, brought 17,000 miners (around 80 percent of the regional total) out to protest pay and food shortages.

== See also ==
- Belgian Resistance
- February strike of 1941, protesting against the German anti-Jewish measures in the Netherlands
- Milk strike of September 1941 against food rationing in Occupied Norway.
- 1942 Luxembourgish general strike protesting against conscription into the German Army.
