= Hendrik Koot =

Dutch criminal (1898–1941)

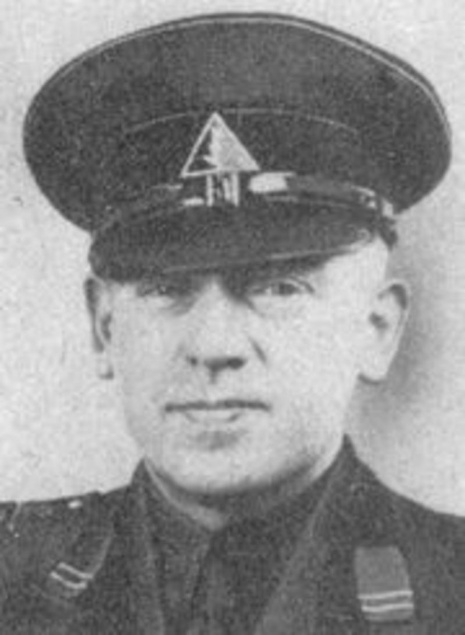
Henrik Koot in 1940

Hendrik Evert Koot (5 April 1898 – 14 February 1941) was a Dutch collaborator with the German occupying forces during World War II. A member of the WA, the paramilitary wing of the National Socialist Movement in the Netherlands (NSB), he was beaten up by members of a local knokploeg ("action group") in Amsterdam on 11 February 1941. His injuries were so severe that he died a few days later. His death was seized by the German authorities to start raids in the Jodenbuurt, the Amsterdam Jewish quarters, which in turn led to the February strike. Another element of Nazi retaliation was the installation of a Judenrat in Amsterdam: the Jewish Council of Amsterdam.

== Early life ==
Hendrik Koot was born and raised in Amsterdam. He joined the National Socialist Movement in the Netherlands (NSB) in 1935, with his wife, Elisabeth van Groningen, the latter being apparently influenced by a speech by the NSB founder, Anton Mussert, at the Concertgebouw. At some point, he worked for Asscher, a Jewish diamond cutter. They had eight children; the eldest two had gone to sea to join the merchant navy, but all of the others joined various Nazi and fascist organizations. Two joined the SS, one the Dutch Landstorm and another the Nationale Jeugdstorm (the Dutch version of the Hitler Youth). One of Koot's sisters had married a German soldier, and another married a Dutch SS volunteer. After Koot's death, his wife married another WA man.

The Koot family had a winning lottery ticket in 1932 and, combined with savings, that allowed them to buy a store that sold equipment and supplies for textile manufactures to which moved on the Vijzelstraat (no. 88) in 1938 and renamed Hako, for "H. Koot".

He moved up in the NSB ranks as well and quickly rose to the rank of sergeant. During the 1941 events, he had attained the rank of opperwachtmeester, the highest rank for a non-commissioned officer.

== Events of February 1941 ==
By January 1941, far-reaching measures to restrict Jews had been enacted, and Hanns Albin Rauter, the Austrian-born SS and Police Leader in the Netherlands, had ordered thugs to collaborate with the Nazis in beating up Jews and creating civil unrest in the hope to provoke Jewish resistance.

At the same time, though, Hans Böhmcker, the representative in Amsterdam for Arthur Seyss-Inquart, Reichskommissar for the Netherlands, had forbidden WA members from entering Jewish neighbourhoods.

Koot in fact entered such a neighborhood, with some 40 other WA members (one of his sons was also there and was also wounded). He got beaten up by a Jewish knokploeg on 11 February 1941, on the Waterlooplein. After Koot's death, Rauter himself wrote an op-ed in the NSB paper Volk en Vaderland that salaciously described the act: "a Jew had ripped open the victim's artery with his teeth and sucked his blood out", in "an obvious allusion to ritual murder". According to the Dutch historian Jacques Presser, in the lurid descriptions of the murder, the Nazis betrayed "their own bestiality rather than describe the actual facts". Those lurid details are not confirmed in the police reports, which had gotten lost but were found again, and are available through the Amsterdam City Archives.

Het Parool, the resistance paper, reported on 25 February that Koot had died after enduring one single wound, a blow to the head by a heavy object such as an axe or a club, which is mentioned in the police report of 18 February 1941. Koot's funeral took place on 17 February, at Zorgvlied cemetery. A funeral procession, complete with marching band, preceded his horse-drawn carriage, two thousand Nazis with flags marched through town and Wolfsangels were affixed to the grave.

Response was immediate. The Jewish neighborhood was sealed off by German authorities, which effectively began the Amsterdam ghetto,) and a Judenrat was put into place.

Protests broke out, and the raid on an ice cream parlor, a known hangout for a Jewish knokploeg, saw German police forces being attacked in retaliation and possibly sprayed with acid. The Germans decided to round up a large number of Jewish men, which gave the local communist resistance groups an opportunity to agitate the population enough to start a strike.

Widespread strikes started the following Tuesday, 25 February. The Dutch police response was moderate, and the Nazi authorities were displeased. Troops were sent in to break the strike, and posters explaining the death of Koot were put up in an attempt to justify military action.
