= April–May strikes =

April May strikes

The April–May strikes (also known as the milk strike or mine strike) were labour strikes in 1943 in the Netherlands against forced labour during the Second World War and it is considered to be the most extensive protest in occupied Europe as well as the largest strike in Dutch history.

== Background ==
The reason for this national strike was the announcement on 29 April 1943 that Dutch former soldiers who had fought in 1940 had to report to work in Germany for the Arbeitseinsatz. Because of the many German casualties during the battle of Stalingrad, extra manpower was needed to keep the German war industry going. Dutch people who refused to work in Germany could count on 'the strictest measures'.

== Strike ==
The strike started on Thursday 29 April 1943 at Machinefabriek Gebr. Stork & Co in Hengelo in Overijssel and spread rapidly throughout the Netherlands. The strike leader, Jan Berend Vlam, who had just been released after eight months in Camp Sint-Michielsgestel, organized meetings at his home, which eventually led to the strikes. Gradually, the strike spread to companies in almost all of the provinces in the country. More than 500,000 people eventually laid off work.

This strike is also known as the Milk Strike, because farmers did not deliver milk to the factories and gave their milk away free of charge to the citizens or scatter it over the grasslands. In the Mining region of southern Limburg, the strike was called the Mining Strike and was supported by the Roman Catholic Church.

Deputy Mayor Steggink of Twente refused to hand over a list of at least 20,947 strikers to Beauftragter Weidlich, who had arrived on Thursday evening. Despite the arrival of 200 additional law enforcement officers that night, more people went on strike the next day.

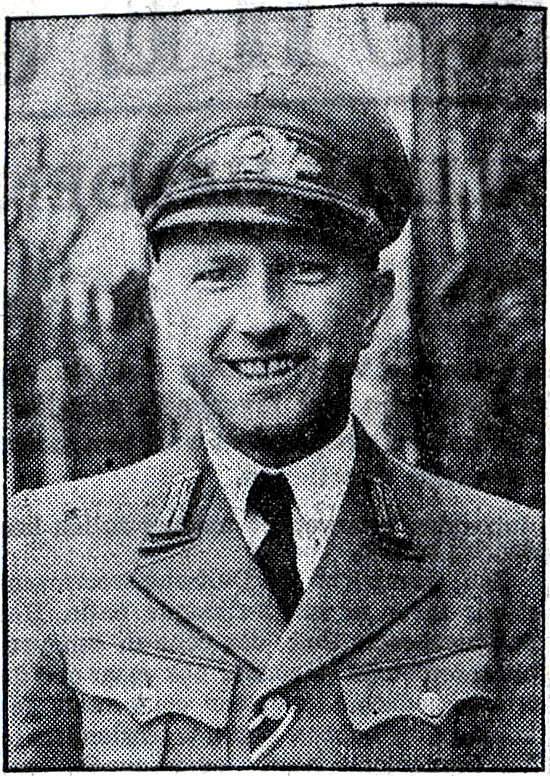
Beauftragter Weidlich

On Friday, April 30, the pressure on the mayors of Twente increased. Beauftragter Weidlich and Hauptmann Ney, commander of 'Organisation Todt', warned that serious bloodshed would occur if the strike was not lifted. However, disappointment set in for the strikers when the Dutch railways continued to operate, and there was no activity in Rotterdam, The Hague, and Amsterdam, where the memory of the bloody aftermath of the February strike of 1941 was still fresh.

The Milk Strike, involving around 200,000 participants, was the largest in Dutch history and is considered a turning point in the occupation. The occupiers learned that they had failed to get the Dutch to adopt National Socialism, and the Dutch witnessed the terror of the Germans, which gave the resistance a significant boost. In 1943, the manifesto included a statement of fidelity with the text, "The enemy has now completely thrown off the mask. The myth of the Fuehrer's magnanimity has come to an end. The Germans are now acknowledging what we are: enemies, and not part of the Greater Germanic Community."

== Throughout the country ==
Overijssel, a province in the eastern part of the Netherlands, played a significant role in the April-May strike of 1943. The strike began in Hengelo at the Machine Factory Stork when Femy Efftink, the operator, spread the news of the strike to anyone who called and asked them to join. The message quickly spread to other companies. The strike extended to farmers who stopped milk deliveries and traffic services on the following day. However, the Germans reacted harshly in Enschede, announcing police standing law for anyone still outside at 8 p.m. on Friday evening. Before then, they had already started shooting people at random in the streets, even those who were in their own garden.

There was also a strike in Haaksbergen, where Lieutenant Schatz ordered the staff to be questioned about the strike. Nine men and women were then put out of the car and seven men were killed immediately and two managed to escape. A.B. Wijlens was arrested the next day at the factory and subsequently shot, while Herman Goering was the only one who could escape and went into hiding. He was the only one who could recount what had happened.

In the provinces of Groningen and Drenthe, the strike was not limited to workers alone. In fact, several farms belonging to members of the Dutch National Socialist Movement (NSB) were set on fire by the strikers, causing the night sky to turn red on May 2-3. The town of Marum also joined the strike by rendering milk trucks and boats inoperable, and blocking roads with trees to prevent milk deliveries from resuming. In response, a German sergeant and his soldiers stationed in the small town of Trimunt arrested 18 people in Marum, including a thirteen-year-old boy, and locked them up in a barrack near Trimunt. On the same day, the prisoners were shot in groups of four, with the young boy falling to the ground after a German volley. The Germans did not inform the mayor of Marum of the killings, leaving the fate of the victims uncertain for a long time. It was only months later that the mayor received goods that had belonged to the victims.

=== Southern provinces ===
In the night of 29-30 April, over a thousand workers at the State Mine Maurits in the southern provinces went on strike, and by Friday afternoon, all mines, including both lignite companies, had joined the strike. Civil servants also followed suit. However, the strike was met with violence, and on Monday, seven men were executed. This resulted in larger strikes, including on bus and tram services, causing traffic congestion and tug captains deserting in the Juliana Canal. Farmers and milk drivers also joined the strike until Sunday. Drs. L. Moonen played a significant role in the resistance in Roermond, including persevering the strikes.

=== Gelderland and Utrecht ===
The first strike in Utrecht started at the breadfactory where half of the staff went on strike. Various office staff in the area followed, but the attention was mainly paid to the Dutch Railways. Despite the management's decision not to go on strike, women working at the telephone exchange of the Dutch Railways did go on strike, led by G. Hekkert, who was later sentenced to 15 years in prison.

=== 't Bildt and the rest of Friesland ===
Consultations about the possibility of striking had already taken place in 't Bildt on Thursday evening. The strike began on Friday morning, with men cycling to neighboring villages to hasten the outbreak of the strike, buses being stopped, shops being closed, and farm workers being taken off the land. Resistance centered around the town of Sint Jacobiparochie and only ended after a robbery car drove into the village on Thursday 6 May. The milk strike continued for a long time by farmers in the rest of Friesland, despite the pressure exerted on them. In Suameer, a farmer was shot dead because he refused to stop striking.

=== Other provinces ===
In The Hague, 400 women from the Postcheque and Giro service went on strike, led by 25 women from the typing room. In Rotterdam, a dozen women from the telephone office also went on strike, mainly because they distributed the strike messages and learned firsthand about the situation in other parts of the country.

== The role of Radio Oranje ==
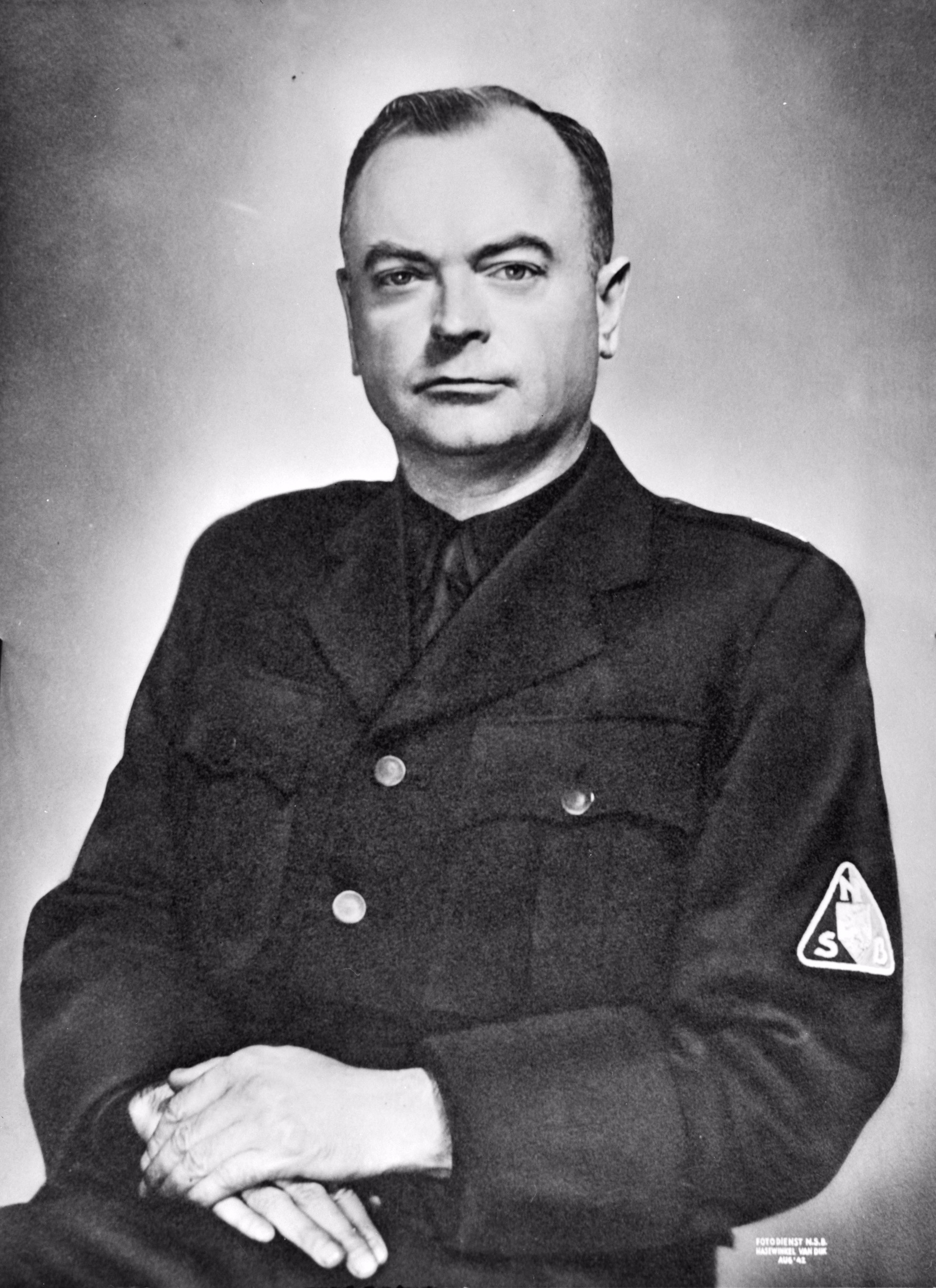
Anton Mussert

Due to a delay in communication, the London government did not become fully aware of the strikes in the Netherlands until later on. This was partly due to the government's focus on celebrating Princess Juliana's birthday at the time. The delay caused confusion among listeners and led to bitterness towards the government's response to the strikes. For a long time the government was unaware of the reason for the strike and did not know the scope of commander Christiansen's decision. It was not until Sunday afternoon, May 2, that the London government learned of the strike activity by an illegal telegram. Although this did not come as a complete surprise because in London they had heard Anton Mussert on the radio, on May first, referring to the "irrationalities". That Monday morning, the Council of Ministers of Prime Minister Gerbrandy met and Churchill told them that there was no allied military aid available to support a popular uprising, nor did they want to call for an end to the strike. They eventually called for no armed resistance. The reaction of the government over the previous days left listeners bitter; it was hard to accept that the voices of London had remained silent about the first mass popular resistance during the most critical moments of the occupation years.

A year later, in 1944, Radio Oranje commemorated the April-May strikes.

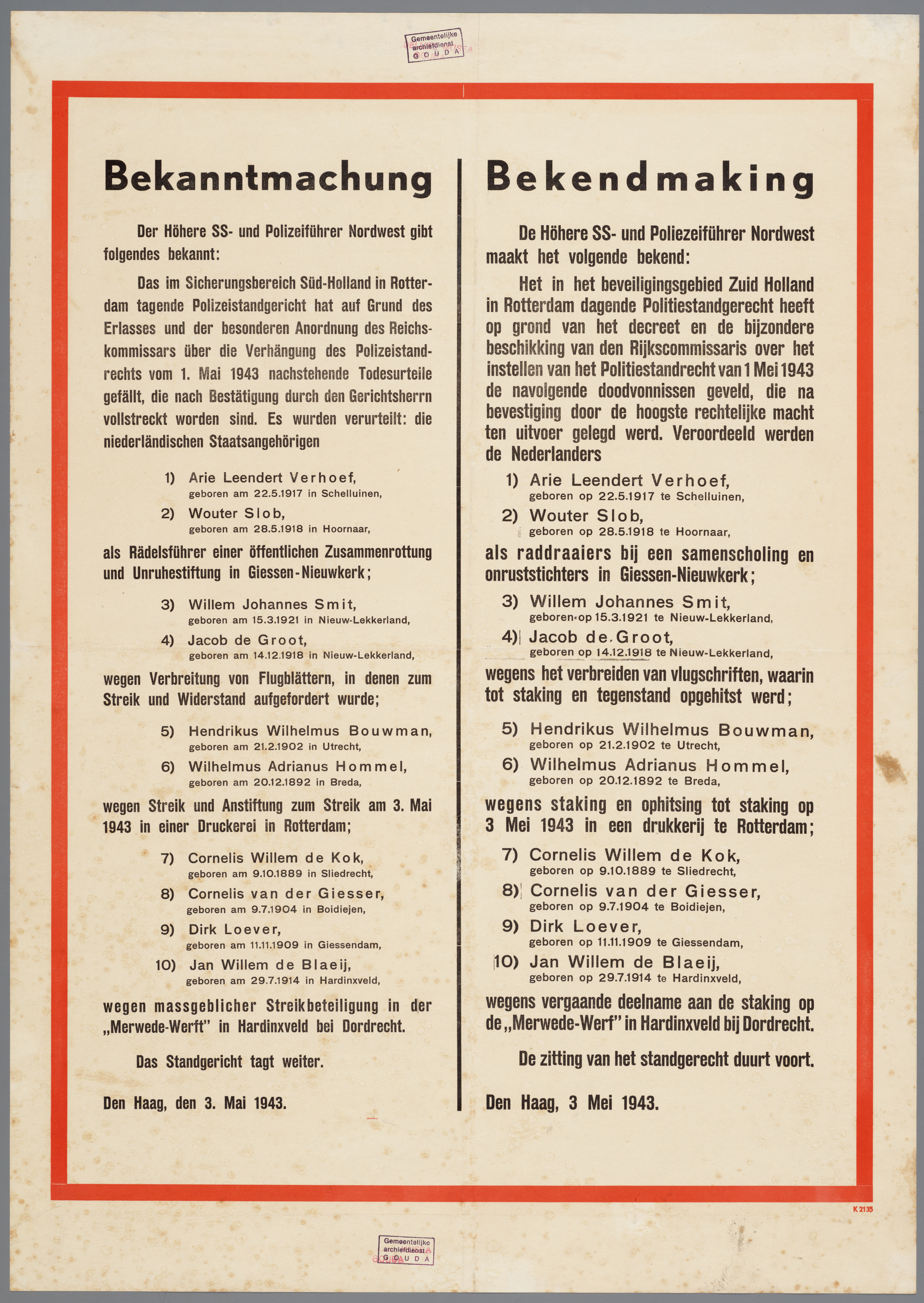
Announcement by the Höhere-SS und Polizeiführer of the names of those put to death in connection with illegal actions (April-May strikes), May 1943

== Retribution by the Germans ==
The German occupiers reacted to the strike with a heavy hand. Eighty strikers stood trial by execution, with their names announced on billboards. In addition, 95 people were killed and 400 seriously injured when the occupying forces fired on the strikers. After and during the strike, two hundred people were killed as a result of summary executions and exhaustion in penal camps. Because of the role of the Stork factory, engineer Frederik Marinus Loep was sentenced to death. Loep was not present in Hengelo when the strikes started. He was executed on 4 May in the forest of Twickelse. His body was never found.

== Monuments ==
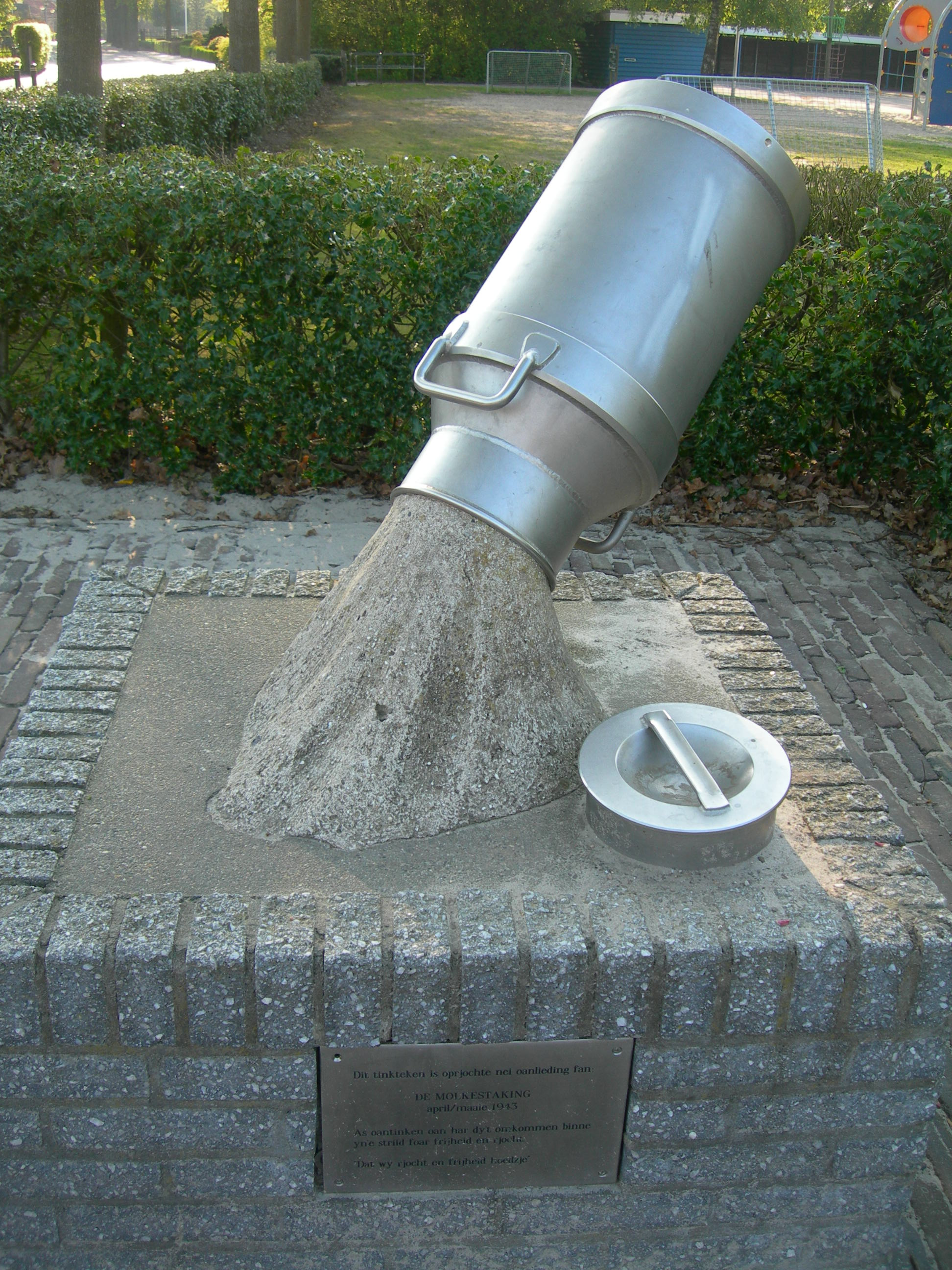
Milk Strike Monument, Sumar

- Monument at the N.H. Church in Marum
- Milk Strike Monument, Sumar
- Monument Appelbergen, Haren
- War Memorial in Vaassen
- Monument at railway station Hengelo (Overijssel)
