= Weerbaarheidsafdeling =

Organization

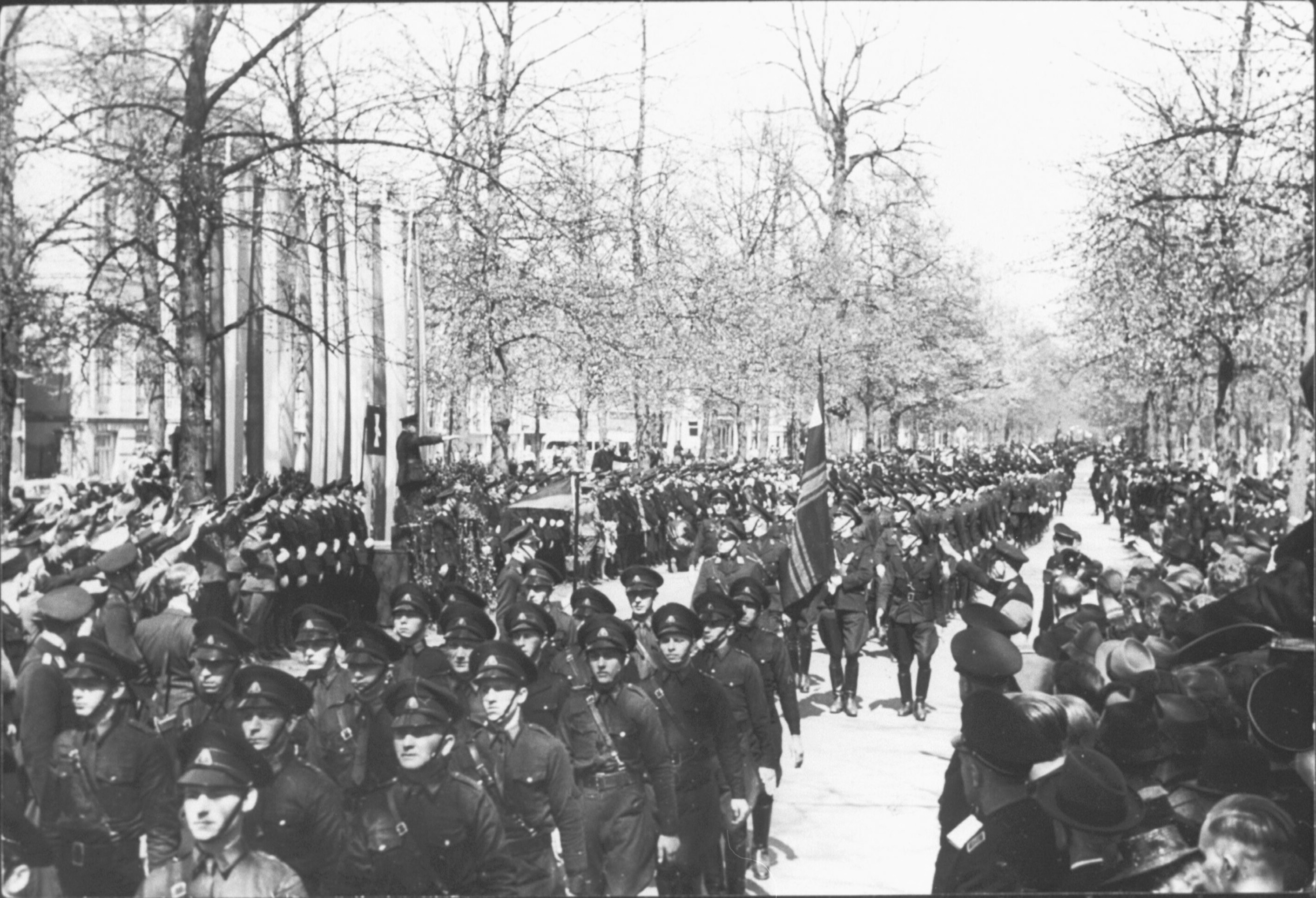
WA march on the occasion of Anton Mussert's birthday, May 11, 1941.

The Weerbaarheidsafdeling (WA; "Resilience Department") was the paramilitary arm of the National Socialist Movement in the Netherlands (NSB), the fascist political party that collaborated with the German occupiers of the Netherlands during World War II. The organization, roughly equivalent to the German SA, was founded in 1932 by Anton Mussert, co-founder of the NSB in 1931 and its leader until the end of the war. Members wore and marched in black uniforms and were thus called "blackshirts". In 1933 the Dutch government banned the wearing of uniforms (by civilians), and the WA was disbanded in 1935 in order to forestall the Dutch government's banning it. In 1940, after the German invasion, the WA became openly active again, and more ruthless than before. They specialized in violent attacks, particularly on the Dutch Jewish population.

== Occupation ==
After the occupation, the WA was put to use in much the same way as the SA was, forcing owners of restaurants and cafes to put up signs saying Jooden niet gewenscht ("Jews not welcome") and harassing and provoking inhabitants of neighbourhoods with many Jewish inhabitants. This led to the formation of "knokploegen", informal militias, and fights erupting between the WA and Jewish and non-Jewish inhabitants. On 9 February 1941 there were riots on the Rembrandtplein between the WA and Jewish youngsters. On 11 February a group of 40 to 50 WA members marched through Amsterdam to the Waterlooplein in the heart of the Jewish neighbourhood. This led to a pitched battle with Jewish and inhabitants of the Jordaan in which WA member Koot was severely injured. He died a few days later; he was buried with great pomp, and stylized a martyr, in much the same way as Horst Wessel in Nazi Germany. The events led to the first razzias, deportations of Jews and formation of a ghetto in Amsterdam, and from there to the February strike.

== Ranks and insignia ==
Collar insignia	Shoulder insignia	Ranks
		Commandant
		Opperheerbanleider
		Heerbanleider
		Opperbanleider
		Banleider
		Onderbanleider
		Opperhopman
		Hopman
		Opperkompaan
		Kompaan
		Vaandrig
		Opperwachtmeester
		Wachtmeester
		Konstabel
		Weerman

=== W.A. Uniform insignia from Distinctieven der Beweging ===
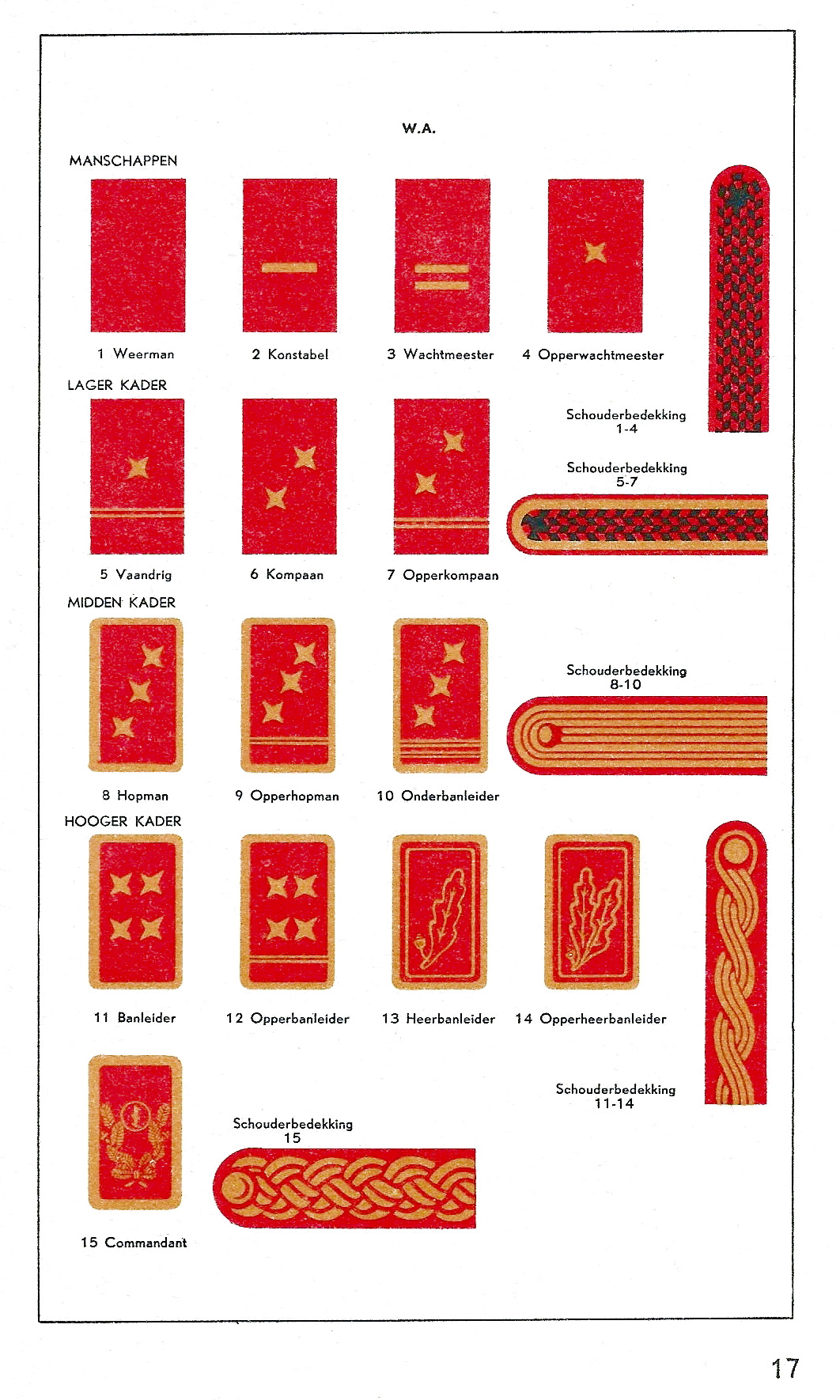

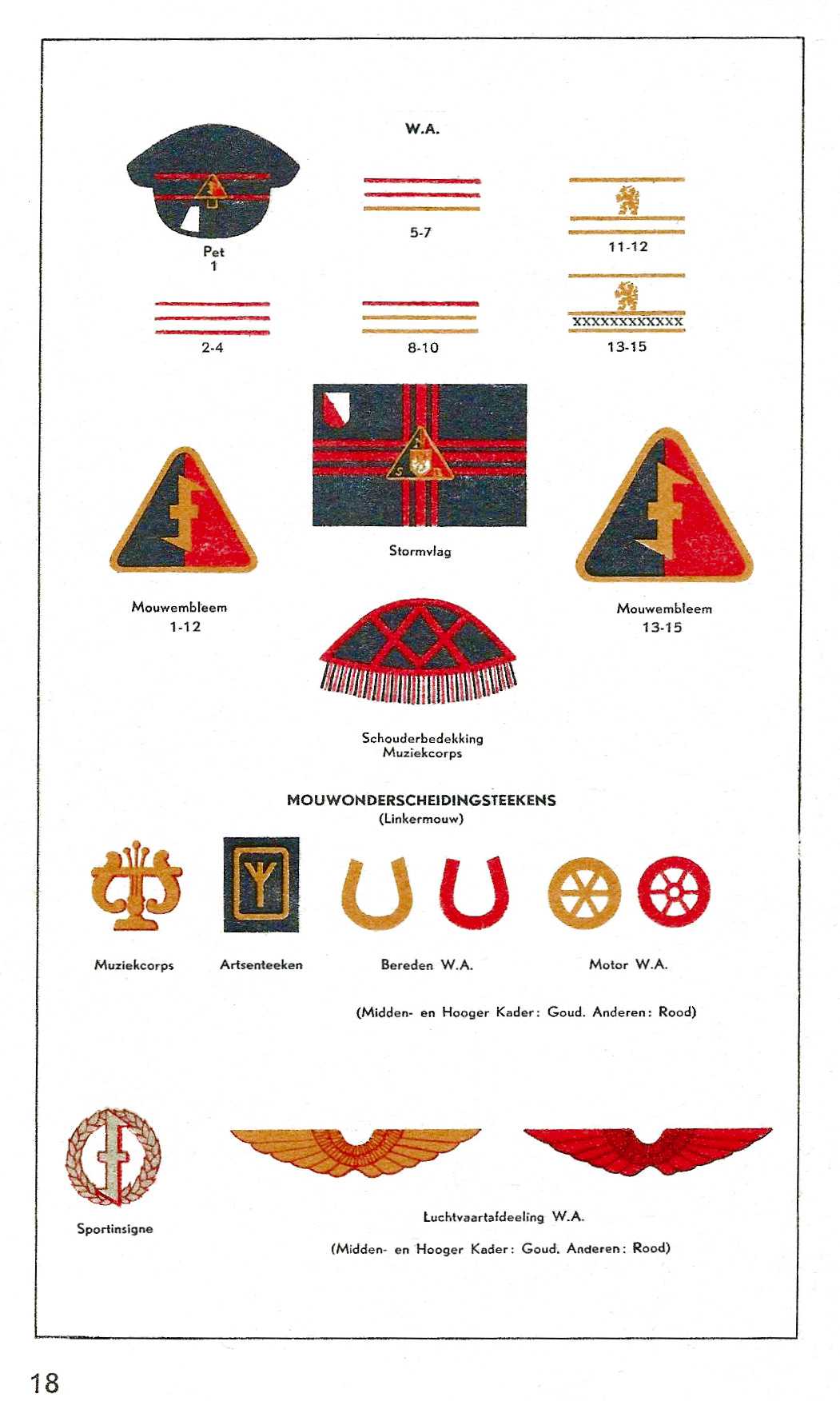

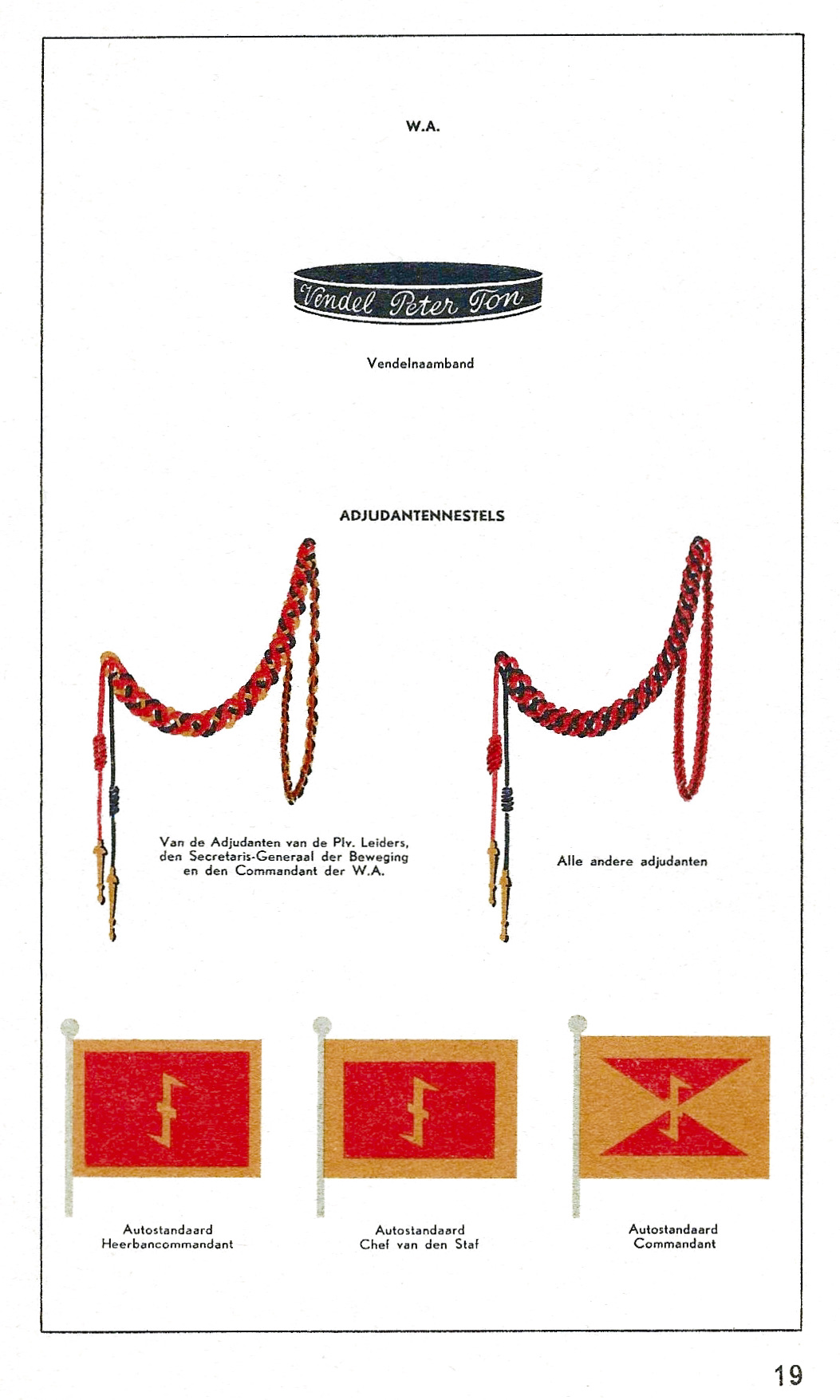
