= Émilienne Mopty =

French Anti-Nazi

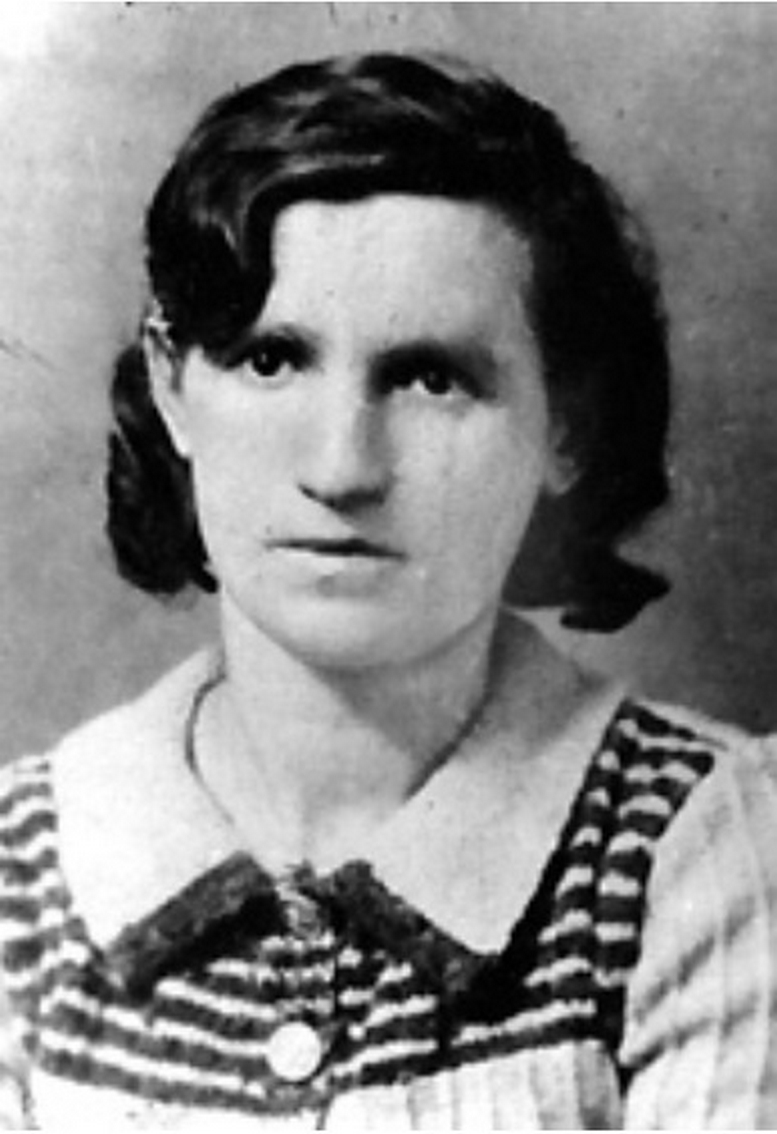
- Born: Émilienne Marie Wantiez; 29 October 1907; Harnes, Pas-de-Calais, French Third Republic
- Died: 18 January 1943 (aged 35); Cologne, Gau Cologne-Aachen, Nazi Germany
- Cause of death: Decapitated
- Occupation: Domestic worker
- Era: Long nineteenth century
- Movement: Communism
- Criminal penalty: Execution
- Spouse: Adrien Mopty
- Children: 3
- Parents: Émile Beudot (father); Marie Catherine Dedourges (mother)
- World War II
- Allegiance: Third International
- Branch: National Front
- Service years: 1941–1942
- Unit: FTP
- Battle: French Resistance
- Awards: Resistance Medal

Émilienne Mopty was a communist militant who organised women during the 1941 Nord-Pas-de-Calais miners' strike in Picardy. As a result of her activities she was executed by the Nazis.

== Biography ==
Mopty was born on 29 October 1907 in Harnes. Although she took the surname of her mother's husband, a miner named Anatole-François Wantiez, she is believed to be the daughter of Émile Beudot, the partner of her mother Marie Catherine Dedourges, having left her husband. During World War I she was evacuated to Belgium in 1917, and then from there to Évian-les-Bains. In 1925 she married Adrien Mopty, a miner from Montigny-en-Gohelle. At the time of her marriage, her profession was listed as being a domestic worker. The couple settled in her husband's hometown, where they raised three children. During major strikes in 1933 and 1934 she was a prominent activist, persuading yellow workers from returning to work.

=== WWII ===
Following the Fall of France, and the country's subsequent occupation by Nazi Germany, a miners' strike was organised in Northern France. On 29 May 1941, Mopty led a demonstration of women to the district offices in Hénin-Liétard. Initially arrested by the police for her involvement in direct action during the strikes, she was released due to a lack of evidence tying her to the Resistance. Mopty was then re-arrested by the gendarmerie in May 1942 but managed to escape, to work as a liaison operative for the Francs-Tireurs et Partisans (FTP).

Mopty was eventually recaptured at the end of 1942 in Arras. She was sentenced to death and transferred to Cologne prison, where she was mutilated and then beheaded.

== Legacy ==
In the twenty-first century, figures on the French left have paid tribute to Mopty including Jean-Luc Mélenchon and Michelle Demessine who, in a public speech in 2012, described her as a symbol of working-class women's resistance to Nazism.

In 2024, Mopyy's great-great-grandson authored a biography of her based on five letters she had written to her children in 1942 whilst imprisoned by the Nazis.
