= Émilienne de Sère =

French singer and stage actress

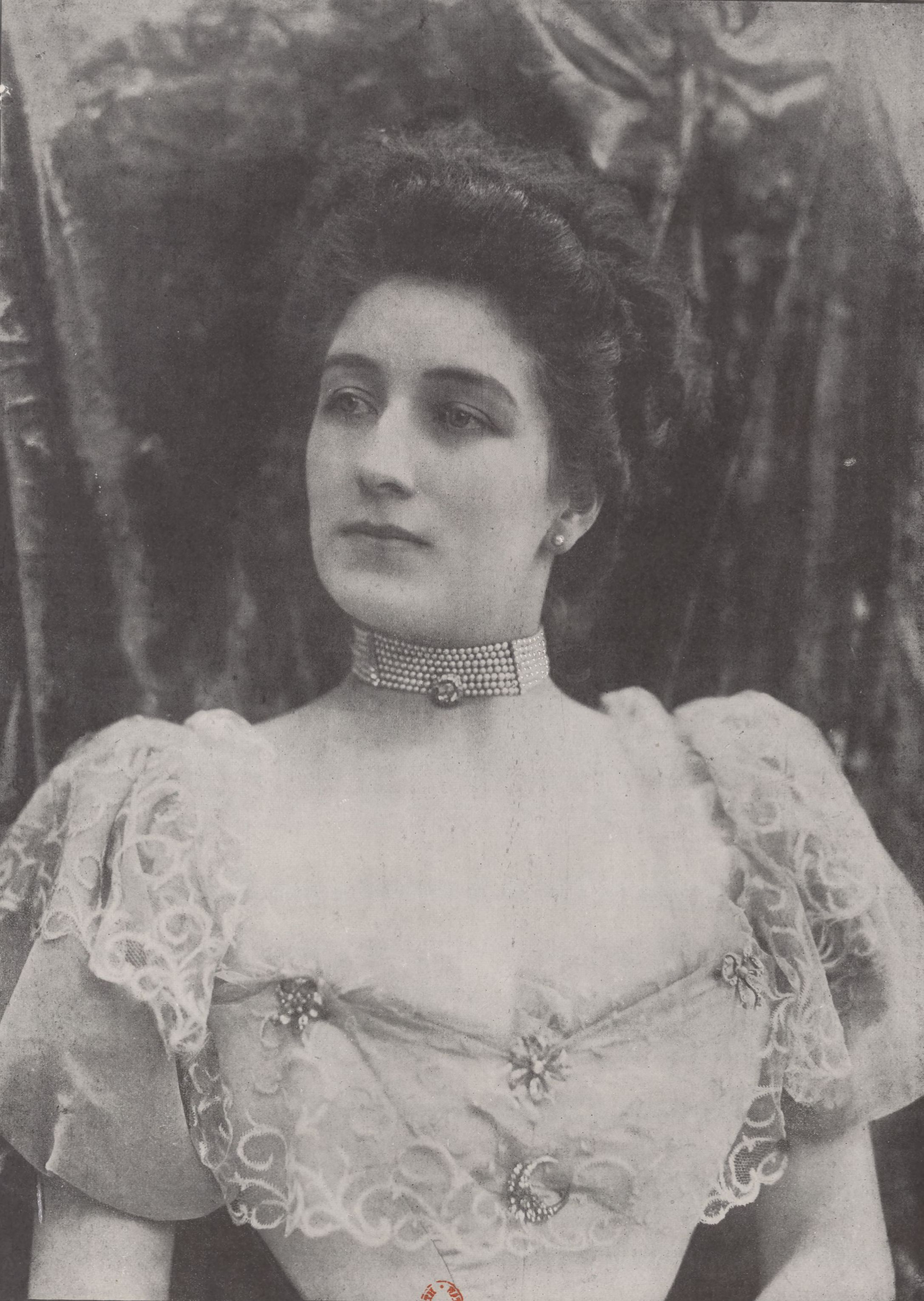
Émilienne de Sère. Photograph published in Le Mondain supplement of 30 March 1895.

Émilienne de Sère was a French operetta and café-concert singer active from 1894 to 1904.

== Life ==
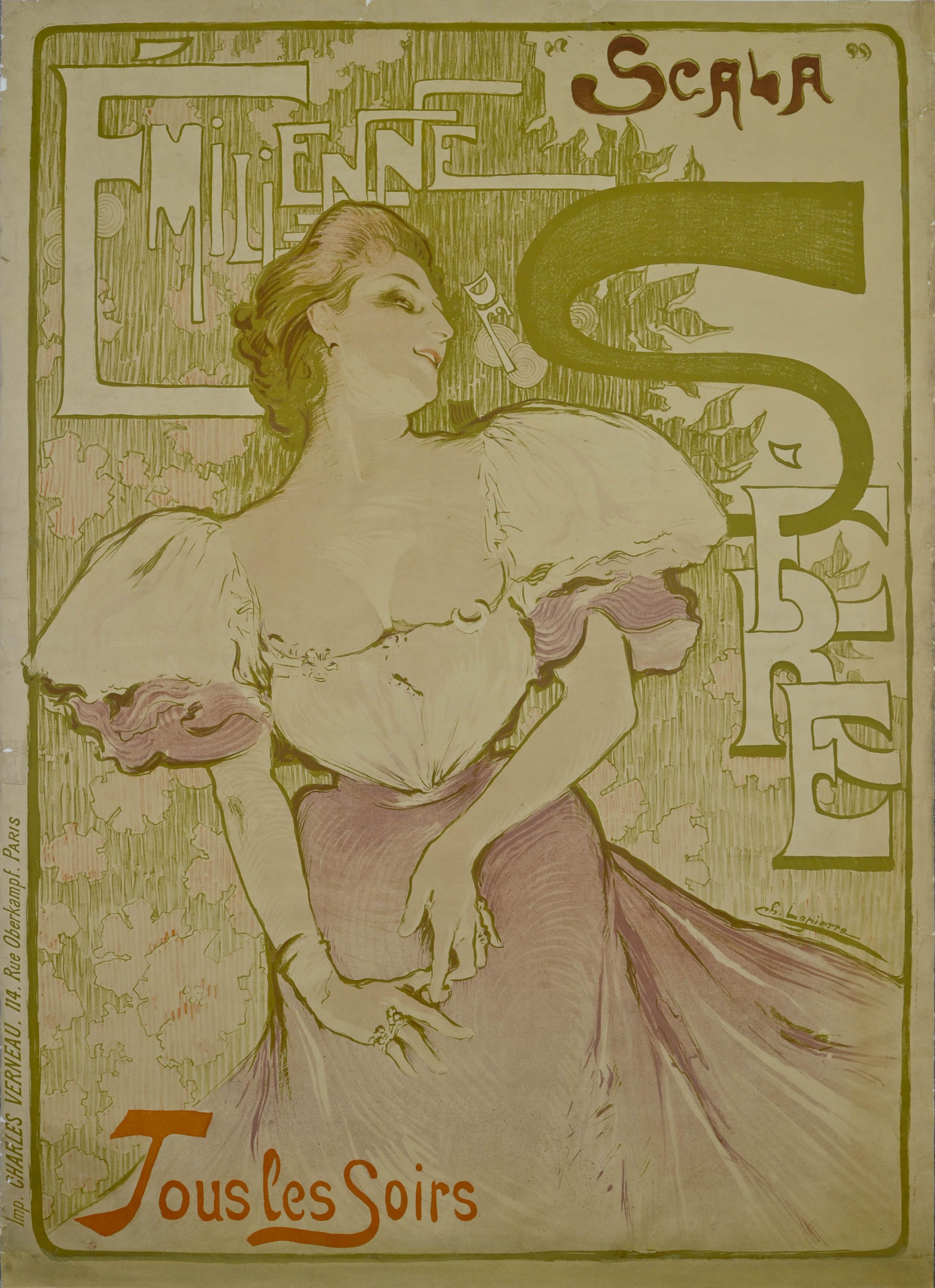
Émilienne de Sére, la Scala

Sère made her debut at the Menus-Plaisirs in the revue Que d'eau ! Que d'eau ! She then moved on to various other stages and sang in Parisian salons. She entered the Théâtre-Moderne, from where she left for Bucharest, where she was offered a favourable engagement. On her return, she stayed away from the theatre. Édouard Marchand hired her for the Trouville-sur-Mer Casino season, and the Scala (Paris) in 1895.

She sang at the Casino de Paris in 1898 and created the role of Thaïs in the bouffe fantasy Othello chez Thaïs at the Bouffes de Bordeaux the same year.

She performed at the Alcazar de Bruxelles (Note: Alcazar royal or Fantaisies-Parisiennes) and at the Salone Margherita (Napoli) in Naples in 1899, at the Театр Омона in Moscow in 1900 at the Alcazar of Marseille in 1901 in Roma in Naples at the Kursaal or "Nouveau-Théâtre" in Geneva at the Palace Theatre, London in 1902, then in Düsseldorf, Berlin and Vienna and at the Central-Theatre in Leipzig in 1903.

She led the revue Bruxelles ! tout le monde… monte, at the Cirque Royal in Brussels for 3 months in 1904. She performed again at the London Palace Theatre in 1904.
