= Nord-Pas-de-Calais =

Former administrative region of France

Nord-Pas-de-Calais Nord-Pas-Calés (Picard) Nôord-Nauw van Kales (West Flemish)
- Region of France
- Flag Coat of arms

- Coordinates: 50°28′N 2°43′E
- Country: France
- Dissolved: 1 January 2016
- Prefecture: Lille
- Departments: 2: Nord (59); Pas-de-Calais (62)

Government
  - Body: Regional Council of Nord-Pas-de-Calais
  - President: Xavier Bertrand (DVD)

Area
  - Total: 12,414 km^{2} (4,793 sq mi)

Population (2012-01-01)
  - Total: 4,050,706
  - Density: 326.30/km^{2} (845.12/sq mi)

GDP
  - Total: €136.523 billion (2024)
  - Per capita: €33,585 (2024)
- Time zone: UTC+1 (CET)
  - Summer (DST): UTC+2 (CEST)
- ISO 3166 code: FR-O
- NUTS Region: FR3
- Website: www.nordpasdecalais.fr

Nord-Pas-de-Calais (French pronunciation: [nɔʁ pɑ d(ə) kalɛ]; Picard: Nord-Pas-Calés; West Flemish: Nôord-Nauw van Kales) is a former administrative region of France. Since 1 January 2016, it has been part of the new region Hauts-de-France. It consisted of the departments of Nord and Pas-de-Calais. Nord-Pas-de-Calais bordered the English Channel (west), the North Sea (northwest), Belgium (north and east), and Picardy (south). Until the 17th century, the history of the North was largely shared with the history of Belgium (the Celtic Belgians during Antiquity were a multitude of Celtic peoples from the north of Gaul), that of a land that "for almost a thousand years served as a battlefield for all of Europe."

The majority of the region was once part of the historical Southern Netherlands, but gradually became part of France between 1477 and 1678, particularly during the reign of King Louis XIV. The historical French provinces that preceded Nord-Pas-de-Calais are Artois, French Flanders, French Hainaut, and (partially) Picardy (part of Hainaut and Flanders is in the Kingdom of Belgium). These provincial designations are still frequently used by the inhabitants. The former administrative region was created in 1956 under the name "Nord" and maintained that name until 1972, when "Pas-de-Calais" was added. This remained unchanged until its dissolution in 2016.

With a population density of 330.8 people per km^{2} on just over 12,414 km^{2}, it was a densely populated region inhabited by 4.1 million people, 7% of France's total population, making it the fourth most populous region in the country; 83% of the population lived in urban communities. Its administrative centre and largest city was Lille. The second largest city is Calais, which served as a major continental economic/transportation hub with Dover of Great Britain 42 kilometres (26 mi) away; this made Nord-Pas-de-Calais the closest continental European connection to the island of Great Britain. Other major towns included Valenciennes, Lens, Douai, Béthune, Dunkirk, Maubeuge, Boulogne, Arras, Cambrai, and Saint-Omer. The region is featured in numerous films, including Bienvenue chez les Ch'tis.

== Name ==
Nord-Pas-de-Calais combines the names of the constituent departments of Nord (literally 'North', the northernmost department of France) and Pas-de-Calais ('Strait of Calais', the French name of the Strait of Dover). The regional council, however, spells the name Nord-Pas-de-Calais.

The northern part of the region was historically a part of the County of Flanders, with Lille as its capital. Those who wish to highlight the historical links the region has with Belgium and the Netherlands prefer to call this region the French Low Countries, which also means French Netherlands in French (French: Pays-Bas français; Dutch: Franse Nederlanden or Franse Lage Landen). Other alternative names are Région Flandre(s)-Artois, Hauts-de-France, ('Upper France') and Picardie-du-Nord ('Northern Picardy').

== History ==
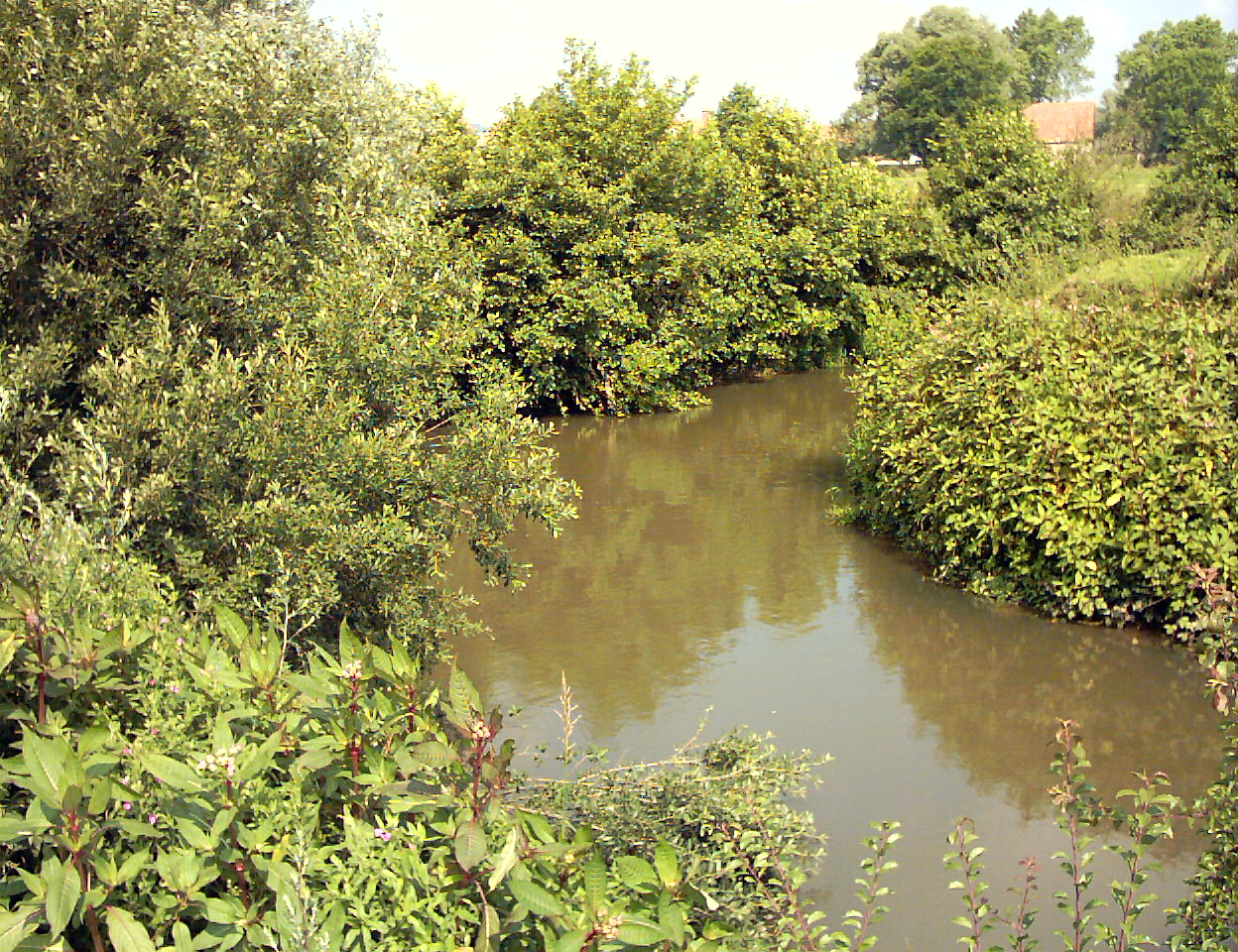
Liane in Pas-de-Calais

Inhabited since prehistoric times, the Nord-Pas-de-Calais region has always been a strategic (and hence a highly fought-over) region in Europe. French President Charles de Gaulle, who was born in Lille, called the region a "fatal avenue" through which invading armies repeatedly passed. Over the centuries, it was conquered in turn by the Celtic Belgae, the Romans, the Germanic Franks, England, the Spanish and Austrian Netherlands, and the Dutch Republic. After the final French annexation in the early 18th century, much of the region was again occupied by Germany during the First and Second World Wars.

During the 4th and 5th centuries, the Roman practice of co-opting Germanic tribes to provide military and defense services along the route from Boulogne to Cologne created a Germanic–Romance linguistic border in the region that persisted until the 8th century. By the 9th century, most inhabitants north of Lille spoke a dialect of Middle Dutch, while the inhabitants to the south spoke a variety of Romance dialects. This linguistic border is still evident today in the place names of the region. Beginning in the 9th century, the linguistic border began a steady move to the north and the east. By the end of the 13th century, the linguistic border had shifted to the river Lys in the south and Cap Gris-Nez in the west.

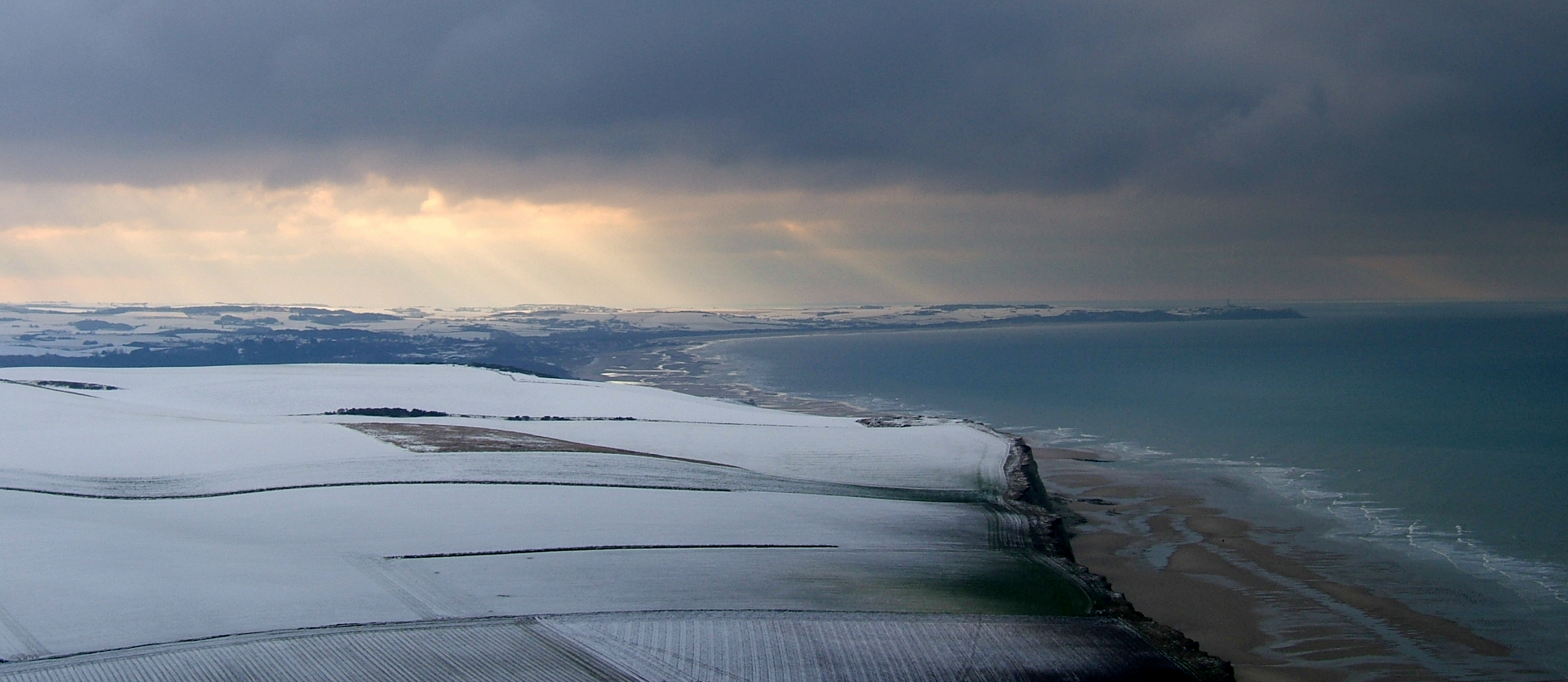
Winter at Cap Blanc Nez

During the Middle Ages, the Pas-de-Calais department comprised the County of Boulogne and the County of Artois, while the Nord department was mostly made up of the southern portions of the County of Flanders and the County of Hainaut. Boulogne, Artois, and Flanders were fiefs of the French crown, while Hainaut and (after 1493) Flanders were within the Holy Roman Empire. Calais was an English possession from 1347 to 1558, when it was recovered by the French throne. In the 15th century, all of the territories, except Calais, were united under the rule of the Dukes of Burgundy, along with other territories in northern France and areas in what is now Belgium, Luxembourg, and the Netherlands. With the death of the Burgundian duke Charles the Bold in 1477, the Boulonnais and Artois were seized by the French crown, while Flanders and Hainaut were inherited by Charles's daughter Marie. Shortly thereafter, in 1492, Artois was ceded back to Marie's son Philip the Handsome, as part of an attempt to keep Philip's father, Emperor Maximilian I, neutral in French King Charles VIII's prospective invasion of Italy.

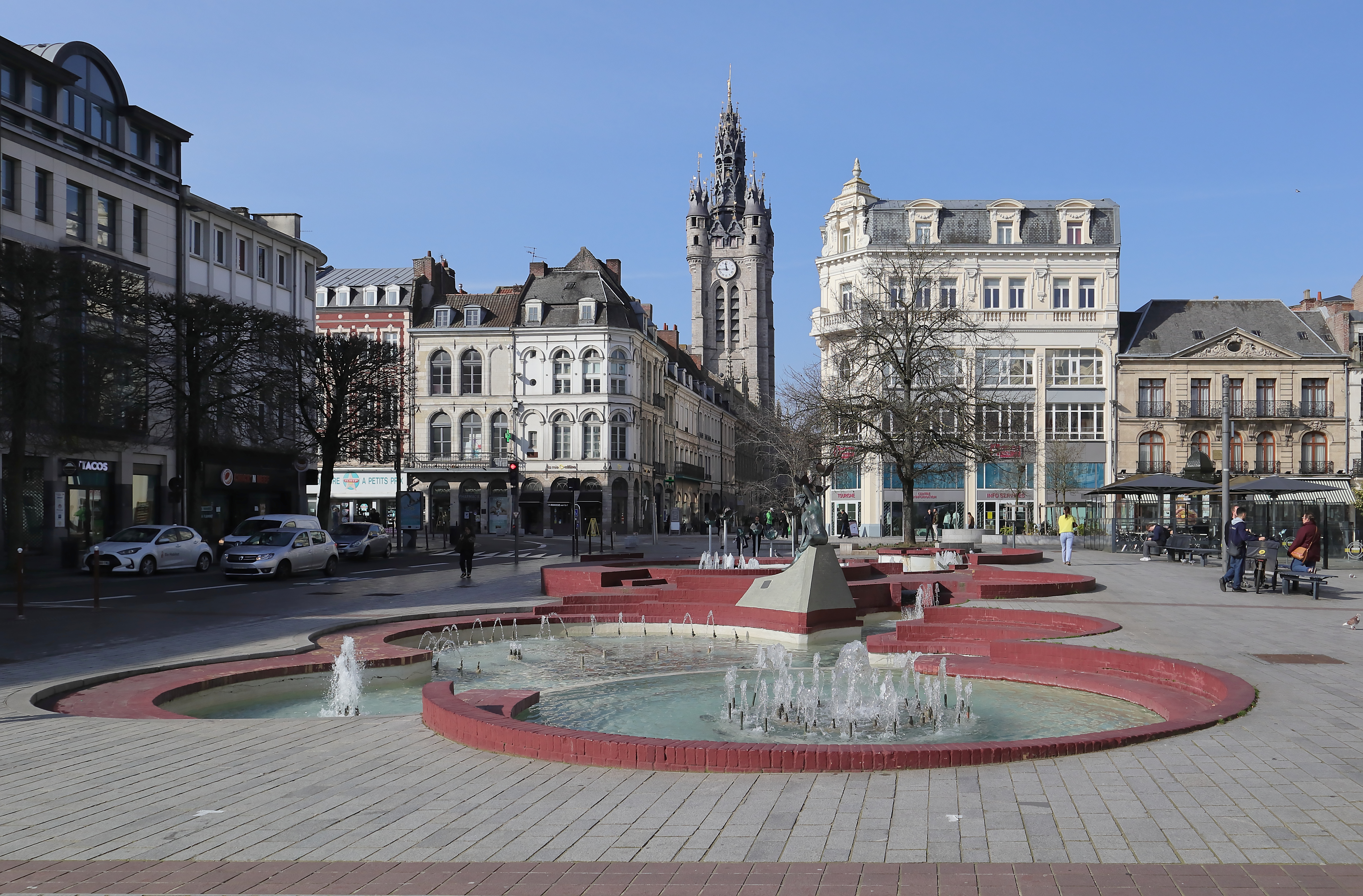
Douai

Thus, most of the territories of what is now Nord-Pas-de-Calais were reunited with the Burgundian inheritance, which had passed through Marie's marriage to the House of Habsburg. These territories formed an integral part of the Seventeen Provinces of the Netherlands as they were defined during the reign of Philip's son, Emperor Charles V, and passed to Charles's son, Philip II of Spain. During the Italian Wars, much of the conflict between France and Spain occurred in the region. When the Netherlands revolted against Spanish rule, beginning in 1566, the territories in what is now Nord-Pas-de-Calais were those most loyal to the throne and proved the base from which the Duke of Parma was able to bring the whole southern part of the Netherlands back under Spanish control. It was also a base for Spanish support of French Catholics in the French Wars of Religion.

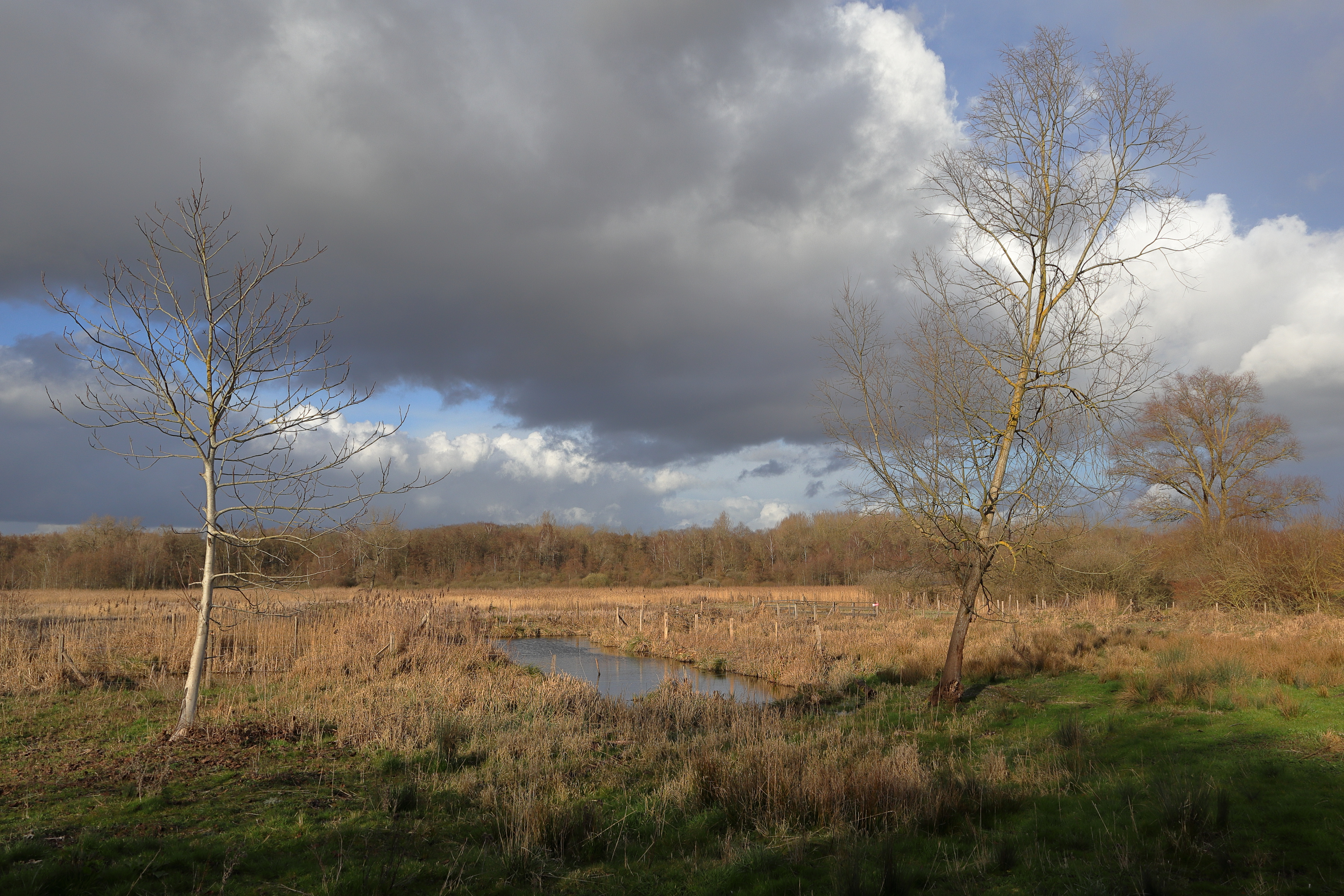
Bog of Vred, natural reserve

During the wars between France and Spain in the 17th century (1635–1659, 1667–1668, 1672–1678, 1688–1697), these territories became the principal seat of conflict between the two states, and French control over the area was gradually established. Beginning with the annexation of Artois in 1659, most of the current Nord department territory had been acquired by the time of the Treaty of Nijmegen in 1678. The current borders were mostly established by the time of the Treaty of Ryswick in 1697.

The area, previously divided among the French provinces of Flanders, Artois, and Picardy, was divided into its two present departments following the French Revolution of 1789. Under Napoleon, the French boundary was extended to include all of Flanders and present-day Belgium until the Congress of Vienna in 1815 restored the original French boundary.

During the 19th century, the region underwent major industrialisation and became one of the leading industrial regions of France, second only to Alsace-Lorraine. Nord-Pas-de-Calais was barely touched by the Franco-Prussian War of 1870; the war actually helped it to cement its leading role in French industry due to the loss of Alsace-Lorraine to Germany. However, it suffered catastrophic damage in the two World Wars of the 20th century.

=== Prehistory ===
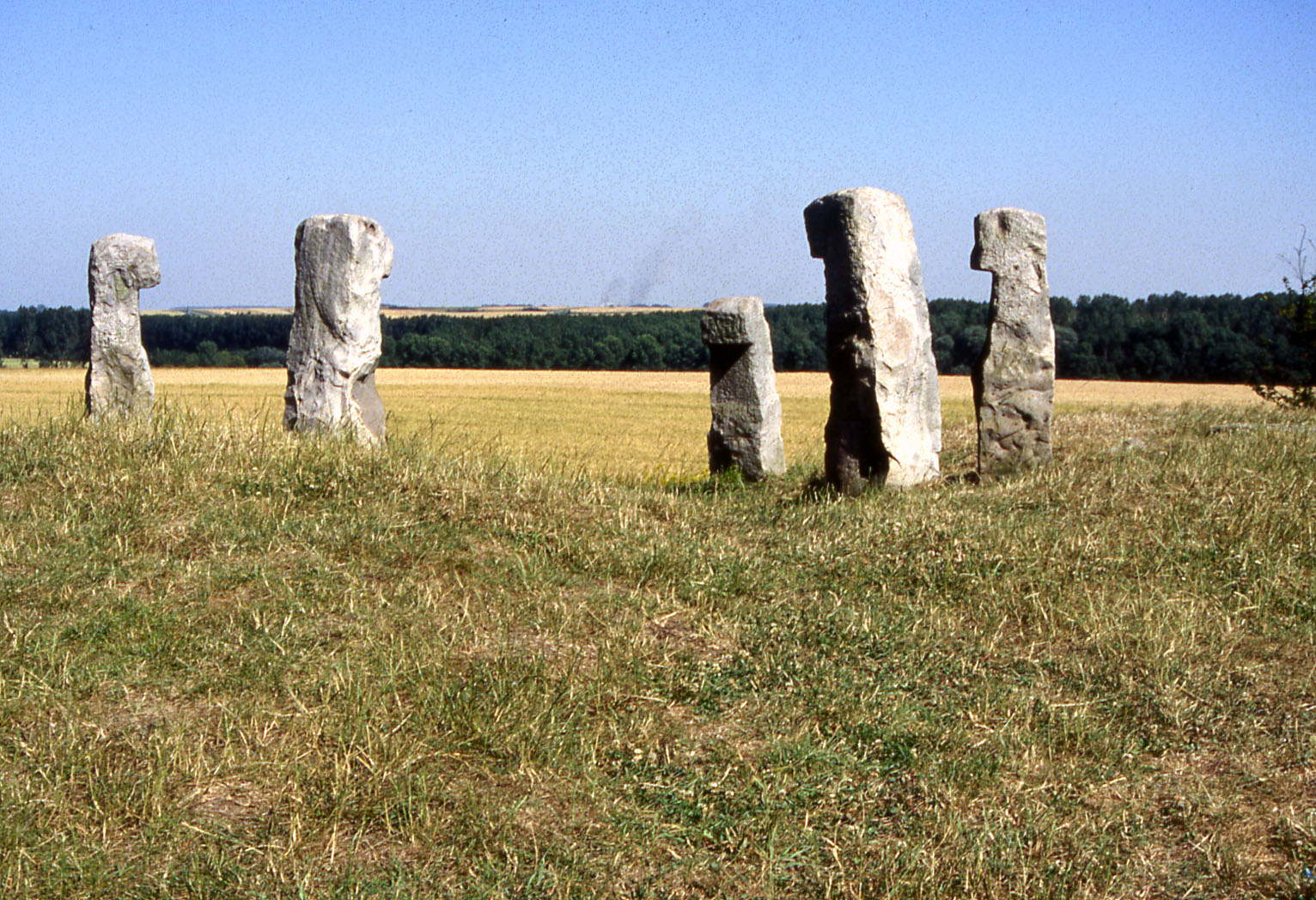
Cromlech des Bonettes, Sailly-en-Ostrevent

The earliest evidence of man's presence in the region dates from the Pleistocene to the Middle Ages. Evidence of early human presence includes bifaces dating back to around 700,000 BC found in Wimereux and 500,000 BC in Quiévy. During the Pleistocene, human activity was intermittent due to the harsh climate caused by expanding Nordic glaciers. Occupation sites are noted from around 60,000 BC in Marcoing and 50,000–40,000 BC in Busigny and Hamel, with the first Homo sapiens identified in Rouvroy.

After the last Ice age, the region, now covered in forests, saw the emergence of hunter-gatherer societies using microliths for hunting. The Neolithic period marked the beginning of agriculture and animal husbandry, influenced by the Cerny and Michelsberg cultures. Evidence of trade and tool use from outside the region highlights interactions with other areas. Additionally, the Neolithic era left behind megalithic structures, such as dolmens and menhirs, which were likely used for religious purposes, though their exact functions remain unclear.

=== Gallia Belgica and the Roman Empire ===
==== The Gallic War ====
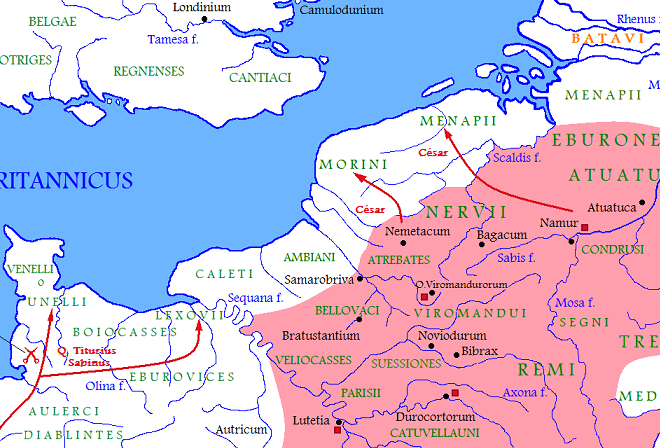
The Gallic War in 56 BC: After defeating the Atrebates and Nervians at the battle of Sabis, Caesar continued his conquests towards the North Sea.

During the Gallic War in 56 BC, Julius Caesar expanded his conquests toward the North Sea after defeating the Atrebates and Nervians at the Battle of Sabis. The Belgians, a collective of various tribes such as the Menapiens, Morins, Atrébates, and Nervians, had settled in the region between the 5th and 1st centuries BC. These tribes, described by Caesar, were not homogeneous and occupied different parts of the land. Settlements were mainly hamlets around farms, with few fortified camps like Etrun. The Roman invasion began in 57 BC, leading to significant battles, including a decisive one on the banks of the Sabis. Despite initial resistance, by 50 BC, Gaul-Belgium was conquered and remained under military occupation until 27 BC.

==== Pax Romana ====
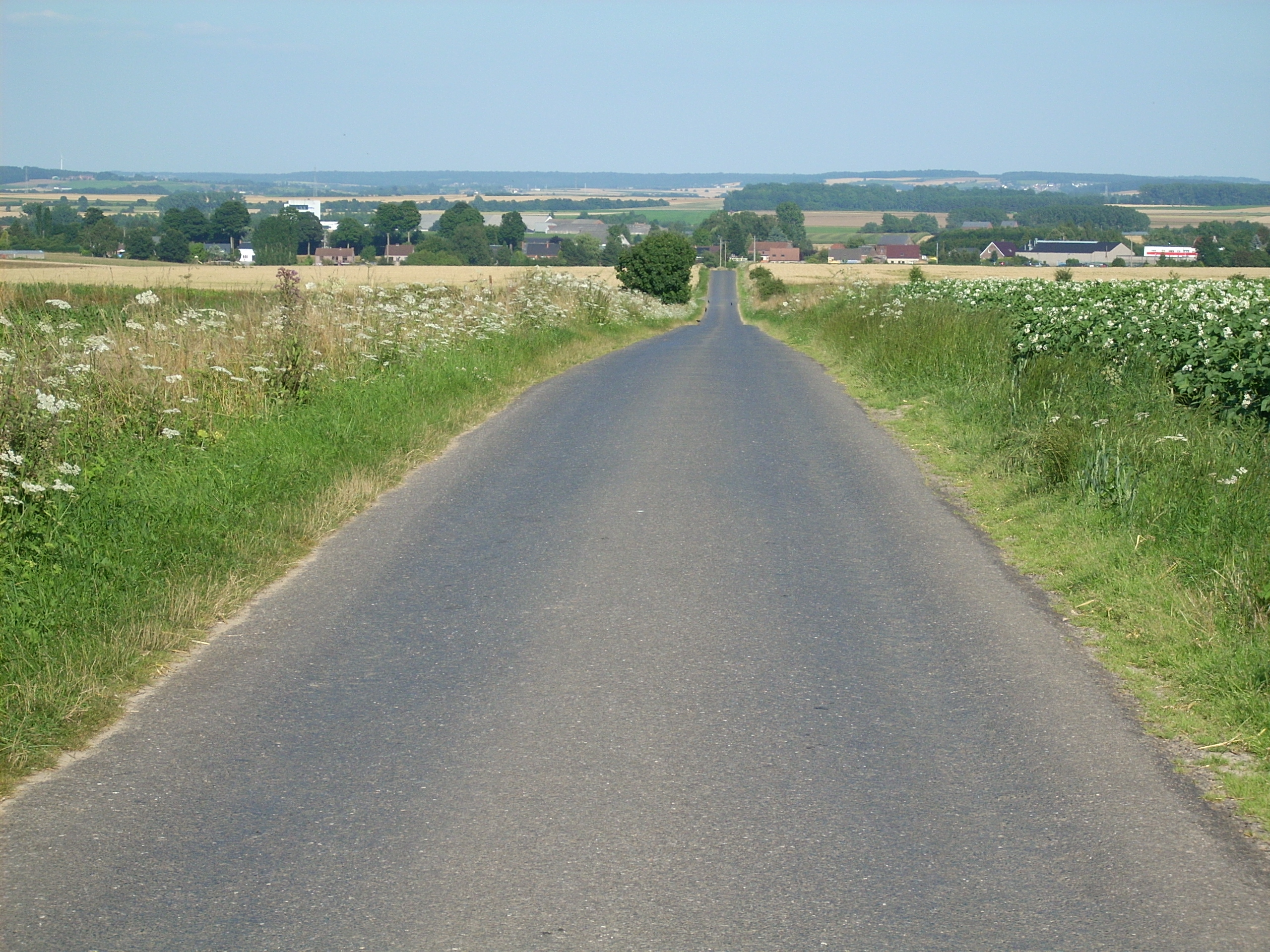
Roman road from Bavay to Trier, one of the seven "Chaussée Brunehaut" radiating out from Bavay (Bagacum Nerviorum)

Following their victory, the Romans implemented policies of pacification and Romanization, transforming the region administratively and economically. They established numerous cities, incorporating ancient Celtic tribes into the prosperous Roman province of Belgium. Key cities included Bagacum Nerviorum (Bavay), Namur (Aduatuca), Castellum Menapiorum (Cassel), Nemetocenna (Arras), and Tervanna (Thérouanne). The region flourished through agriculture, particularly sheep breeding and wheat cultivation, and the development of a sophisticated road network known as the "Brunehaut causeways". This network facilitated trade within the empire, allowing for the import and export of various goods, including ceramics, pottery, wine, olive oil, linen cloth, and ham. Vici (hamlets) emerged along these routes, and many modern communes in the Scarpe and Escaut valleys trace their origins to Gallo-Roman settlements.

==== Decline and barbarian invasions ====
By the end of the 1st century, Germanic tribes began encroaching on the region, leading to periods of pillaging and instability. The Franks crossed the Rhine in 253–254 and again between 259 and 263, followed by the Alamanni in 275. During brief periods of peace, new capitals like Tournai and Cambrai emerged, replacing older ones such as Cassel and Bavay. The region also saw the initial stages of Christianization, although it remained limited until the 3rd and 5th centuries. In 406, a frozen Rhine allowed a flood of barbarian groups, including the Franks and Germans driven by the Huns, to invade, ultimately leading to the collapse of the remaining Roman authority in the region.

=== The Frankish kingdoms ===
==== Christianization in the Merovingian period ====
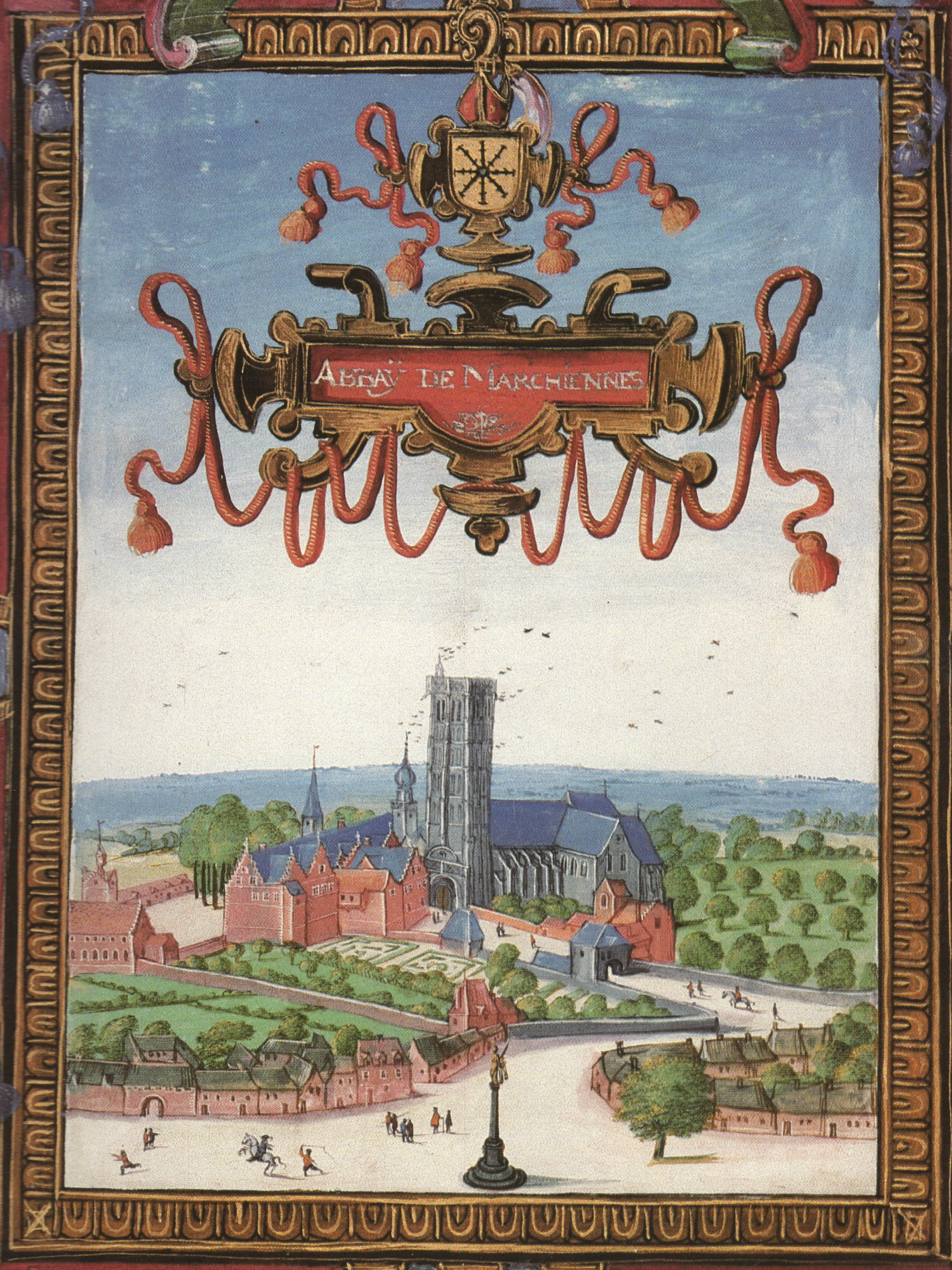
Marchiennes Abbey was founded around 630.

During the Merovingian period, the Salian Franks initially maintained their pagan beliefs, unlike other Germanic tribes who converted to Arianism. Clovis's conversion to Nicene Christianity was significant as it aligned with the remaining Roman Empire's religion, providing sacred legitimacy. This period saw a renewal of urbanization and the establishment of ecclesiastical authorities. Vaast became bishop of Arras and Cambrai early in the century. By 511, however, the region was not sufficiently Christianized to be represented at the Council of Orleans.

==== Between Neustria and Austrasia ====
The Merovingians did not have a concept of statehood; instead, fiefdoms were private domains. After Clovis's death, his kingdom was divided among his sons, leading to dynastic struggles, notably between queens Brunehaut and Frédégonde. Around 630 AD, during Dagobert's reign, significant Christianization efforts began with the establishment of numerous monasteries, such as Marchiennes, Condé, and Maroilles. These monasteries, supported by the Frankish aristocracy, played crucial roles in land development and extending royal power. Coastal areas saw less interest from the Franks, with the first bishop, Audomar (Saint Omer), arriving only in the 6th century.

=== The Scheldt as a new frontier ===
==== Treaty of Verdun ====
The Treaty of Verdun in 843 divided Charlemagne's empire into three kingdoms, establishing the Scheldt River as the natural boundary between West Francia and Middle Francia. This division split what is now the Nord département into two parts: one under what would become France and the other under the Holy Roman Empire. This new border marked a significant shift in territorial and political dynamics in the region.

==== Counties of Flanders, Cambrésis, and Hainaut ====
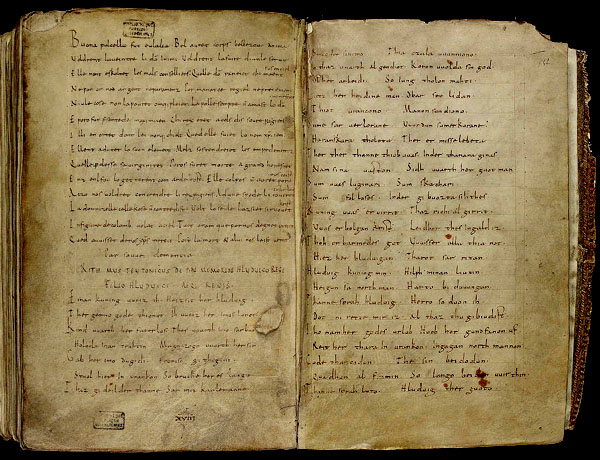
Sequence of Saint Eulalia

In the early Middle Ages, the feudal system shaped the region's political landscape. The County of Flanders emerged in the late 9th century as a semi-autonomous entity with regular insubordination to the French King. Similarly, the County of Hainaut took shape by the mid-11th century, with the Duchy of Brabant reflecting Flemish traditions. The influence of the Catholic Church also grew, with the Bishop of Cambrai becoming Count of Cambrésis. The importance of waterways led to the growth of towns such as Lille and Arras, which gained privileges and self-governance, especially in the 12th century when Arras became renowned for its cloth industry.

==== Battle of Bouvines ====
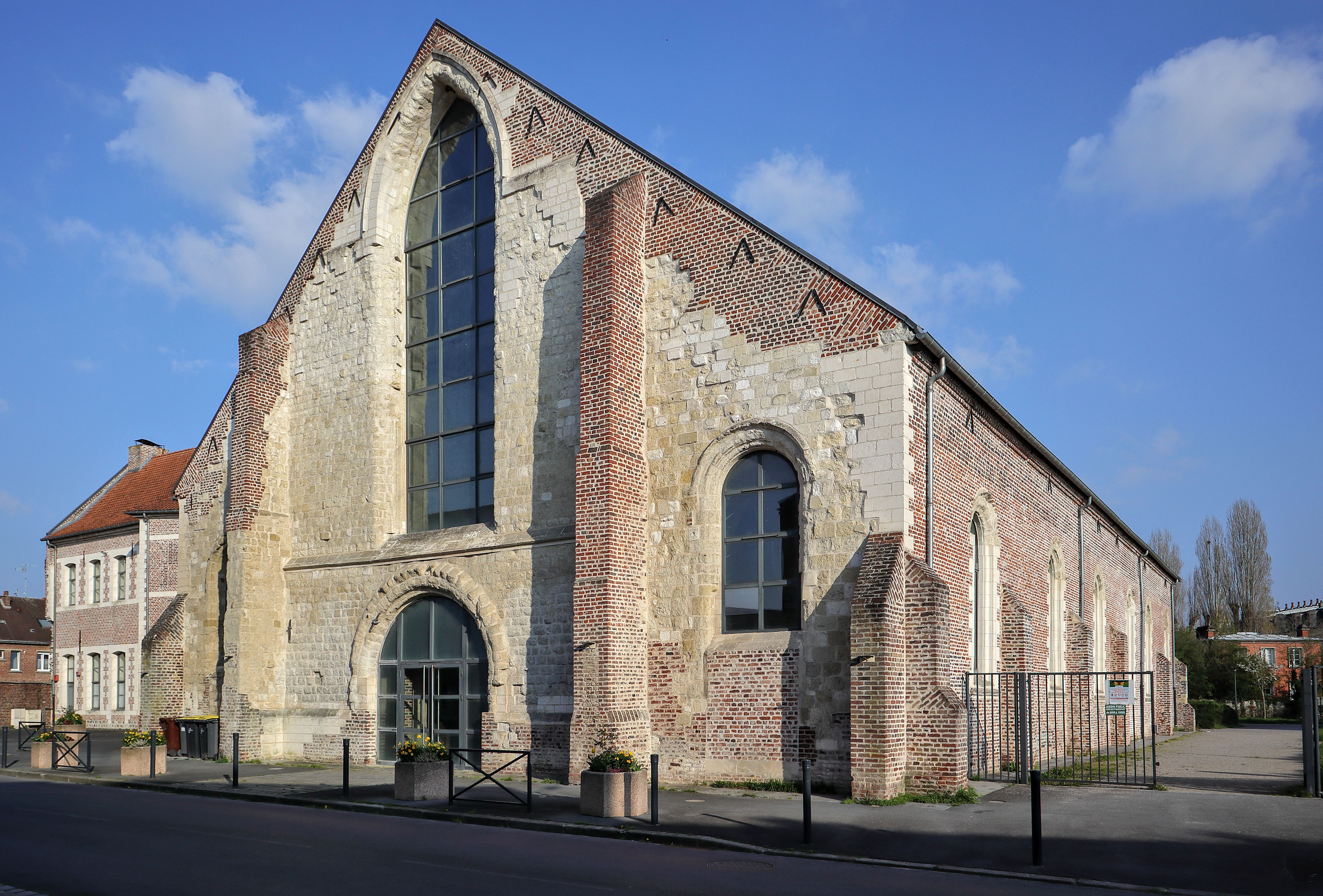
Recollect Convent of Cambrai Cambrai, created in the 13th century

In 1180, Isabelle de Hainaut's marriage to Philippe Auguste brought the Artois region to the French crown. The complex succession issues surrounding the County of Flanders led to a coalition against the King of France, involving the Emperor, the King of England, and the Count of Flanders, Ferrand of Portugal. The decisive Battle of Bouvines in 1214 saw Philippe Auguste emerge victorious, enabling him to implement administrative reforms to consolidate royal power. These changes, along with the support of his successor Saint Louis, allowed the French monarchy to exert influence over Flanders and Hainaut. The early 13th century also saw significant religious expansion in these regions with the establishment of monasteries and beguinages, fostering religious movements like Rheno-Flemish mysticism.

==== Hundred Years' War ====
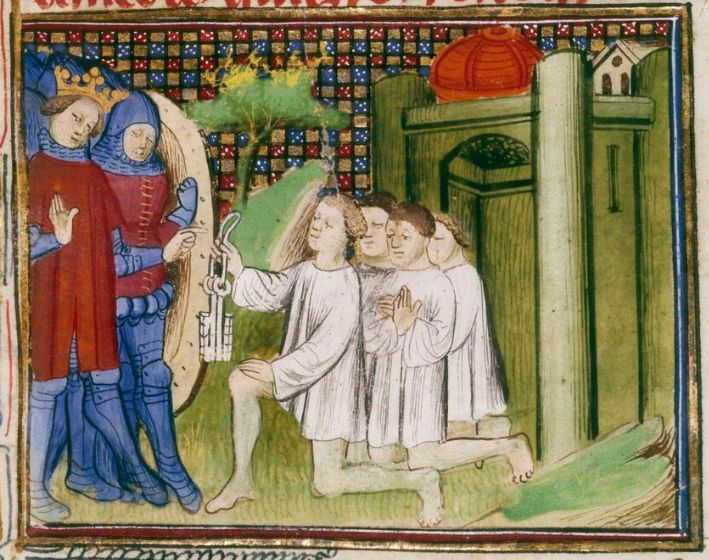
The surrender of Calais in 1347, Froissart's Chronicles

The 14th century brought the crisis of the late Middle Ages and rising tensions between France and England, particularly over Flanders, Guyenne, and Scotland. The Count of Flanders, though serving the French King, had economic ties with England, while the Count of Hainaut aligned with the Emperor, an English ally. Edward III's campaign in 1346 led to the protracted siege of Calais. The Hundred Years' War, while destructive, was overshadowed by devastating epidemics like the Black Death, which struck southern Hainaut in 1316, killing a third of the population, and reoccurred several times, including a severe outbreak in Calais in 1348.

=== From the Revolution to the First Empire ===
==== Context in 1789 ====
Northern France, described by Jean-Clément Martin as the "aborted Vendée", was notably hostile to the French Revolution. The local peasants, deeply affected by the king's execution in January 1793, resisted the new revolutionary order. Liberty trees were cut down in the Cambrai district, and parishioners refused sacraments from constitutional priests. In villages like Morbecque, peasants rebelled against conscription and faced persecution by the republican authorities.

==== Creation of the Nord and Pas-de-Calais départements ====
On September 29, 1789, the Constituent Assembly decided to reorganize France into departments of approximately 324 square leagues each. The northern provinces were to form four departments, but various projects clashed. Ultimately, the National Assembly decided in 1790 to create the Nord and Pas-de-Calais departments. Douai was initially chosen as the prefecture of Nord due to Merlin de Douai's influence, but it was later moved to Lille by the First Consul on 3 Thermidor IX. The Nord department consisted of eight districts: Bergues, Hazebrouck, Lille, Douai, Cambray, Valenciennes, Le Quesnoy, and Avesnes, while Pas-de-Calais comprised Arras, Bapaume, Béthune, Boulogne, Calais, Montreuil, Saint-Omer, and Saint-Pol.

==== Franco-Austrian War and the First Empire ====
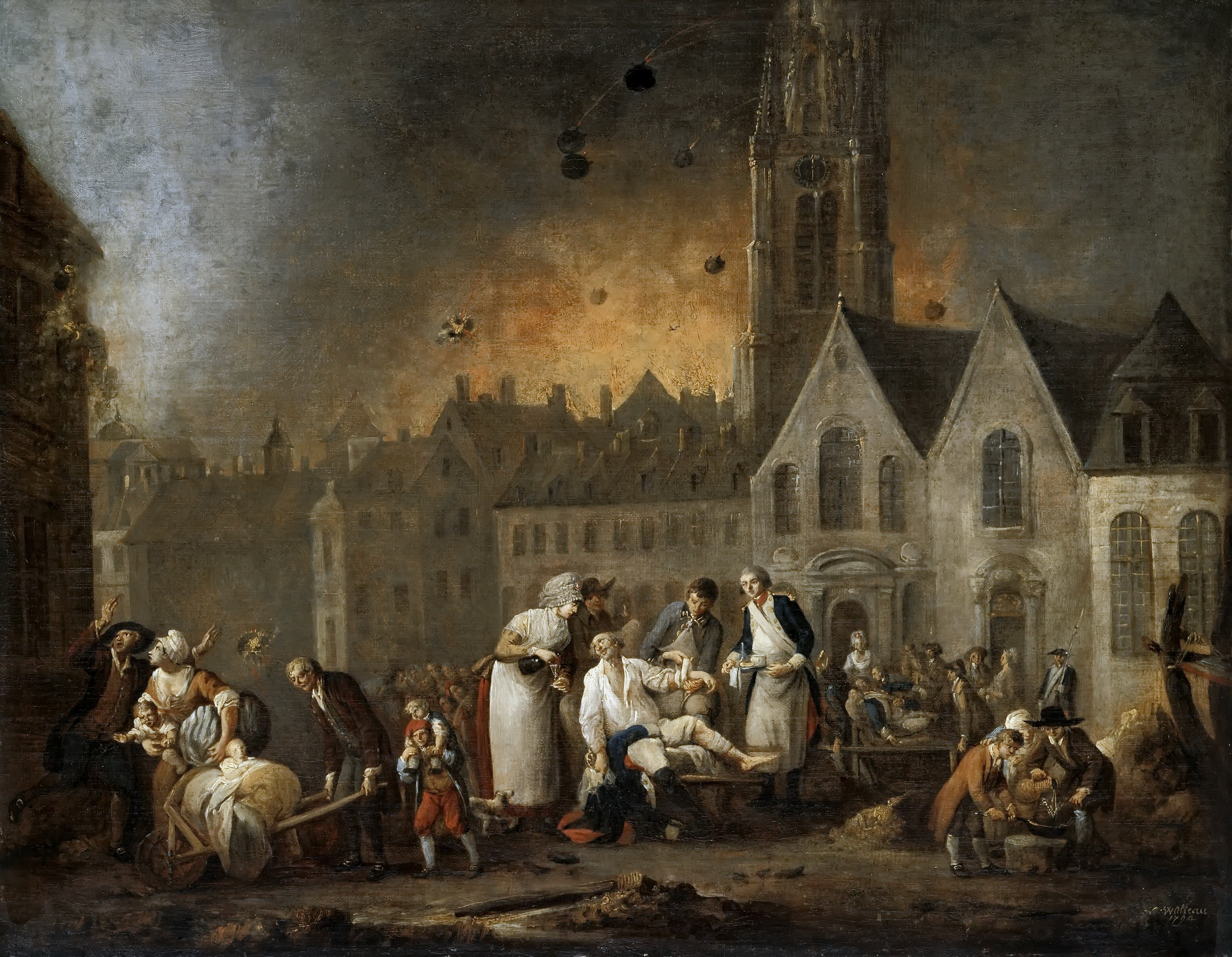
Siege of Lille in 1792

The Franco-Austrian War saw Northern France as a significant battleground following the Brabant and Liège revolutions. France declared war on Austria in April 1792, leading to the destruction of cities like Lille, Dunkirk, and Valenciennes. Austrian armies occupied French Hainaut from 1793 to 1794 until the French Revolutionary Army conquered the region and annexed Belgium. The Terror further devastated the area, dismantling structures like the Saint-Amand Abbey and depriving Cambrai of its cathedral and Gothic churches. Under Napoleon, the Nord department made substantial efforts to rebuild and unify administratively and socially. However, after Napoleon's defeat at the Battle of Waterloo in 1815, the region was occupied by British troops until November 1818.

=== Industrial Revolution ===
==== Economic boom ====
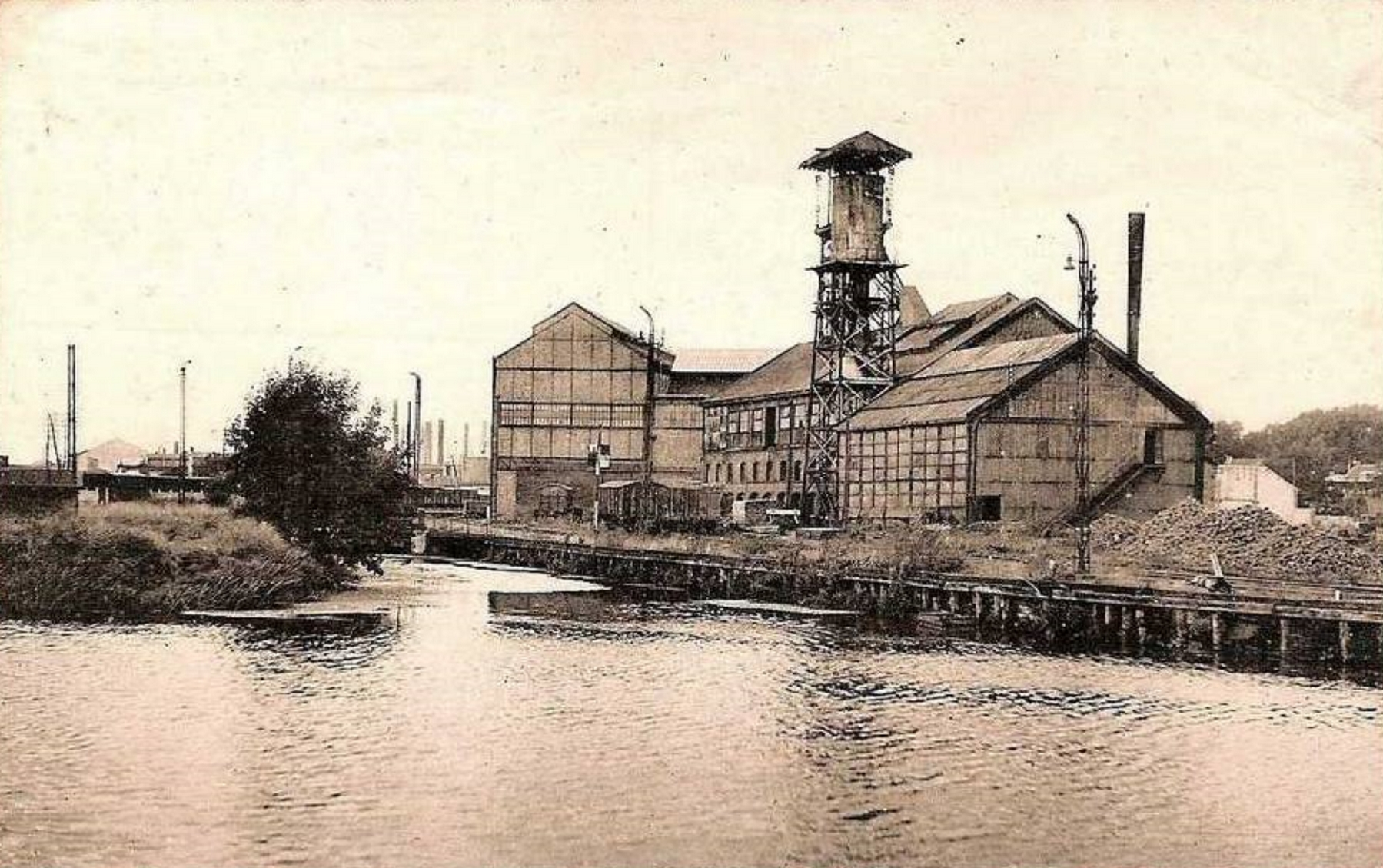
No. 3 pit of the Escarpelle mines

In the early 19th century, Northern France experienced significant economic development, propelled into the Industrial Revolution by several key factors. Napoleon's continental blockade against the United Kingdom forced the region to produce goods locally that had previously been imported, fostering the birth of industries such as sugar production. The introduction of British steam engines into spinning mills also accelerated production. Central areas rich in coal, from Béthune to Valenciennes, became crucial energy sources, further boosted by the protectionist policies of the Restoration era after Belgium's emergence in 1830.

==== Working class ====
While the industrial boom turned Northern France into an economic powerhouse for over a century, it brought severe hardships for the working class. Miners, as depicted in Émile Zola's "Germinal", faced grueling conditions and meager wages, risking their health underground. Textile workers also endured harsh conditions. The 19th century added to their suffering with extreme weather events and five cholera epidemics between 1832 and 1866, the last of which claimed 10,584 lives in the Nord département alone.

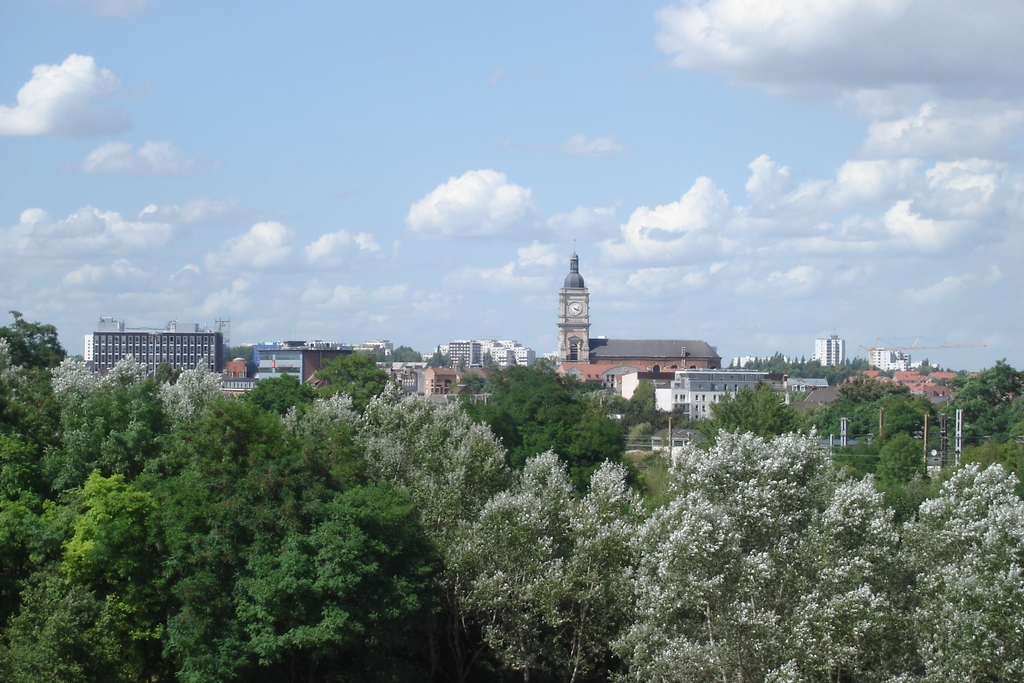
Lens

=== World War I ===
When the First World War started, the region became a strategic target for the Allies and the Central Powers, mostly because of the coal and mining resources. When the German troops launched their attack from Belgium, the region was one of the first to fall under German occupation. Nevertheless, when the Allies stopped Germany at the Battle of Marne, the front moved back to the area and stabilized near Arras. During the next four years, the region was split in two: the German holding the French Flanders and Cambrai area, the Allied controlling Arras and the Area of Lens. Nevertheless, the combat did not stop, each side wanting the total control of the area.

Canadian National Vimy Memorial near Arras

The Nord-pas-de-Calais was one of the main theaters of the conflict, with many battles occurring between 1914 and 1918, including the Battle of Vimy Ridge assault during the Battle of Arras (1917), the Battle of Artois, Battle of Loos, and the Battle of Cambrai. By the time the region was finally liberated by the Canadian Expeditionary Forces, the entire country was devastated, and Arras had been 90% destroyed. Currently, there are 650 military cemeteries throughout the Nord-Pas-de-Calais, mostly British and Canadian, as well as large memorials such as the Canadian National Vimy Memorial and Notre Dame de Lorette, the world's largest French military cemetery.

=== Between the wars ===
After the war, the industrial region of Nord-Pas-de-Calais was devastated, and in 1919 was classified as a red or yellow zone for around two-thirds of its surface area.

The reconstruction movement made massive use of immigration, particularly from Poland, to compensate for the decline in population due to the war, and to adapt to the new legislation limiting the working day to eight hours. But the economic crisis of the 1930s soon prevented any real economic or cultural renaissance. It also led to downsizing, with recent immigrants the first to be affected.

The region saw a breakthrough of the extreme right, including the "green shirts" among the peasants, which prompted Le-Nord-Pas-de-Calais to unite. When the Front Populaire came to power in France in 1936, three deputies from the Nord were in government, including Roger Salengro. Factories went on strike en masse during the Matignon Accords.

=== World War II ===
During the occupation of France, it was attached to the Military Administration in Belgium and Northern France, ruled from the Wehrmacht kommandantur in Brussels. The Nord-Pas-de-Calais region was used for vengeance weapon installations, including extensive V-1 "ski sites" that launched attacks on England and massive bunkers for the V-2 rocket and V-3 cannon. Operation Crossbow counteroffensive bombing by the Allies devastated many of the region's towns. Although most of the region was liberated in September 1944, Dunkirk was the last Franco Nord-Pas-de-Calais German occupation (on 9 May 1945).

=== Postwar period ===
Presidents of Nord-Pas-de-Calais
President	Party	Term
Pierre Mauroy	PS	1974–1981
Noël Josèphe	PS	1981–1992
Marie-Christine Blandin	Green	1992–1998
Michel Delebarre	PS	1998–2001
Daniel Percheron	PS	2001–

Since the war, the region has suffered from severe economic difficulties (see Economy below) but has benefited from the opening of the Channel Tunnel and the growth in cross-Channel traffic in general.

=== Post-war effort and economic expansion ===
Following World War II, France embarked on a significant recovery effort termed "Union sacrée", aiming to rebuild the nation under a managed economy. General de Gaulle's speech in Lille emphasized the state's role in national economic development. In 1946, the nationalization of companies in the Nord-Pas-de-Calais region led to the formation of Houillères du Nord-Pas-de-Calais, with miners receiving special privileges. The steel industry also expanded, benefiting from modernization efforts funded by the Marshall Plan.

=== Economic reconstruction and television ===
By the early 1950s, Nord-Pas-de-Calais had regained its industrial strength, primarily in traditional sectors like textiles, coal, and steel, which were starting to decline. This period also marked the advent of regional television with the creation of Télé-Lille in 1950, the first regional television station in France. Despite technological advancements, the region faced economic challenges due to a lack of diversification.

=== Algerian War and social tensions ===
The Algerian War in the mid-20th century significantly impacted the Nord-Pas-de-Calais region, home to a large population of Algerian immigrants. This led to social tensions and conflicts between French and Algerian communities, exacerbated by internal strife among Algerians supporting different nationalist movements. The war's impact was felt through numerous violent incidents, including attacks and street shootings, resulting in significant casualties and social unrest.

=== Industrial decline and economic transition ===
From the 1950s to the 1980s, Nord-Pas-de-Calais experienced a gradual decline in coal mining, textiles, and steel industries, resulting in substantial job losses. The government attempted to revitalize the region's economy by promoting the automotive industry and attracting plastics companies, which created new employment opportunities. Despite these efforts, the transition highlighted the challenges of shifting from traditional industries to more diversified economic activities.

== Demographics ==
While the region is predominantly French-speaking, it also has two significant minority language communities: the western Flemings, whose presence is evident in the many Dutch place names in the area and who speak West Flemish, a dialect of Dutch (perhaps 20,000 inhabitants of Nord-Pas-de-Calais use Flemish daily and an estimated 40,000 use it occasionally, both primarily in and around the arrondissement of Dunkirk); and the Picards, who speak the Picard language, or Ch'ti (speakers, "chitimi", have been working to revive the nearly-extinct regional speech since the 1980s). Although neighbouring Belgium currently recognizes and fosters both Picard and Dutch, and a few city-level governments within Nord-Pas-de-Calais have introduced initiatives to encourage both languages, the national French government maintains a policy of linguistic unity and generally ignores both languages, as it does with other regional languages in France.

The region's ethnic diversity has been affected by repeated waves of immigrant workers from abroad: Belgians and Welsh before 1910; Poles and Italians in the 1920s and 1930s; Eastern European groups and Germans since 1945; and North Africans and Portuguese since 1960; and large cities like Lille, Calais, and Boulogne-sur-Mer are home to sizable communities of British, Dutch, Scandinavian, Greek and Balkans, Sub-Saharan African, and Latin American immigrants and their descendants.

The French state has sought to boost the region's relatively neglected culture. In 2004, it was announced that a branch of the Louvre would be opened in the city of Lens. For decades, the Nord-Pas-de-Calais has been viewed as a conservative region when compared culturally to the rest of France, but recently the region has at times displayed left-wing tendencies. In the early 2000s, the leftist Green Party won the largest number of votes to nearly carry a majority in regional and local representation. The Greens managed to attract many conservative voters from small towns and farmers moved by the Greens' commitment to boosting agri-industry.

The region's religious profile is representative of France as a whole, with the majority being Roman Catholic. Other Christian groups are found in the region: Protestants have a few churches. North Africans have introduced Islam to the region, and small but growing communities of Buddhists have been established in recent years. Prior to World War II, around 4,000 Jews lived in Nord-Pas-de-Calais. A small Jewish community remains active as it has been for hundreds of years.

== Economy ==
=== General data ===
In 2014, the Nord-Pas de Calais GDP reached €140 billion making it the 4th biggest French economy, although this figure has to be put in the context of the large population of the region. The region was only in 16th place out of 24 for GDP per capita in 2014 with €34,422.

The unemployment rate is higher than the national average. About 11% of the population was unemployed in 2014, particularly people aged between 18 and 25.

The economy is essentially led by the service sector, which employs 75% of the working population, followed by manufacturing (23%) and agriculture (2%).

=== Agriculture and fishing ===
Due to its location close to the North Sea, the Nord-Pas de Calais region has a strong fishing industry.

The Boulogne-sur-Mer harbor is the biggest French port in terms of capacity with more than 150 boats. 45,000 tons of fish were traded there in 2012. The harbor is also a leading European seafood processing center with 380,000 tons of shellfish, fish and seaweed traded every year. Some 140 companies are present in the port.

The agricultural sector comprises 13,800 farm businesses using 820,000 hectares (2,000,000 acres) of farmland. The temperate climate as well as great fertility makes the region a leading production center. The Nord-Pas de Calais region supplied 26.1 million tons of wheat (approximately 7% of the national production) and a third of the French potato production.

=== Industry ===
The region's industry was originally focused on coal and textile production, and was one of the cradles of the Industrial Revolution on the continent. After the end of the Second World War, migrant workers from all over Europe came to the region, making up for population losses due to the war. In the 1970s, the leading coal and textile industries began to fade away and unemployment rates increased rapidly. The region started a process of restructuring which still continues today. Nowadays, the manufacturing sector is led by the automobile industry.

The Nord-Pas de Calais Mining Basin was the leading region of coal production in France in the late 19th and early 20th centuries. For its three-hundred-year history of mining and its testimony to the advent of industrialization in France, the mining basin was listed on the UNESCO World Heritage List in 2012.

==== Automobile industry ====
In the 1970s, the sector represented a small part of the working population. Some 40 years later, it is the main industry in the region, employing 55,000 people. In terms of productivity, the Nord-Pas de Calais region is ranked second nationwide and is one of the main export areas.

Three main worldwide car manufacturers operate plants in the region: Toyota produce the Yaris in Valenciennes, Renault build the Scénic in Douai, and PSA Peugeot Citroën operate a plant in Lieu-Saint-Amand where Peugeot 807, Citroën C8, Fiat Scudo, Peugeot Expert and Citroën Jumpy are fabricated. In addition, automotive equipment manufacturers such as Faurecia employ 6,200 workers in the region. Small-scale manufacturers have also been based in the region, such as microcar manufacturers ERAD, Savel, and Secma.

Nord-Pas de Calais is the second main region for the automotive industry in France after Île de France (Paris region). The sector trade fair, the Forum on European Automotive Industry in Lille Region (FEAL), takes place biennially to showcase the industry of the region and its importance for France and Europe.

==== Food industry ====
The food industry in Nord-Pas de Calais draws on the agricultural sector of the region. By income, this is the most important industry of the region due to strong exports (€3.2bn in 2006). More than 27,000 employees were employed in the sector in 2007. Many global corporations such as McCain Foods, Roquette Freres, Bonduelle, Pasquier or Boulangeries Paul are present in the Nord-Pas de Calais region.

=== Services ===
==== Mulliez family ====
The services sector of the Nord-Pas de Calais region is dominated by the multi-billionaire Mulliez family, who own the main superstore chains of the region, some of which are known worldwide: Auchan, Decathlon or Leroy Merlin as well as the Flunch restaurant chain. The family also holds a stake in 3 Suisses, Norauto and many other companies.

== Transport infrastructures ==
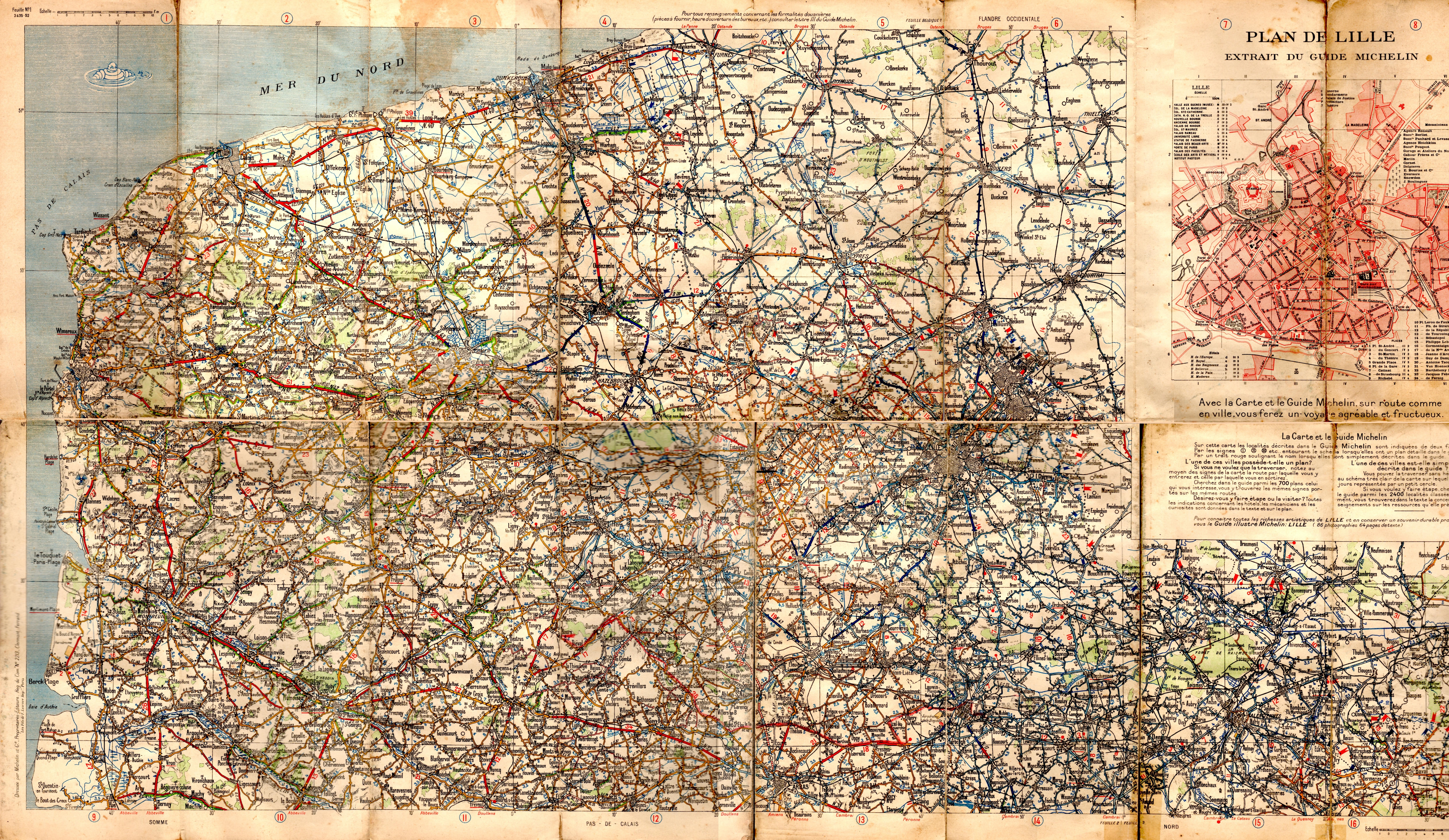
A map of the Nord-Pas-de-Calais region from the early 1920s, showing the road and railway network of that time

As most of its population is urbanized, the region has a dense and complex transport system of highways, railways, airport and seaports.

=== Highways ===
Nine highways are passing through the region; most of them are free:

- A1 between Lille and Paris
- A2 towards Brussels
- A16 Between Dunkirk and Paris
- A21 between Bouvignies and Pecquencourt
- A22 between Lille and Ghent
- A23 between Lesquin and Valenciennes
- A25 between Dunkirk and Lille
- A26 between Calais and Troyes
- A27 between Lille and Tournai

=== Railways ===
==== Eurotunnel ====
Since 1994, the Nord-Pas de Calais region is linked to the United Kingdom by the Eurotunnel. The structure comprises three tunnels (one single-track railway tunnel each way and a service road tunnel for maintenance and emergency use) and has the longest undersea tunnel section of the world (38 kilometres (24 mi)). The whole structure is 50 kilometres (31 mi) long and connects Coquelles, France with Folkestone, UK. Between its official opening and 2012, 300 million passengers have crossed the English Channel aboard Eurostar trains. In addition to Eurostar services, the tunnel is used by trains carrying road vehicles, branded as Le Shuttle, as well as freight trains.

==== TER-Nord ====
The TER-Nord is the regional rail network operated by the SNCF. It links the major cities and villages throughout Nord-Pas de Calais. The network is controlled by the Conseil régional.

=== Air transportation ===
The main airport of Nord-Pas de Calais is Lesquin Airport near Lille. Originally a regional hub, the airport now has several international routes to destinations in Europe and the Maghreb.

=== Inland and international freight transport ===
==== Dunkirk Harbour ====
Dunkirk Harbour is one of the biggest seaports of France. It is the third-largest port nationally in terms of total volume but first in fruit and copper imports. A terminal able to handle LNG carriers is built by TotalEnergies.

==== Canal Seine-Nord ====
The Canal Seine-Nord is a future high-capacity canal between the Seine and Arleux to connect the former to the other northern canals in Belgium, the Netherlands and Germany. It is due to open in 2016. The project has attracted controversy mostly because of its huge cost (€4.6bn).

== Sports and culture ==
=== Training base for the Olympics ===
Before London 2012, the region had been chosen by the Organising Committee as a training base for the participating delegations. During the months ahead of the Olympics, several countries sent their athletes to the region to prepare for the competitions. Among the teams training in Nord-Pas de Calais were the UK Gymnastics team in Arques, the New Zealand Rowing team in Gravelines and France's national basketball and handball teams.

=== Sports in Nord-Pas de Calais ===
Football is the most developed sport of the region. More than 145,000 players are members of a football club. Four clubs have professional status and play at the highest levels: Lille OSC and RC Lens in Ligue 1 and Valenciennes FC in Ligue 2 and USBCO in the Championnat National. Arras Football's ladies play in Division 1.

== Major communities ==
- Lille and surrounding area is home to over 1.5 million inhabitants.
- Arras
- Boulogne
- Calais
- Cambrai
- Douai
- Dunkirk
- Lens
- Liévin
- Marcq-en-Barœul
- Maubeuge
- Roubaix
- Saint-Omer
- Tourcoing
- Valenciennes
- Villeneuve d'Ascq
- Wattrelos

== Education ==
The regional education system of the Académie de Lille includes one million pupils and students. Higher education and research are supported within the Community of Universities and Institutions (COMUE) Lille Nord de France – (University of Lille).

An invitation to tender for a school construction and maintenance contract let by the region and the Département du Nord in 1998 included provision for employment generation to be included as an evaluation criterion for the award of the contract. The European Court of Justice held that the award criterion was illegal, but also ruled that where a contracting authority had to assess two or more economically equivalent bids, they could adopt employment opportunities as an "accessory criterion" as long as the use of this criterion was not discriminatory.

== See also ==
- List of châteaux in Nord-Pas-de-Calais
- Cuisine and specialties of Nord-Pas-de-Calais
- Culture of Nord-Pas-de-Calais
- Religion in Nord-Pas-de-Calais

== Bibliography ==
- Collectif (1988). Le Nord, de la Préhistoire à nos jours (in French). Bordessoules. ISBN 2-903504-28-8.
- C'artouche (2000). Pas-de-Calais : Histoire d'un renouveau (in French). Librairie Arthème Fayard. ISBN 2-213-60733-8.
- Desmulliez, Jacqueline; Milis, L. J. R. (2008). Histoire des provinces françaises du Nord : De la préhistoire à l'An Mil (in French). Artois presses université. ISBN 978-2-903077-71-6.
- Pierrard, Pierre (1978). Histoire du Nord : Flandre, Artois, Hainaut, Picardie (in French). Hachette. ISBN 2-01-020306-2.
