= Jules Pasquier =

French politician

- Born: 1 April 1839; Goudelancourt-lès-Pierrepont, Aisne, France
- Died: 10 March 1928 (aged 88); Laon, Aisne, France
- Title: Baron
- Political party: Popular Liberal Action

Jules Pasquier (1839-1928) was a French politician.

== Early life ==
Jules Pasquier was born on 1 April 1839 in Goudelancourt-lès-Pierrepont, France. He was educated in Reims.

== Career ==
Pasquier started his career as a civil law notary in 1866.

Pasquier joined the Popular Liberal Action, a conservative political party. He served as the mayor of Autremencourt. He served as a member of the Chamber of Deputies from 22 September 1889 to 14 October 1893, and from 5 March 1905 to 31 May 1910. He voted against the 1905 French law on the Separation of the Churches and the State.

== Death ==
He died on 10 March 1928 in Laon, France.
