= Roquette Frères =

French company

Roquette
- Type: Private
- Industry: Food; Pharmaceutical; Biochemical; Animal Nutrition
- Incorporated: France
- Founded: 1 January 1957
- Headquarters: Lestrem, France
- Number of locations: 30 Establishments (18 production sites and 12 offices) to be updated for 2012
- Area served: Worldwide
- Key people: Dominique Roquette (Associate Founder); Germain Roquette (Associate Founder)
- Products: Products List: Sugars; Starch Products; Polyols (Sugar alcohols); Derivatives of Fermentation; Proteins and Their Derivatives; Fibers and Oils; Bio-ethanol; Dietary Fibers; Fine Chemistry Products
- Website: Roquette Corporate

Roquette is a French-based family owned company which produces more than 650 by-products from the starch extracted from corn, wheat, potatoes and peas. Founded and headquartered in Lestrem, France in 1933 by the brothers Dominique and Germain Roquette, Roquette has grown to become the leader in starch production in Europe and the number four ranked producer of starch worldwide. It is also the leader in the production of Polyols worldwide (substances derived from food compounds). Roquette employs more than 8,360 people globally and achieved a turnover of over 2,5 billion euros in 2011.

== History ==
At the beginning of the Great Depression in 1933 grain brokers Dominique and Germain Roquette along with the aid of ICAM engineer Adam Grunewald created a potato starch plant named Roquette in Lestrem. From this point on Roquette has grown to 30 establishments. Below is a list of the firm's major development stages since its beginning.

- 1933 - Dominique and Germain Roquette start the first Roquette potato starch plant in Lestrem, France
- 1946 - Construction of the corn starch plant in Lestrem, France
- 1954 - Lestrem facility begins industrial production of sorbitol
- 1956 - Construction of the potato starch plant in Vecquemont, France
- 1961 - Construction of the corn starch plant in Cassano Spinola, Italy
- 1977 - Construction of the corn starch plant in Beinheim, France
- 1982 - Construction of the sorbitol production unit in Gurnee, Illinois, United States
- 1986 - Construction of the wheat starch plant at Lestrem, France facility
- 1991 - Take-over of a corn starch plant in Keokuk, Iowa, United States
- 1993 - Lestrem facility launches the start of maltitol production
- 1997 - Take-over of the corn starch plant in Calafat, Romania
- 1998 - Construction of the wheat starch plant in Beinheim, France
- 2000 - Take-over of the wheat starch plant in Corby, England, as of September 2020, staff were advised that the plant will cease production as of 20 December 2020, all staff will be made redundant.
- 2001 - Take-over of two sorbitol production units in Lianyungang, Jiangsu, China and Ulsan, Korea
- 2008 - Take-over of the B.P.S. (Bioprodukte Steinberg), production of microalgae in Klotze, Germany
- 2018 - Acquisition of the American firm Sethness, described as the world leader in caramel colorings for the food and beverage industry. Roquette took over Sethness’s four production facilities (in China, India, the United States, and France) as well as its 250 employees.
- 2023 - Acquisition of Qualicaps, headquartered in Nara, Japan
- 2024 - Acquisition of IFF Pharma Solutions headquartered in New York, United States

== Locations ==
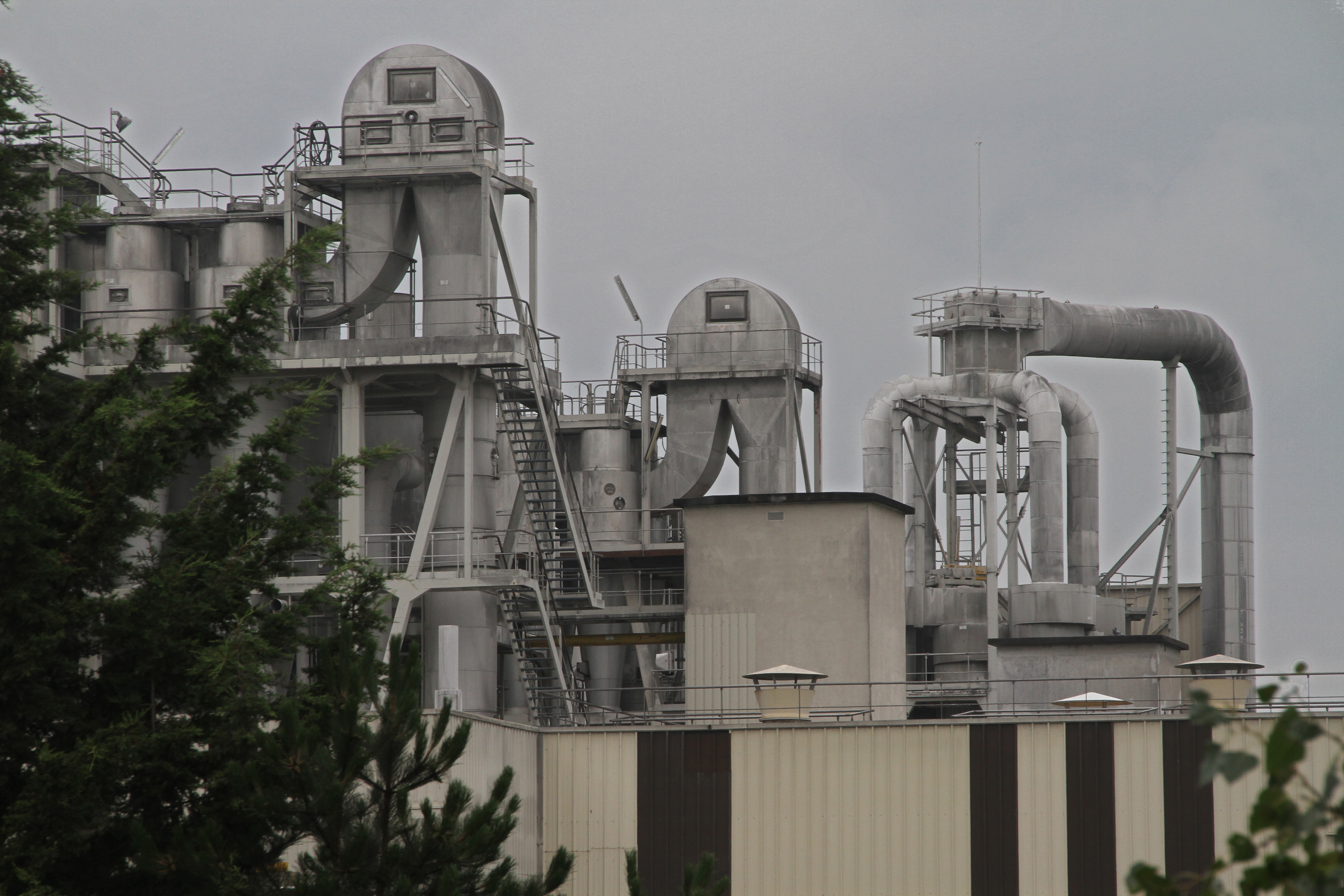
Roquette Frères à Beinheim (France)

Worldwide Roquette has 18 production sites and 12 offices located on three continents, Europe, Asia, and North America. Lestrem is the largest Roquette facility in Europe and is home to the companies main research and development center which employs more than 250 researchers. Along with the Lestrem facility Europe is home to 4 Roquette offices and 10 other production facilities (6 of which are found in France).

Since the 1980s, Roquette has been strengthening its international presence with various factories or offices in the United States, China, Korea, Japan, India, Russia and Mexico. The United States is home to 2 production sites found in Keokuk, Iowa and Gurnee, Illinois. Roquette also has 2 Chinese production plants found in Nanning, Guangxi and Lianyungang, Jiangsu. A third Asian production plant is located in Ulsan, Korea.

== Products ==
Roquette's products fall into five major product categories; native starches and proteins, physically and chemically modified starches, hydrolyzed and isomerised products, hydrogenated products, and fermentation process derivatives and fine chemicals. In 2021, Roquette ranked first in the Modified Starch category of FoodTalks' Global Food Thickener Companies list, and third on Foodtalks' Global Top 40 Plant Protein Companies list. Roquette is world leader in polyols (sugar alcohols) such as Lycasin.

== Legal disputes ==
In November 2010, Roquette Freres SA joined with Solazyme Inc., a San Francisco maker of algae-based biofuel and nutritional products, to form Solazyme Roquette Nutritionals LLC (SRN). Solazyme Inc. leaves the venture in June 2013.

In mid-2014, Roquette announces the opening of a microalgae production unit at its industrial site in Lestrem, France.

In February 2015, Roquette Freres SA lost its legal battle against Solazyme Inc., with the arbitration panel awarding all SRN patents to Solazyme Inc.
