= François Bracci =

French football player and manager (1951–2023)

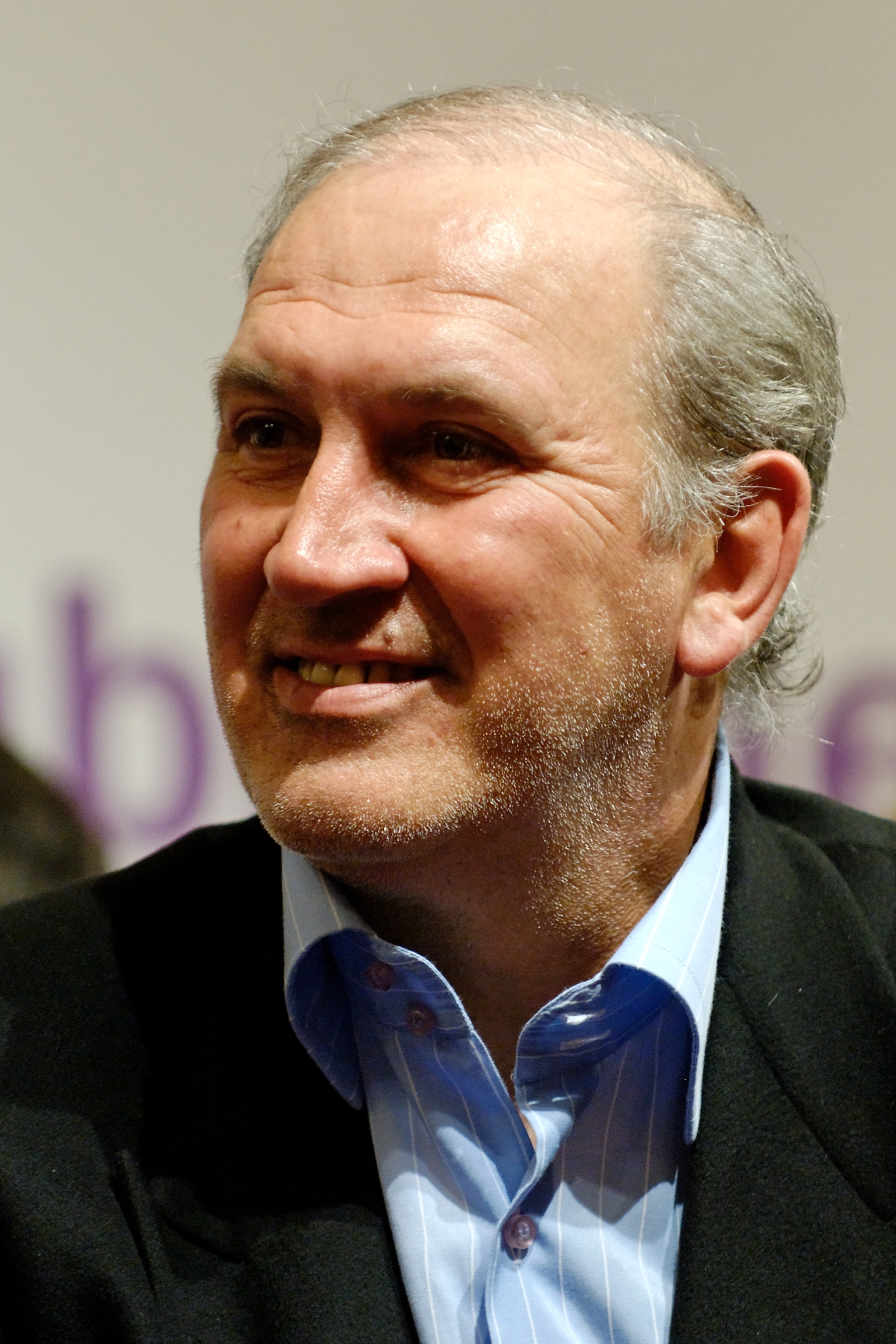
- Bracci in 2009

Personal information
- Date of birth: 31 October 1951
- Place of birth: Beinheim, France
- Date of death: 28 December 2023 (aged 72)
- Place of death: Alès, France
- Position: Defender

Youth career
- Ste-Marguerite
- US Rouet

Senior career*
Years	Team	Apps	(Gls)
1971–1979	Marseille	231	(8)
1979–1980	Strasbourg	26	(2)
1980–1983	Bordeaux	112	(3)
1983–1985	Marseille	58	(5)
1985–1986	Rouen	32	(3)
1986–1987	Béziers	16	(0)
Total		475	(21)

International career
1973–1982	France	18	(0)

Managerial career
- 1985–1986: Rouen
- 1992–1993: La Roche Vendée Football
- 1996–1997: Toulon
- 2002–2003: ES Fréjus
- 2003–2004: CS Constantine
- 2006: MC Alger
- 2007: Olympique Khouribga
- 2007: FUS Rabat
- 2008: DHJ El Jadida
- 2009–2010: MC Alger
- 2010: Club Africain
- 2011–2012: MC Alger
- 2012: DHJ El Jadida
- 2015: CS Constantine
- 2016: RC Relizane
- 2016: GC Mascara
- 2017: DRB Tadjenanet
- * Club domestic league appearances and goals

François Bracci (31 October 1951 – 28 December 2023) was a French football manager and player.

== Club career ==
Bracci was born in Beinheim, France on 31 October 1951. He totalled 34 games for Strasbourg, scoring 2 goals.

== International career ==
Bracci obtained a total number of 18 international caps for the France national team. Playing for Olympique de Marseille (1971–1979), he was a member of the French squad that competed at the 1978 FIFA World Cup. His final international was a May 1982 friendly match against Bulgaria.

== Death ==
Bracci died near Alès on 28 December 2023, at the age of 72.
