= Culture of Nord-Pas-de-Calais =

Cultural features of Nord-Pas-de-Calais

The culture of Nord-Pas-de-Calais is a component of French culture where multiple influences intertwine. The region has always been a crossroads of Europe, experiencing a great mix of population due to the various wars it has endured and the immigration it has attracted.

== A population of diverse origins ==
=== History ===
As early as the 6th century, the region was the product of various cultures: Celtic due to the different Gallic peoples who settled there during the La Tène period, Roman since Julius Caesar's Gallic Wars, and Germanic through the Franks.

Flanders and Hainaut later became part of the Spanish Netherlands for several centuries before being attached to France in the 17th century. From this period dates the festive tradition of the giants of the North, as well as fairs, festivals, and carnivals.

In the 19th century, the economic prosperity of Nord-Pas-de-Calais led to an unprecedented flourishing of the Fine Arts.

More recently, Nord-Pas-de-Calais has experienced new cultural mixtures with the strong Polish immigration during the interwar period and from the 1960s when the regional industry recruited workers from the Maghreb.

=== Regional languages ===
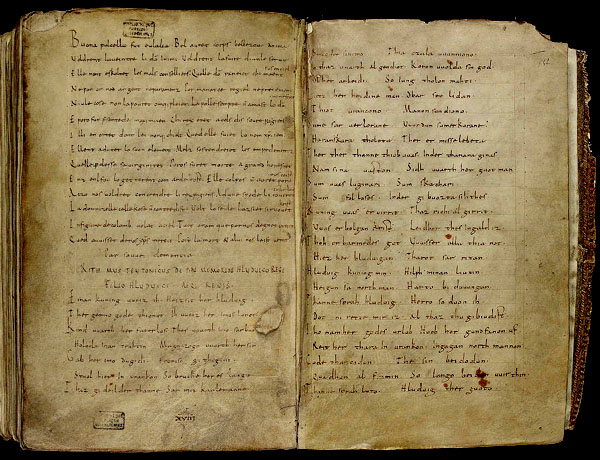
Two ancient texts in a vulgar language are part of Sequence of Saint Eulalia and Ludwigslied.

Historically, Nord-Pas-de-Calais is at the linguistic border between Romance and Germanic languages, which, stemming from Frankish invasions, evolved at least until the 9th century.

The French Revolution of 1789 associated the idea of language with that of the nation for the first time; French became the national language, and the importance of regional languages tended to decrease.

There are two regional languages and a dialect spoken in the Nord-Pas-de-Calais region:

- Picard, with its local variants such as Ch'ti or Ch'timi (Lille), or Rouchi (in Valenciennes). It is in reference to this dialect that the inhabitants of Nord-Pas-de-Calais are sometimes called Ch'tis.
- West Flemish of France, spoken in part of French Flanders, meaning in the part of the Nord department corresponding to the Dunkirk district, from the Lys to the North Sea.
- The Dunkirk dialect specific to Dunkirk and neighboring towns, a mixture of French and Flemish, with a specific accent.

=== Religions ===
Religion in Nord-Pas-de-Calais has the same status as religion in France, a secular country since 1905. Religious information is not collected during censuses, as the collection of such personal data is prohibited. The measurement of religious practices conducted by sociologists relies on other information. Surveys are frequently commissioned by various organizations but should be treated with caution. Figures provided by the Churches and organizations themselves are also used, not only for the number of believers they claim but especially for elements indicating practices: regular attendance at Mass or fasting during Ramadan, or around "rites of passage" such as marriages and religious burials.

They show that in Nord-Pas-de-Calais, despite a dechristianization observed as early as the 19th century, Catholicism remains the dominant confession; private education, mostly Catholic, educates 22.3% of students.

The continued importance of Catholic practice may surprise in a region that was a stronghold of communism; this peaceful coexistence is explained by the strong presence of social Christianity in the 20th century, and that of Christian trade unionism.

Protestantism, nearly disappeared after the outbreak of the Reformation and the iconoclastic crisis, reappeared in the 19th century.

Nord-Pas-de-Calais is home to 5 to 7 % of Muslims in France, approximately 350,000 people. This presence dates back to the early 1960s with the repatriation of Harkis after the Algerian War and was extended by the recruitment of North African workers by coal mines and steel and textile industries in the 1980s. Muslims account for an average of 5% in the Nord department, as in the Pas-de-Calais department. The city of Roubaix is a particular case, where nearly 40% of the population is Muslim.

The number of people declaring themselves without religion has been increasing in recent decades.

== Cultural Identity ==
=== The value of work ===
Nord culture places great importance on work. According to historian Jean-Pierre Wytteman, "the heritage of the North is also the struggle of men against fate," in a region that has experienced many trials.

=== Celebrations, carnivals, and giants ===
Labor, and its sometimes harshness, did not engender melancholy or austerity but rather a taste for celebration and conviviality. According to some historians, the Dunkirk carnival dates back to the early 17th century when shipowners offered fishermen, before leaving for 6 months of cod fishing in Iceland, a meal and a celebration (the "Foye"), as well as half of their salary, leaving behind wives and children.

In the mining country, miners worked double shifts without a day off during the "long cuts," the fortnight preceding Saint Barbara's Day, in order to celebrate their patron saint copiously. For steelworkers, it was Saint Eloi that was celebrated with a banquet.

==== Saint-Nicolas ====
In French Flanders, in French Hainaut, in Artois, and in Boulonnais, Saint Nicholas parades through the streets in early December with Père Fouettard and local giants, distributing candy to children. Some of these processions attract several thousand spectators each year.

In the 1500s, Saint-Nicolas' Day in Dunkirk was described as follows:

"On December 5, the eve of Saint Nicholas' Day, the patron saint of children, the schoolchildren named one of them as a bishop. Throughout December 6, the elected one had the title and immunities of the children's bishop. In this capacity, he ordered everything concerning the general celebration of the city's children. In order to contribute to it in his own way, the municipal government had two kettles of wine delivered to him, totaling 6 liters."

On December 6, 1519, the archives of the Historical Commission of the North tell us: "December 1519 – Being Saint-Nicolay's day presented to the schoolchildren's bishop, who thus celebrated his feast according to custom, two kettles of wine at viij s. the pot, xxxij s."

In the Lille metropolis, children frequently received gifts on Saint Nicholas' Day (and not at Christmas) until the 1970s. It was customary to throw eggs and flour in colleges, high schools, and universities until the 1990s, a tradition that persists in Belgium.

=== Cuisine ===
The specialties of Nord-Pas-de-Calais cuisine are largely inherited from the County of Flanders; there is also, due to its history, English influence on the Opal Coast, or dishes of Polish origin in the mining basin.

This cuisine is characterized, among other things, by the taste of bittersweet flavors such as braised endive, beer-based cuisine, or chicory coffee. Between land and sea, its basic products are herring, rabbit, endive, potato, and beer. Historically, it is a cuisine with butter or lard, although nowadays oil is also frequently used.

=== Sports and games ===
Cockfighting is part of the regional traditions. There are about twenty cockfighting arenas in Nord and Pas-de-Calais where 9,000 cockfights are organized each year.

== Fine arts ==
=== Architecture ===
Nord and Pas-de-Calais are home to numerous monuments reflecting all periods of their history. The most famous are probably the belfries, but Roman sites such as Bavai or architecture from the industrial era are also notable. As of July 31, 2016, Nord has 788 protections under historic monuments, and Pas-de-Calais has 682.

=== Museums ===
In the 21st century, the region is experiencing a cultural revival supported both at the European and local levels, leading to initiatives such as Louvre-Lens, or in Valenciennes, the PhéniX, a symbol of rebirth.

=== Popular culture ===
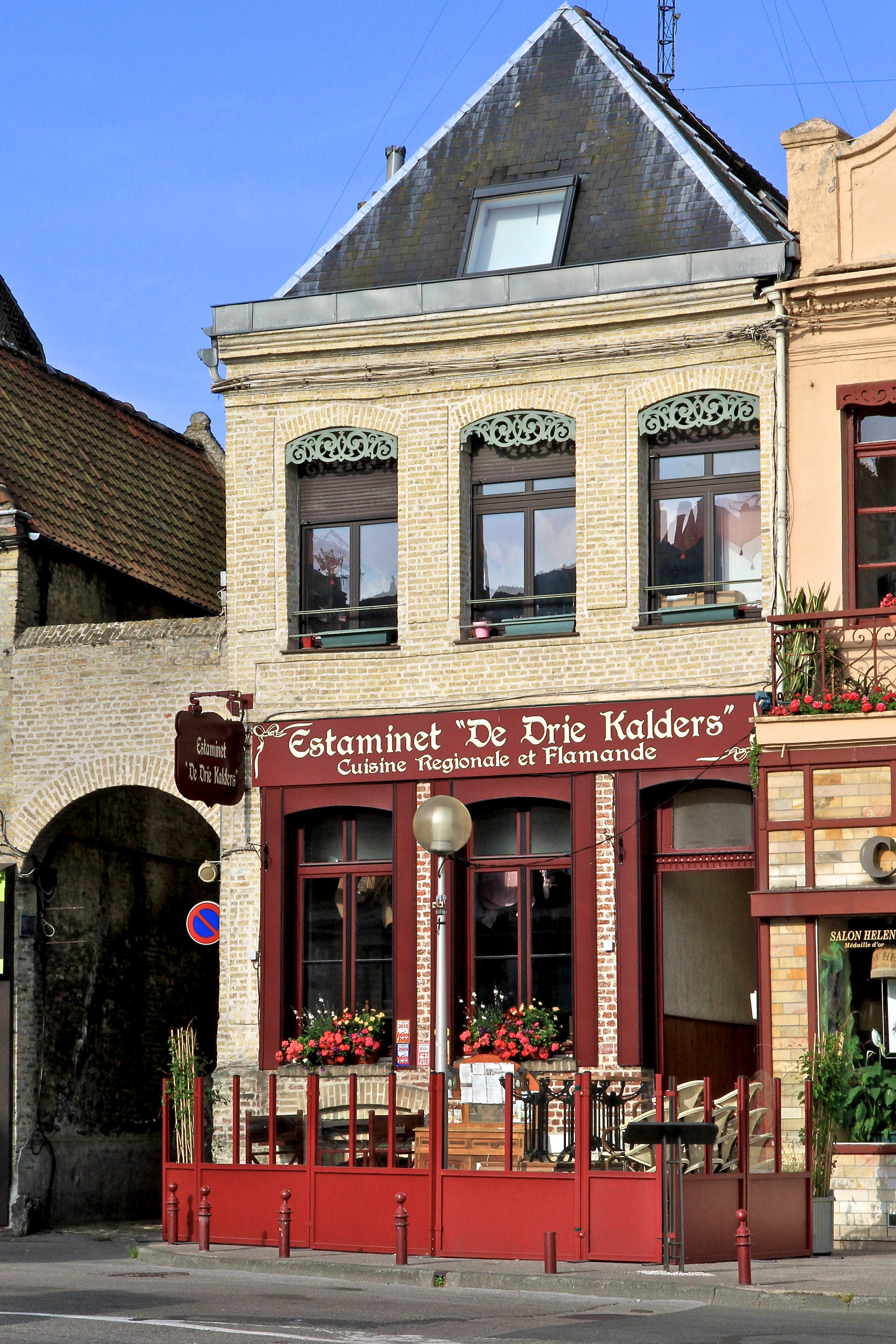

In 2008, the film Bienvenue chez les Ch'tis (Welcome to the Sticks) achieved unexpected success by showcasing the popular culture of Nord-Pas-de-Calais. According to a survey conducted by TNS Sofres in early 2011, to the question "Who best embodies the region [Nord-Pas-de-Calais]?", 68% of respondents answered Dany Boon.

While the "Ch'tis" popularized Maroilles cheese and chip stalls, the cuisine of Nord-Pas-de-Calais remains largely unknown in French gastronomy, although some products such as Houlle juniper or Cambrai "bêtises" have been classified as "Gourmet Treasures of France." However, some great chefs highlight it. Ghislaine Arabian, for example, obtained two Michelin stars in Lille with a menu devoted to beer cuisine and now offers regional cuisine in Paris. In Busnes, Marc Meurin's cuisine based on regional products also earns him two Michelin stars.

== See also ==
- Religion in Nord-Pas-de-Calais

== Bibliography ==
- Wytteman, Jean-Pierre (1988). Le Nord : de la Préhistoire à nos jours. L'histoire par les documents (in French).
- Duquesne, Jacques (1989). Les vents du Nord m'ont dit : chroniques, souvenirs et rêves (in French). Albin Michel. ISBN 2-226-03795-0.
- Bussière, Éric; Lefebvre, Bernard; Vavasseurs-Desperriers, Jean (2012). Histoire des provinces françaises du Nord : Le xixe siècle. Artois presses université. ISBN 978-2-84832-156-1.
