= Lycasin =

Trade name for hydrogenated glucose syrup

Lycasin is a trade name given by Roquette for hydrogenated glucose syrup (hydrogenated starch hydrolysates). One of the major components of Lycasin is maltitol, derived from the hydrogenation of maltose. Depending on the dextrose equivalent (DE) of the syrup used in the hydrolysis, a variety of products can be made, with the name "lycasin" normally being reserved for lycasin 80/55 (80 referring to the dry content and 55 to the dextrose equivalent). The other grades (e.g. 75/60 and 80/33) are referred to as Polysorb, but should not be confused with the polyglycolic acid suture of the same name which is produced by a different company.

Lycasin's known side effects in adults include bloating, abdominal cramps, intestinal gurgling or rumbling (borborygmi), and flatulence. Some cases of extremely intense intestinal distress have been reported from consuming foods containing Lycasin.
