= Religion in Nord-Pas-de-Calais =

Religion in France

Religion in Nord-Pas-de-Calais has the same status as religion in France, a secular country since 1905.

The region began to be Christianized before the 16th century, with the establishment of monasteries during the Merovingian (5th–8th centuries) and Carolingian (8th–9th centuries) periods.

Despite the de-Christianization that began in the 19th century, Catholicism remains the dominant denomination, with 22.3% of pupils enrolled in private, predominantly Catholic schools. Protestantism, which had largely disappeared after the Reformation and the iconoclastic crisis, experienced a revival in the 19th century. In the 20th century, the development of local industry led to strong immigration from Poland and Italy between the wars, which tended to involve Catholics, and then from North Africa from the 1960s onwards. Nord-Pas-de-Calais now accounts for 5-7% of France's Muslim population.

In recent decades, there has been an increasing number of individuals identifying as having no religion.

== History ==
=== Antiquity ===
Religious beliefs and practices in the prehistoric period are, as elsewhere, poorly understood. The Neolithic period left behind several megalithic sites, including dolmens, covered walkways, menhirs such as the "Twin Stones" at Cambrai or in the Sensée valley, cromlechs, and polissoirs. Their purpose remains uncertain but is likely religious. Between the 5th and 1st centuries BCE, the Belgians settled in the region, continuing the migratory movements of Celtic peoples that had marked it since the Tene period.

Roman accounts describe the Gauls as highly religious. When Nicene Christianity became the state religion of the Roman Empire following the Edict of Thessalonica in 380 CE, the area now known as Nord-Pas-de-Calais was largely rural and sparsely urbanized. Despite this mandate, Christianization remained minimal, something which persisted through the subsequent barbarian invasions.

=== Middle Ages ===
==== Christianization ====
Christianization began slowly in the Merovingian era, with the appointment of Vaast as bishop of Arras and Cambrai. In the 6th century, from the time of Dagobert I onwards, the Frankish aristocracy founded a number of abbeys, providing a base for the spread of Catholicism in rural areas.

These included Hamage Abbey in 625, Marchiennes Abbey and Notre-Dame de Condé in 630, Elnon Abbey in 633, Haumont Abbey in 643, Maroilles Abbey and Saint-Ghislain Abbey in 650, and Hasnon Abbey in 670. The majority of these foundations were initiated by members of the Neustrian aristocracy, notably the Pippinid family, from which the Carolingian dynasty emerged, and were supported by local aristocrats who provided land endowments.

==== Establishment of parishes ====
By the late 7th century, dioceses were equivalent to parishes: only the episcopal see had parish rights, including the administration of baptism and burial in consecrated ground. Bishops, appointed by the king, benefited from the tithe, which Pepin the Short made compulsory around 765.

==== A time of crusades and beguinages ====
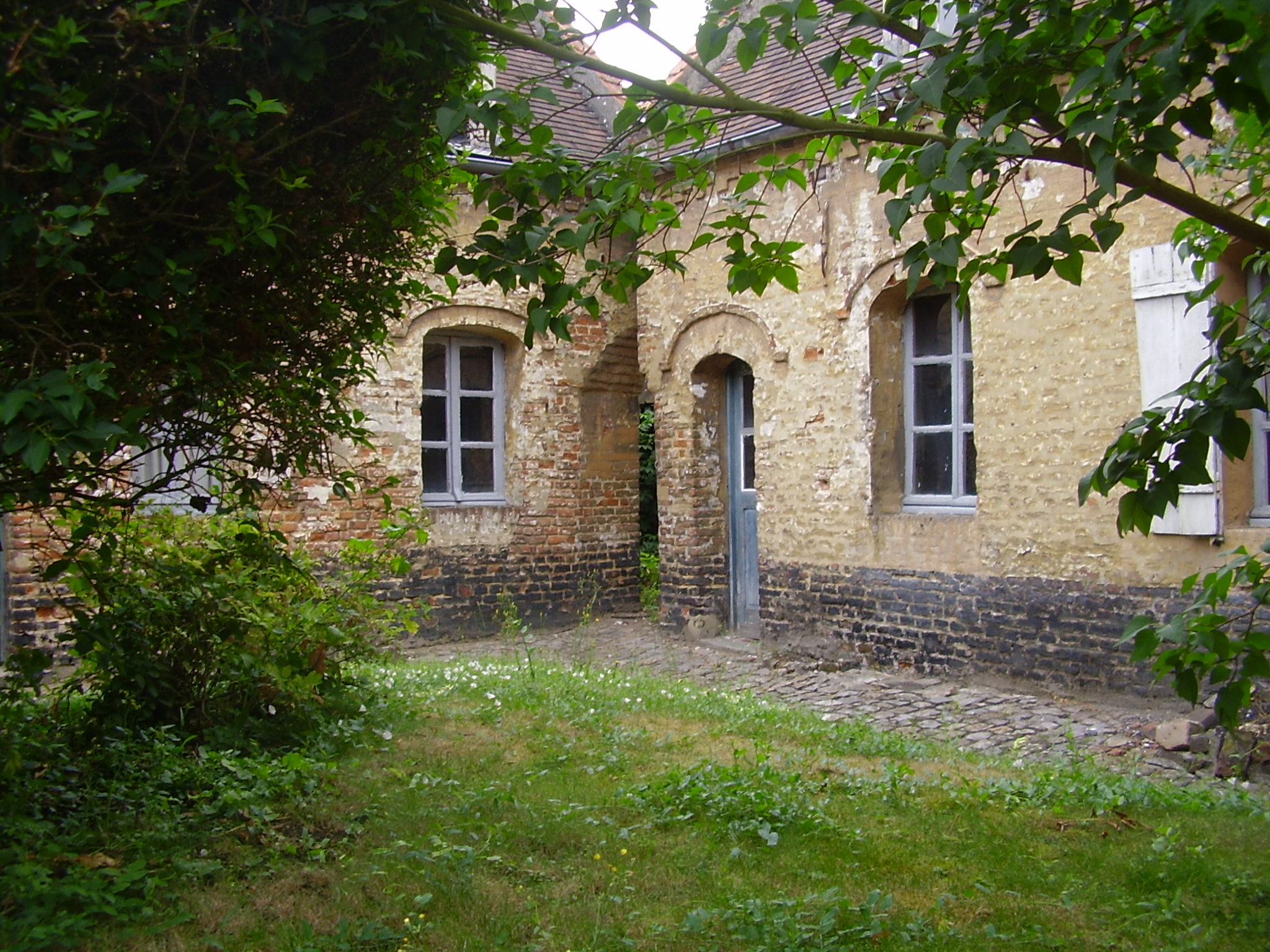
Saint-Vaast beguinage created in Cambrai in the 14th century.

In the 12th century, the Pope's call for the First Crusade found an echo in the principalities of the North. After the capture of Jerusalem and the death in the Holy Land of Godefroy de Bouillon, Count of Boulogne, his brother Baudouin de Boulogne became King of Jerusalem in 1100. Participation from the region remained significant, involving nobles, their retinues, and even bourgeois individuals who sold property to fund their journeys. Jousts during festivals like the Fête de l’Épinette—a traditional celebration in Lille—may have served as training for these campaigns.

Flanders and Hainaut saw the rise of lay spiritual movements, such as the Free Spirit, Turlupin, and Beguine communities. The Beguine movement, emerging in the early 13th century, consisted of women living a nun-like life without taking formal vows. Initially criticized at the Second Lateran Council, it later gained papal support, though it faced scrutiny from the Inquisition in the 14th century. In 1311, the mystic Marguerite Porete was burned in Paris for heresy. Her work, Miroir des âmes simples anéanties, was discussed at the Council of Vienna and served as the basis for the Ad nostrum decree condemning beguards and beguines. In 1460, the Grand Vauderie d’Arras, a notable witchcraft trial, unfolded in the region.

=== Modern times ===
==== The Protestant upsurge of the 16th century ====
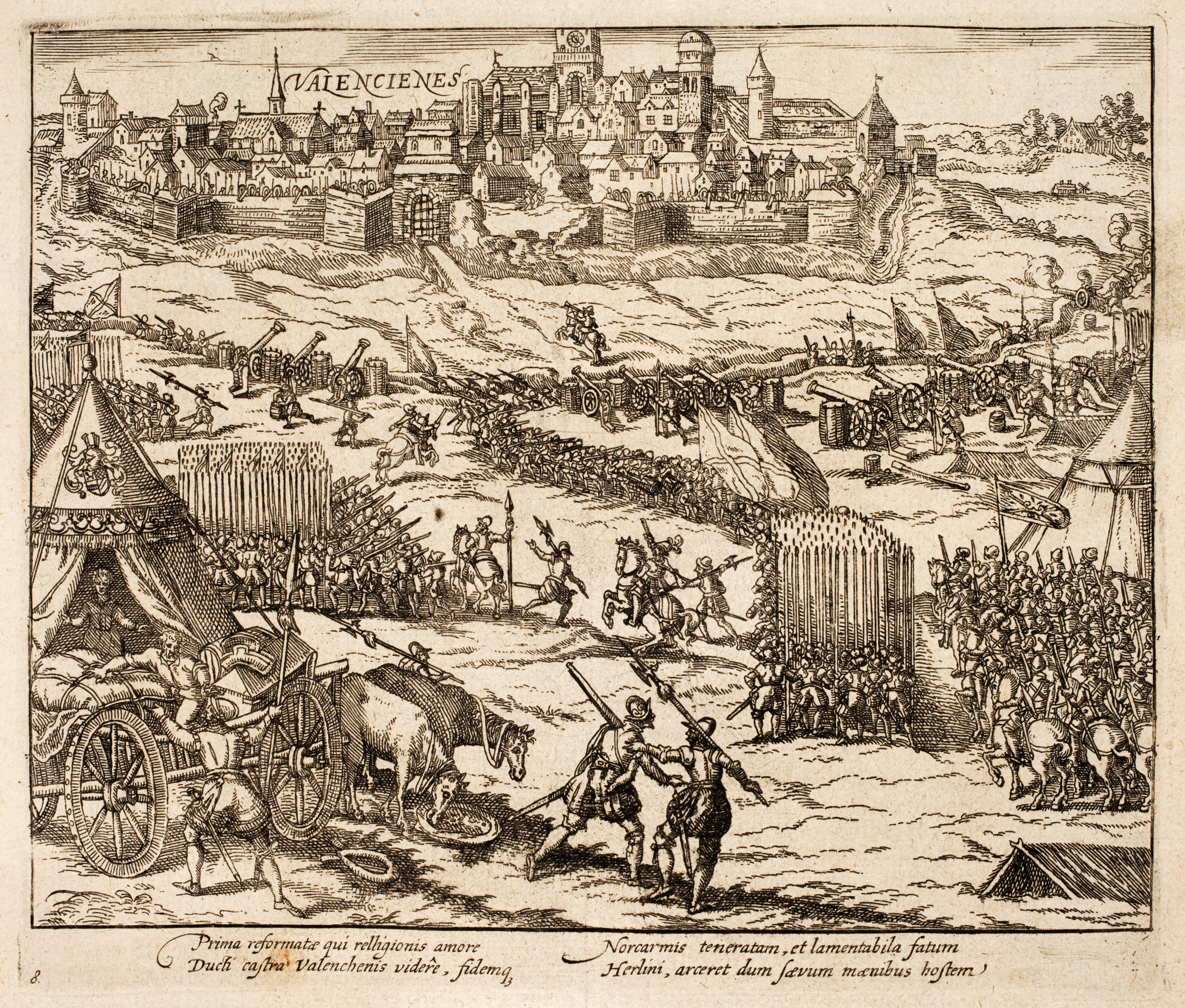
The siege of Valenciennes in 1566-67, a city declared rebellious against the king.

In the 16th century, Protestantism spread rapidly through the region for both religious and political reasons.

As part of the Catholic Counter-Reformation, the University of Douai was established in 1562, and the religious reorganization of the Spanish Netherlands led to a new ecclesiastical organization between 1559 and 1561. The dioceses of Boulogne and Saint-Omer replaced that of Thérouanne.

In 1561, reformer Guy de Brès wrote the Confessio Belgica, a Calvinist confession of faith for the Spanish Netherlands.

An insurrectionary movement peaked in 1566 with the smashing of religious images. Cities like Valenciennes and Le Cateau-Cambrésis embraced Calvinism and established new municipal governments, but Spanish troops swiftly restored order through brutal reprisals.

In 1581, the northern provinces of the Spanish Netherlands, most of them Protestant and Dutch-speaking, abjured the Spanish king and formed the United Provinces. The Southern Netherlands remained Catholic, willy-nilly, and became a satellite state of a larger empire, ruled from Madrid by the Habsburgs.

At Philip II's request, the religious reorganization of the Spanish Netherlands was initiated. He obtained the creation of new bishoprics, which increased from five to nineteen, and a territorial reorganization allowing Belgian religious powers independence from neighboring states such as the Kingdom of France. On May 12, 1559, the Bull Super Universas withdrew a large part of the territory of the Archdiocese of Cambrai in favor of the new dioceses of Mechelen and Antwerp. It retained four archdeaconries: Cambrai, Brabant, Hainaut and Valenciennes, and four suffragan bishoprics: Arras, Tournai, Namur and Saint Omer.

== Religions in the 21st century ==
=== Sociological sources ===
Denominational data is not collected in French censuses due to privacy laws, so sociologists rely on surveys and figures from religious organizations. These sources track practices like mass attendance, Ramadan fasting, and rites of passage such as religious weddings and funerals, though such data should be interpreted cautiously.

=== Christianity ===
Despite de-Christianization since the 19th century, Catholicism remains the dominant faith in Nord-Pas-de-Calais. Its resilience in a region once known for communism can be attributed to the influence of social Christianity and Christian trade unionism in the 20th century. Protestantism, nearly extinguished after the Reformation, reemerged in the 19th century.

=== Islam ===
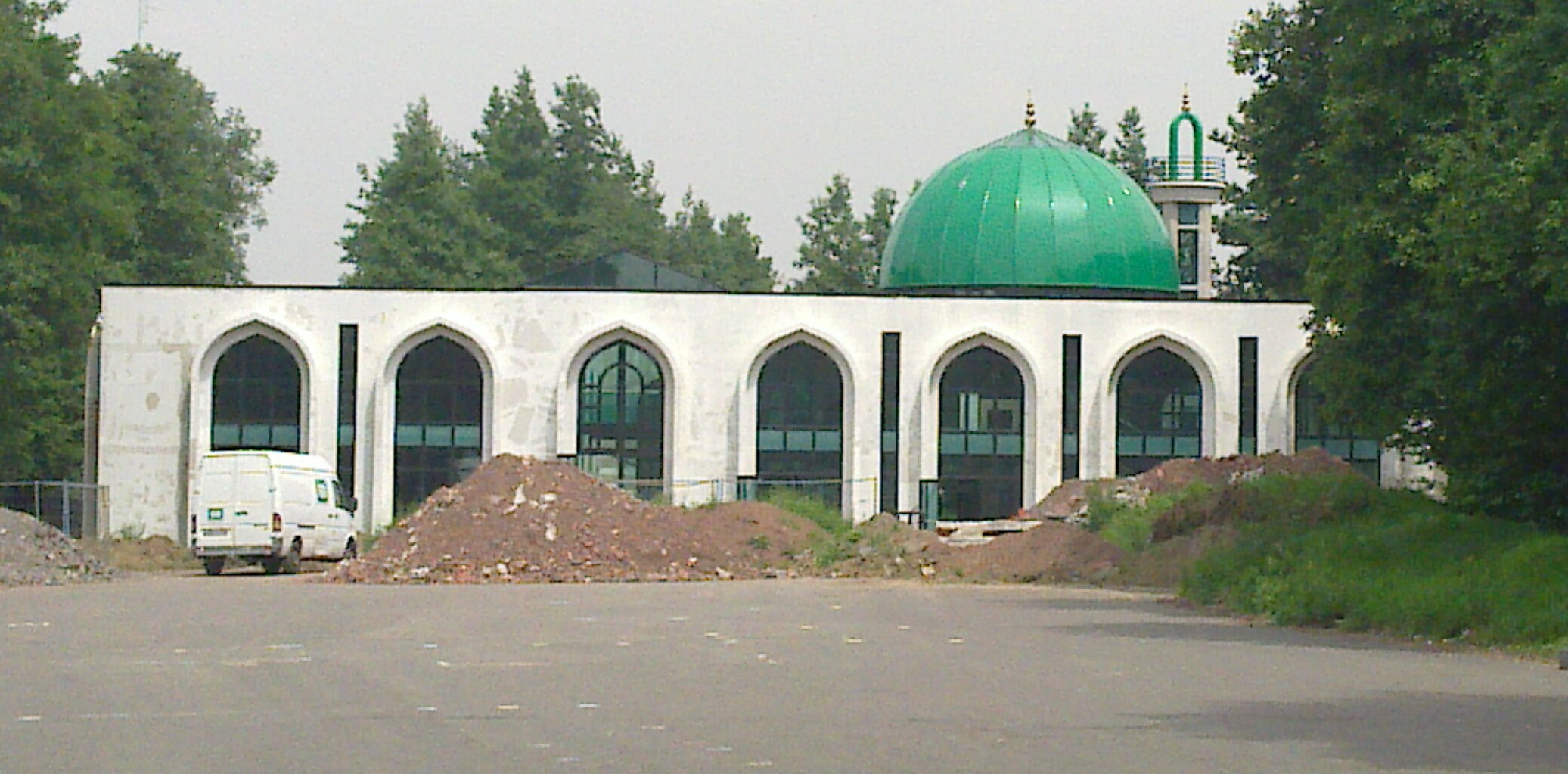
Construction of the Grand Mosque in Villeneuve-d'Ascq.

Nord-Pas-de-Calais is home to 5-7% of France's Muslim population, or 350,000 people. This presence dates back to the early 1960s, with the repatriation of Harkis after the Algerian War, and was extended by the recruitment of North African workers by the coal, steel and textile industries in the 1980s. Muslims account for an average of 5% of the population of the Nord and Pas de Calais départements. The city of Roubaix is a special case, where almost 40% of the population is Muslim. Muslim denominational education is not widespread, but a private high school opened in Lille in 2003.

== See also ==
- Nord-Pas-de-Calais
- Culture of Nord-Pas-de-Calais
- Religion in France

== Bibliography ==
- Desmulliez, Jacqueline; Milis, L. J. R. Histoire des provinces françaises du Nord : De la préhistoire à l'An Mil [History of the northern French provinces: From prehistory to the year 1000] (in French). Artois presses université.
- Collectif (1988). Le Nord, de la Préhistoire à nos jours [The Nord, from prehistory to the present day] (in French). Bordessoules. p. 381. ISBN 2-903504-28-8.
- Pierrand, Pierre (1978). Histoire des diocèses de France [History of the dioceses of France] (in French) (10th ed.).
