= Pasquier =

Pasquier is a French surname derived from Latin pascuarium (verb pascere) meaning "pasture". Pasquier shares the same root of given name and surname Pascal, from Latin Pascha, in turn from the Hebrew pesach that means literally "pass over". Alternative spellings and related names are: Pasquett, Pasquié, Pâquier, Paquier, Pasqueraud, Pasquerault, Paqueraud, Paquerault, Paquereau.

Pasquier may refer to:

- Edme-Armand-Gaston d'Audiffret-Pasquier (1823–1905), French politician and member of the Académie française,
- Étienne Pasquier (1529–1615), French lawyer and man of letters,
- Étienne-Denis Pasquier (1767–1862), French statesman
- Jérôme Pasquier (courtier), French servant and clerk of Mary, Queen of Scots
- Jules Pasquier (1839-1928), French politician.
- Jules-Paul Pasquier (1774-1858), French member of the Conseil d'État.
- Georges Pasquier (1878-?) French road racing cyclist
- Pierre Pasquier (colonial administrator) (1877-1934)
- Pierre Pasquier (violist) (1902-1986), violist
- Pierre Pasquier (born 1935), businessman
- Bruno Pasquier born 1943, violist
- Régis Pasquier born 1945, violinist
- Stéphane Pasquier (born 1978), French jockey

Du Pasquier

- L. Gustave du Pasquier (1876–1957), Swiss mathematician
- Nathalie du Pasquier (born 1957), French painter and designer
