= Goudelancourt-lès-Pierrepont =

- Commune
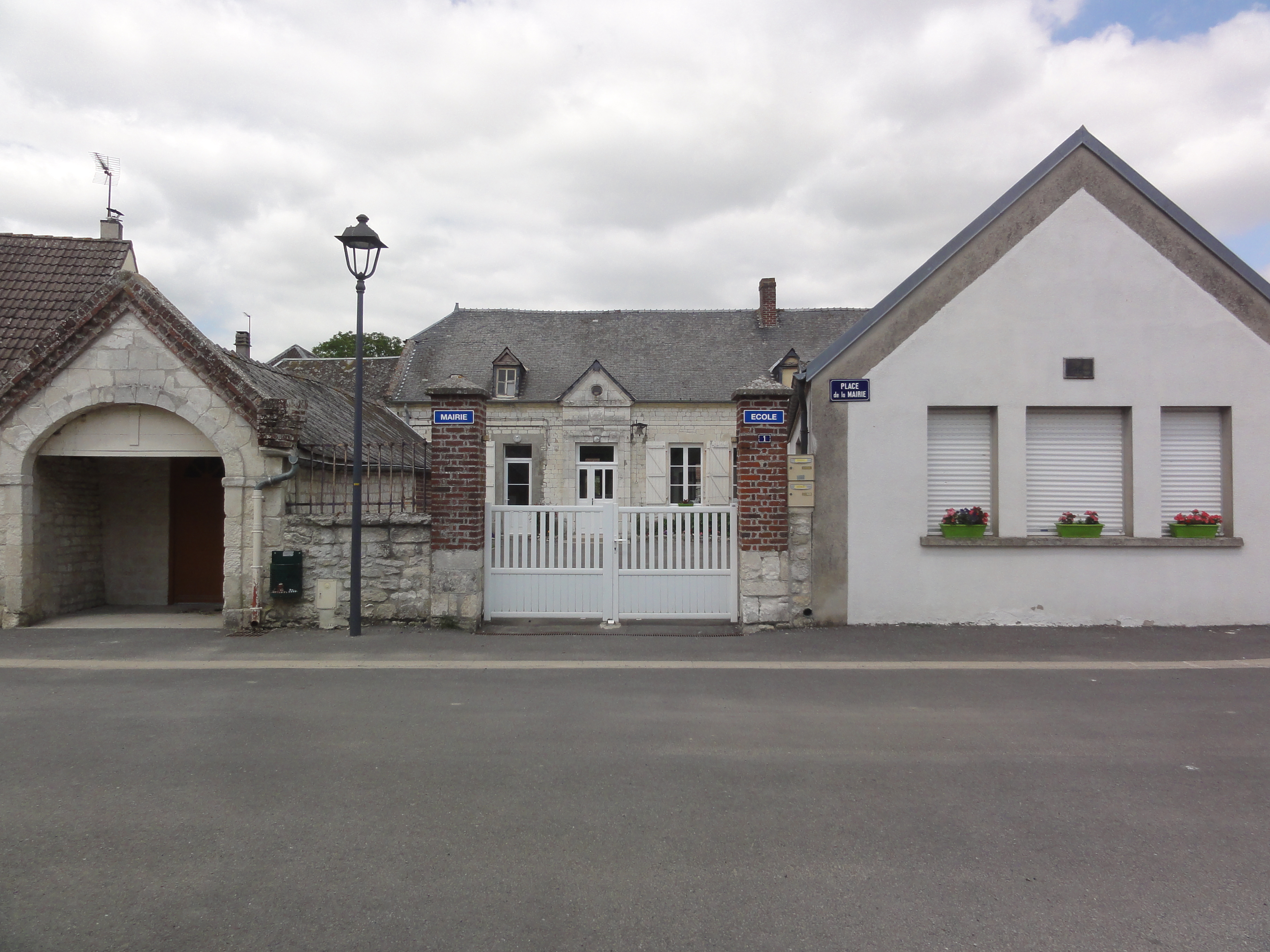
- The town hall and school of Goudelancourt-lès-Pierrepont
- Location of Goudelancourt-lès-Pierrepont
- Location within France Location within Hauts-de-France
- Coordinates: 49°40′11″N 3°51′20″E
- Country: France
- Region: Hauts-de-France
- Department: Aisne
- Arrondissement: Laon
- Canton: Villeneuve-sur-Aisne
- Intercommunality: Champagne Picarde

Government
  - Mayor (2026–32): Aline Charpentier
- Area^{1}: 8.73 km^{2} (3.37 sq mi)
- Elevation: 105 m (344 ft)
- Highest elevation: 135 m (443 ft)
- Lowest elevation: 82 m (269 ft)
- Population (2023): 140
  - Density: 16/km^{2} (42/sq mi)
- Time zone: UTC+01:00 (CET)
  - Summer (DST): UTC+02:00 (CEST)
- INSEE/Postal code: 02350 /02350
- ^{1} French Land Register data, which excludes lakes, ponds, glaciers > 1 km^{2} (0.386 sq mi or 247 acres) and river estuaries.

Goudelancourt-lès-Pierrepont (French pronunciation: [ɡudlɑ̃kuʁ lɛ pjɛʁpɔ̃], literally Goudelancourt near Pierrepont) is a commune in the Aisne department in Hauts-de-France in northern France.

== Population ==
Historical population
Year	Pop.	±% p.a.
1968	200	—
1975	157	−3.40%
1982	148	−0.84%
1990	129	−1.70%
1999	147	+1.46%
2007	127	−1.81%
2012	153	+3.80%
2017	135	−2.47%
2023	140	+0.61%
Source: INSEE

== See also ==
- Communes of the Aisne department
