= Beinheim =

- Commune
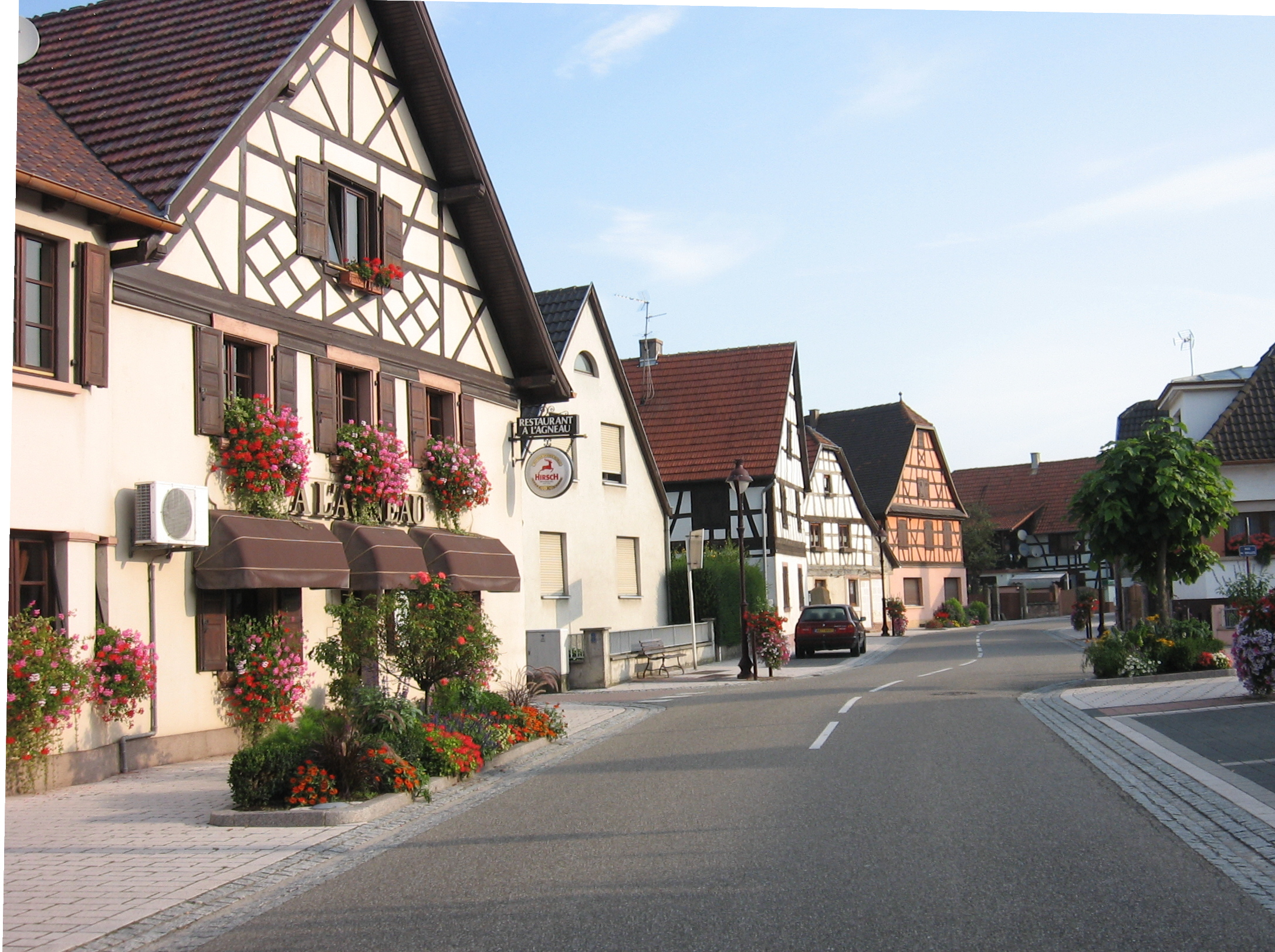
- Houses in Beinheim

- Coat of arms
- Location of Beinheim
- Location within France Location within Grand Est
- Coordinates: 48°51′50″N 8°05′05″E
- Country: France
- Region: Grand Est
- Department: Bas-Rhin
- Arrondissement: Haguenau-Wissembourg
- Canton: Wissembourg

Government
  - Mayor (2020–2026): Bernard Hentsch
- Area^{1}: 15.23 km^{2} (5.88 sq mi)
- Highest elevation: 121 m (397 ft)
- Lowest elevation: 111 m (364 ft)
- Population (2023): 1,883
  - Density: 123.6/km^{2} (320.2/sq mi)
- Time zone: UTC+01:00 (CET)
  - Summer (DST): UTC+02:00 (CEST)
- INSEE/Postal code: 67025 /67930
- ^{1} French Land Register data, which excludes lakes, ponds, glaciers > 1 km^{2} (0.386 sq mi or 247 acres) and river estuaries.

Beinheim (French pronunciation: [bainaim]; Alsatian: Bänem) is a commune in the Bas-Rhin department in Grand Est in the Alsace region of northeastern France.

== Geography ==
Beinheim lies on the A35 autoroute between Roppenheim and Seltz. It is about 50 kilometres north of Strasbourg, near the German border.

== History ==
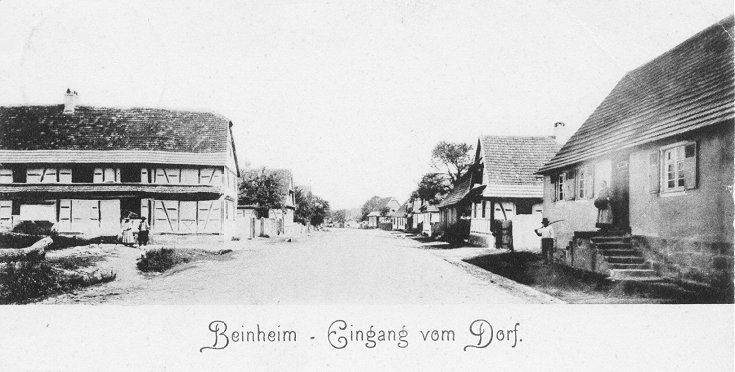
Street view circa 1905

In 884, Beinheim belonged to the Abbey of Honau, and is mentioned as such (as "Beinenheim") in a document of Charles the Fat. As a former landgrave city with a castle, by the 15th century, Beinheim was no longer head of the Riet.

In 1255, Beinheim belonged to the baron of Fleckenstein, who sold it to the margrave of Bade in 1402 or 1404. The margrave later introduced religious reform, which did not gain much of a hold. In 1497 the margrave sold Beinheim to the Count Palatine. In 1557 the count sold it back to the margrave, who maintained possession until the French Revolution. The castle was demolished in 1687.

== Politics ==
Bernard Hentsch was elected mayor in 2001 and has held the position since then, re-elected most recently in 2020. Beinheim has 19 municipal councillors.

== Population ==
Historical population
Year	Pop.	±% p.a.
1968	1,059	—
1975	1,268	+2.61%
1982	1,457	+2.00%
1990	1,556	+0.83%
1999	1,790	+1.57%
2007	1,894	+0.71%
2012	1,873	−0.22%
2017	1,875	+0.02%
2023	1,883	+0.07%
Source: INSEE

== Notable people ==
- Jean Adam Schramm, French lieutenant-general during the Revolution and Empire was born and died in Beinheim.
- François Bracci, French international association football player was born on 31 October 1951 in Beinheim.

== Buildings and monuments ==
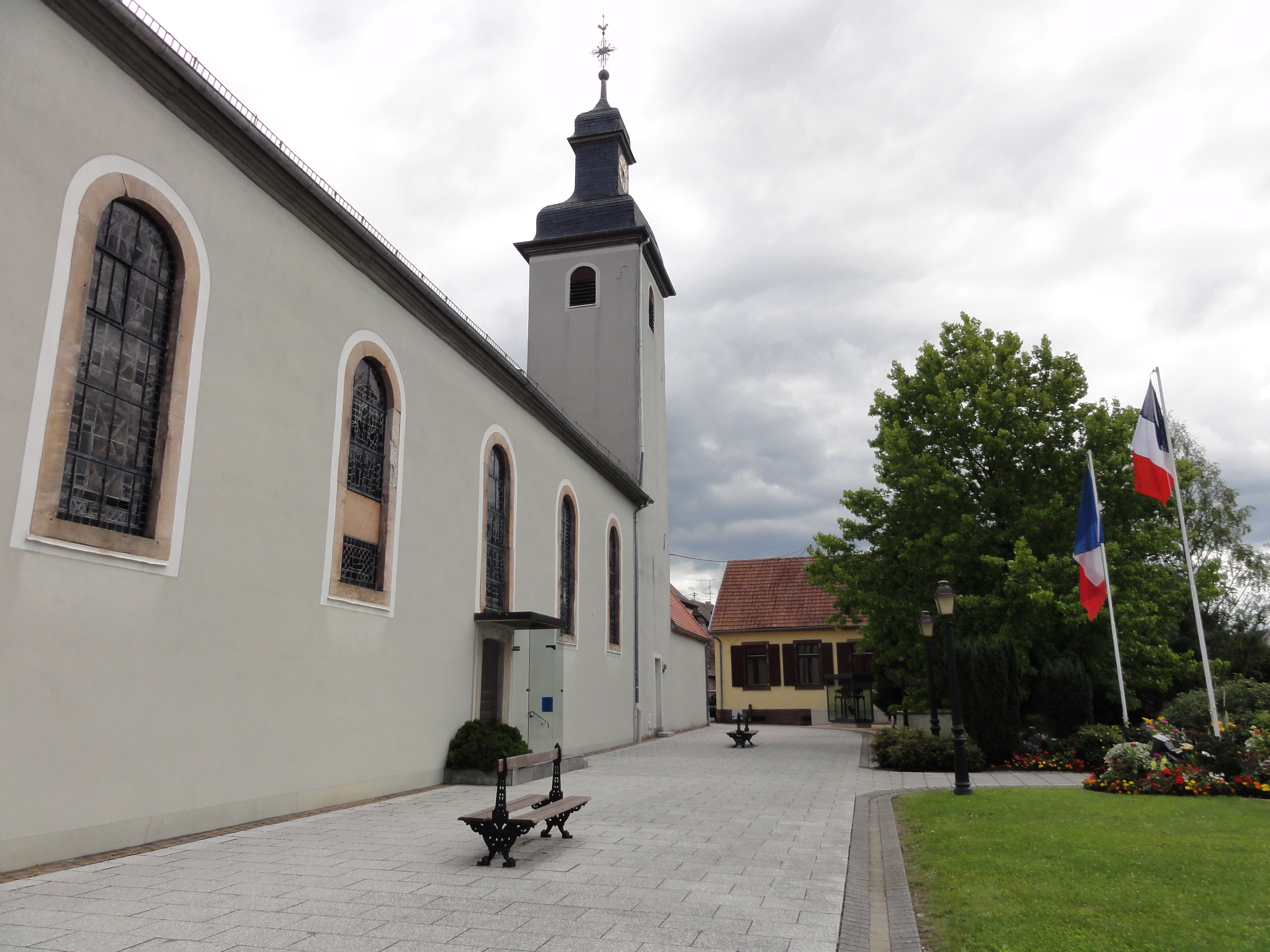
Sainte-Croix church

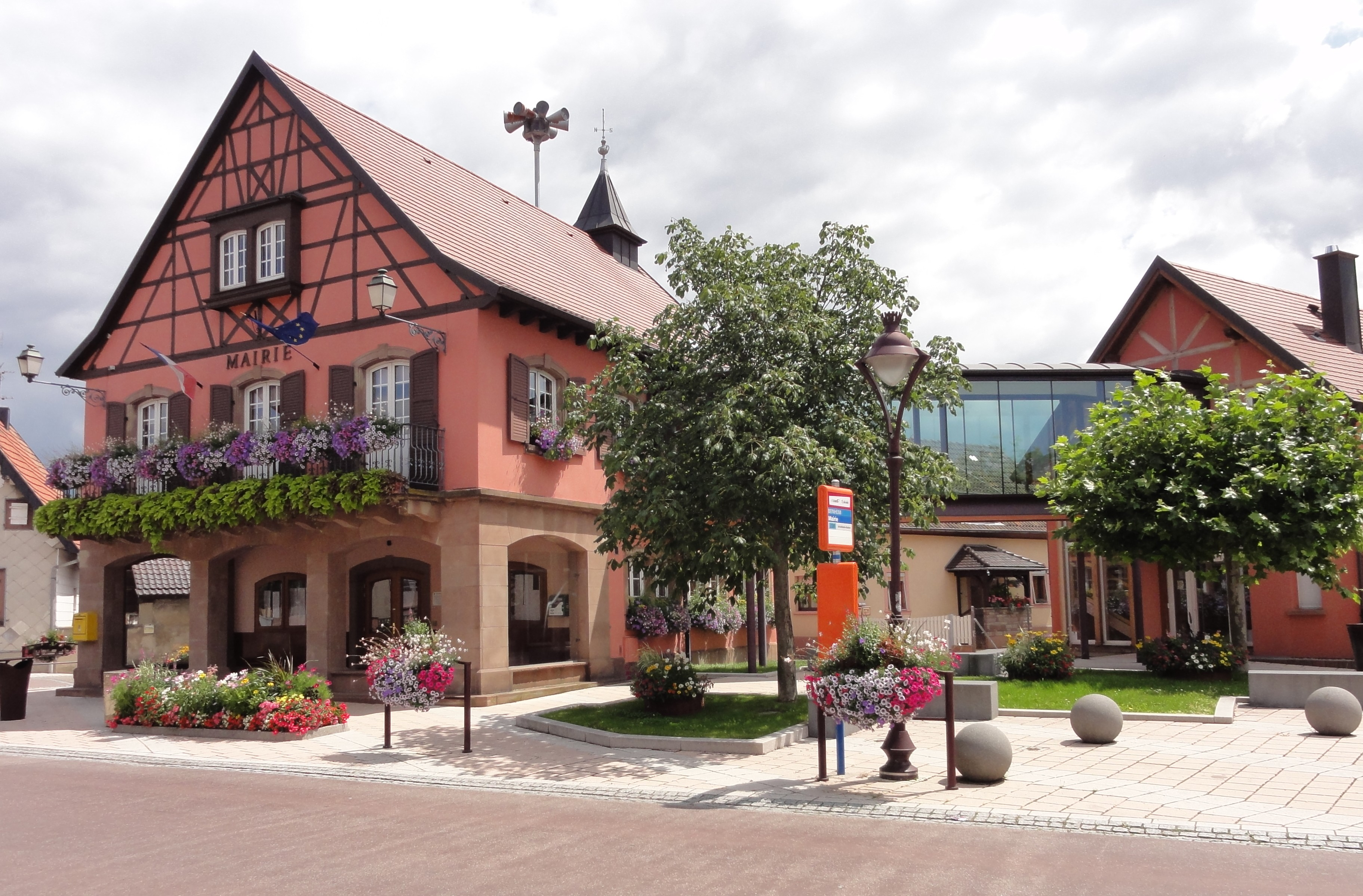
Town hall

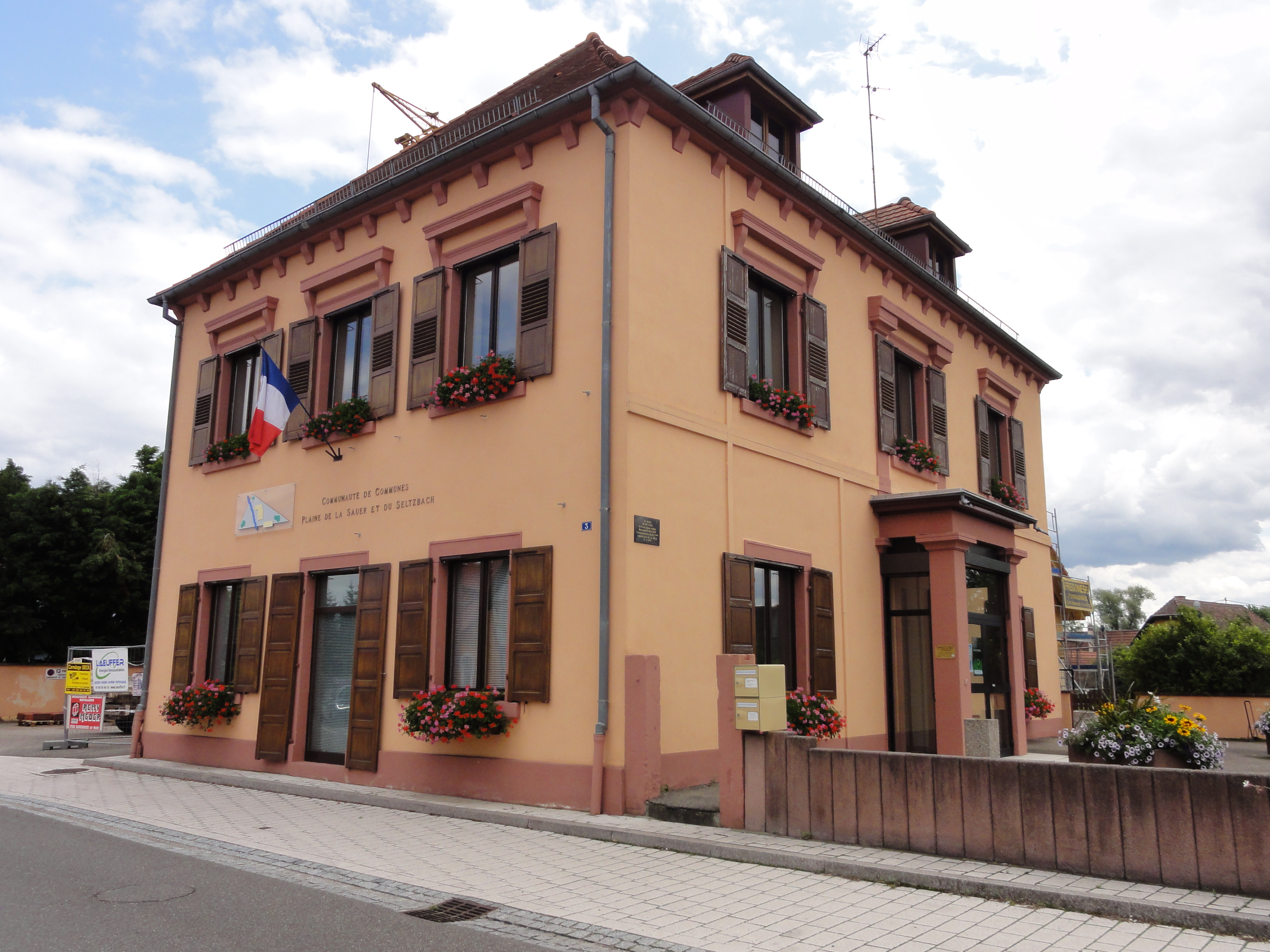
General Schramm's château

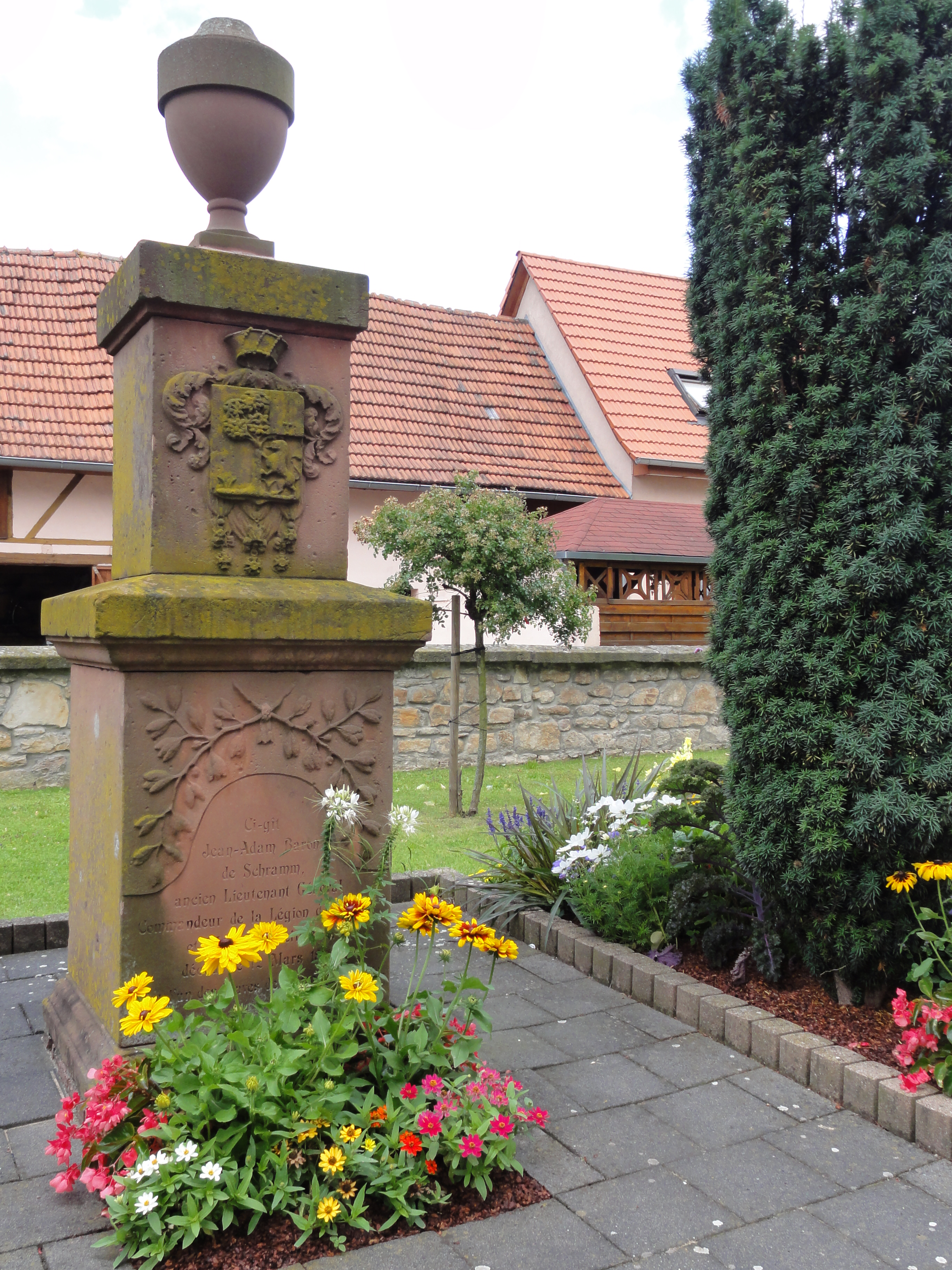
General Schramm's tomb

== See also ==
- Communes of the Bas-Rhin department
