= Léon Lejeal =

French historian, Americanist, and academic officer (1832–1902)

- Born: October 21, 1862; Arras
- Died: June 29, 1907 (aged 45); Châteauroux
- Occupations: Historian, Americanist, Academic officer

Academic work
- Discipline: Americanist

Léon Lejeal (full name Léon Alexandre Gustave Lejeal) was a French historian and Americanist. Despite dying at the young age of 45, he had a significant influence on Americanist studies in France, especially as an instructor at the Collège de France, and in various academic roles including Secretary General at the Société des Américanistes.

== Teaching ==
Lejeal was born in Arras, in 1862. He would serve as a professor of history in Dole, Boulogne-sur-Mer, and Melun. Among other works he wrote a work on the geography of Boulogne.

In 1902, Lejeal was awarded a position at the prestigious Collège de France, his full title being Chargé du cours supplémentaire d'antiquités américaines au Collège de France (Lecturer in American antiquities at the Collège de France). There was considerable controversy among the members of the Collège, as transcribed in the minutes of their meeting regarding the appointment. Aside from a previously published overview of Americanist studies in France, Lejeal had few bylines to support his appointment. Albert Réville, in particular, opined that there were "more distinguished Americanists in France" than Lejeal.

Nonetheless, given that the position had been endowed by the Société's wealthy honorary president, Joseph Florimond Loubat, the Duke of Loubat, the appointment went forward. Lejeal's opening lecture was entitled L'archéologie américaine et les études américanistes en France (American Archaeology and Americanist Studies in France). It reviewed French contributions to Americanist studies.

Summaries of those courses were published in the Annuaires du Collège de France, detailing Lejeal's teachings on a broad range of topics in American studies, including especially research on Mexican languages and cultures:

- 1901–1902: Amérique préhistorique — Prehistoric America
- 1902–1903: Sources espagnoles de l'histoire précolombienne — Spanish Sources for Pre-Columbian History
- 1903–1904: Le Pérou ancien d'après les historiens espagnols et les travaux de l'exploration contemporaine — Ancient Peru According to Spanish Historians and the Work of Contemporary Exploration; Historiographie monastique de l'ancien Mexique — Monastic Historiography of Ancient Mexico
- 1904–1905: Sahagun, historien de l'antiquité mexicaine — Sahagún, Historian of Mexican Antiquity
- 1906–1907: Eléments de la grammaire mexicaine avec explications de textes historiques et religieux — Elements of Mexican Grammar, with Explanations of Historical and Religious Texts; La Magie, l'Astrologie et la Sorcellerie dans l'antiquité américaine, spécialement au Mexique et au Pérou — Magic, Astrology, and Sorcery in American Antiquity, Especially in Mexico and Peru

== Career ==
Earlier in his career Lejeal published several works in Geography. He was a contributor to the Bulletin de géographie historique et descriptive, the Bulletin critique, the Revue des Études historiques.

In his various roles at the Société des Americanistes, Lejeal wrote few long works, apart from a bibliography of Mexican and Central American archaeology., although he did contribute 58 short contributions to the Journal de la Société des Américanistes. These included summaries of exhibits at the Musée d'Ethnographie du Trocadéro, various reviews (e.g., of Sigismund Ernst Richard Krone), and necrologies.

Lejeal represented the College de France as delegate at numerous international conferences, including the Congrès internationale des Americanistes in New York in 1902 (where he accompanied other scholars on an excursion to Fort Ancient in Ohio), in Stuttgart in 1904, and in Quebec in 1906, among others.

== Death ==
Lejeal died at the young age of 45, probably of a stroke.

In his obituary for Lejeal, his colleague Henri Froidevaux characterized him as an indispensable and industrious officer behind the scenes of the management and organization of the Société des Americanistes, and that his absence would be sharply felt.

The scale of the Americanist library he had amassed by the time of his death — some 350 volumes — was catalogued for sale by K.W. Hiersemann in 1908.
