= Theodor Oswald Weigel =

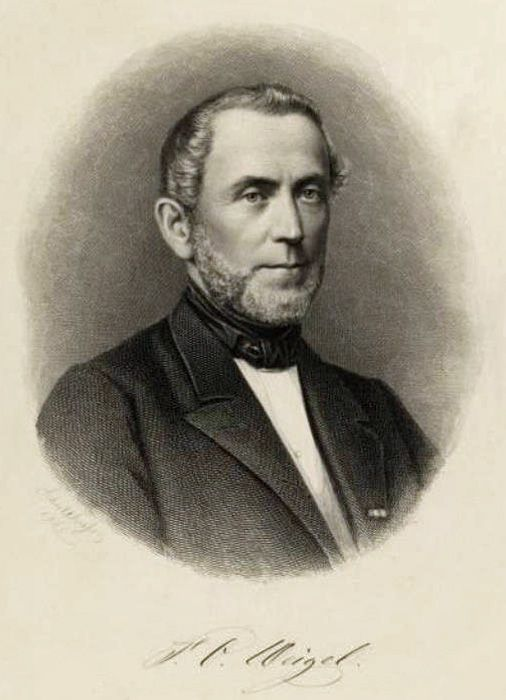
Theodor Oswald Weigel (1865)

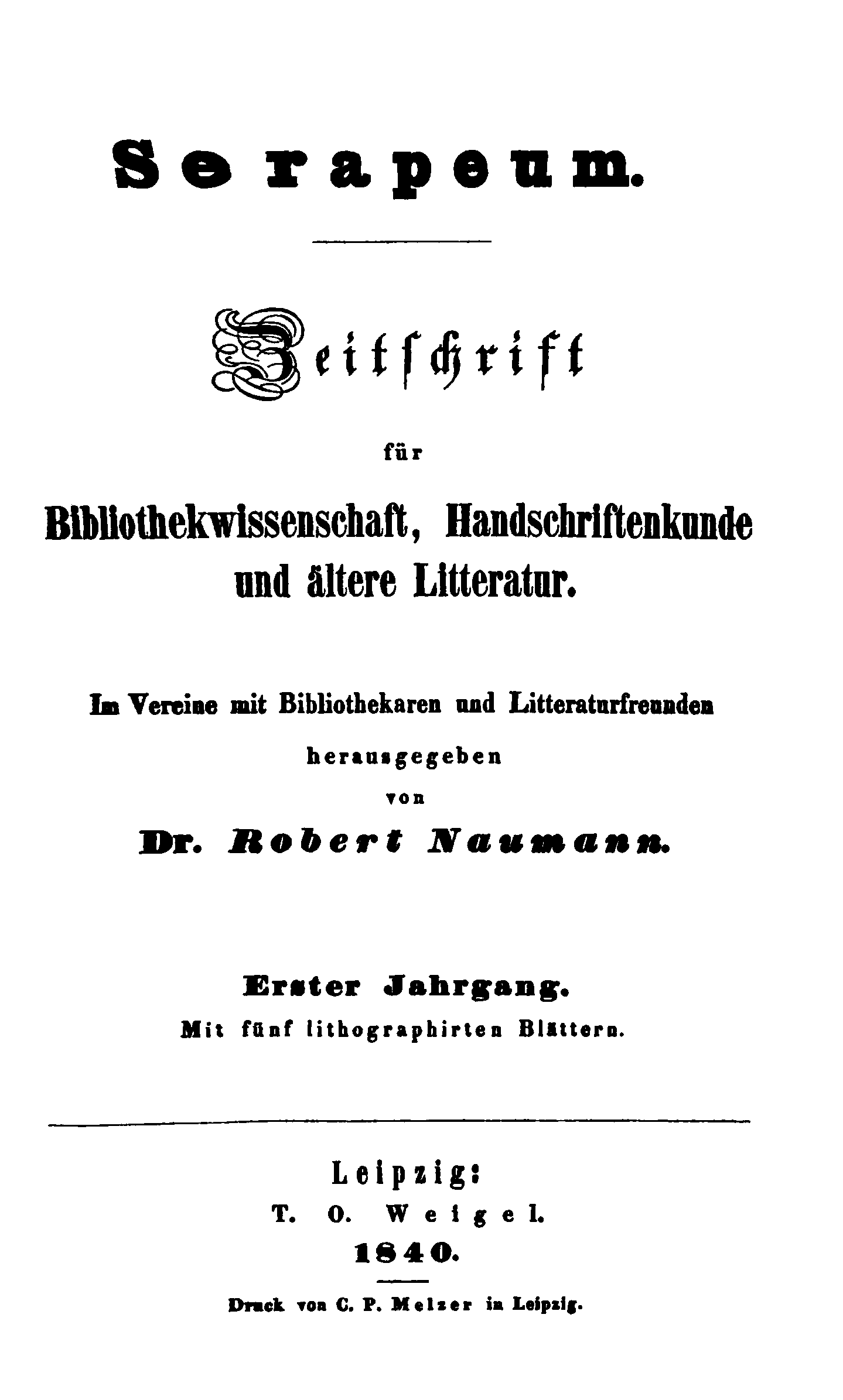
Title page of Serapeum

Theodor Oswald Weigel (born 5 August 1812 in Leipzig – Died 2 July 1881 in Hosterwitz) was a German bookseller, art dealer, auctioneer, and publisher.

== Life ==
Weigel was the youngest son of the bookseller, auctioneer, and publisher Johann August Gottlob Weigel (1773–1846). In 1839 he took over his father's business at the Silberner Bär in Leipzig and he ran it under his own name, T. O. Weigel. He expanded the publishing program, particularly in the fields of history, theology, and the natural sciences.

Weigel published Serapeum: Zeitschrift für Bibliothekwissenschaft, Handschriftenkunde und ältere Litteratur, edited by Robert Naumann. Founded in 1840, it was the first German journal devoted to library science.

Weigel built up a considerable collection of medieval manuscripts and miniatures. It came into possession of Karl Wilhelm Hiersemann, who sold the collection.

His son Felix Oswald Weigel (1848–1905) took over the firm in 1881 but sold the publishing house to Christian Hermann Tauchnitz (1816–1895) in 1888. He continued the antiquarian bookselling business under the name Oswald Weigel.

Weigel was buried in Section VIII of the Neuer Johannisfriedhof cemetery in Leipzig.

== Publications ==
- Album von Autographen zur zweihundertjährigen Gedächtnißfeier (am 24. October 1848) des westphälischen Friedensschlusses am (24. October 1648). Mit 47 Tafeln Facsimiles und 24 Portraits in Holzschnitt. Weigel, Lpz., 1849^{1}, (Digitalisat).
- Verzeichniss der xylographischen Bücher des 15. Jahrhunderts, Leipzig 1856
- Katalog einer Sammlung illustrierter Manuscripte und Miniaturen auf Einzelblaettern aus dem Besitze von T. O. Weigel
- Katalog frühester Erzeugnisse der Druckerkunst der T[heodor] O[swald] Weigelʹschen Sammlung. Leipzig 1872
