= Hôtel de Ville, Arras =

Town hall in Arras, France

Hôtel de Ville
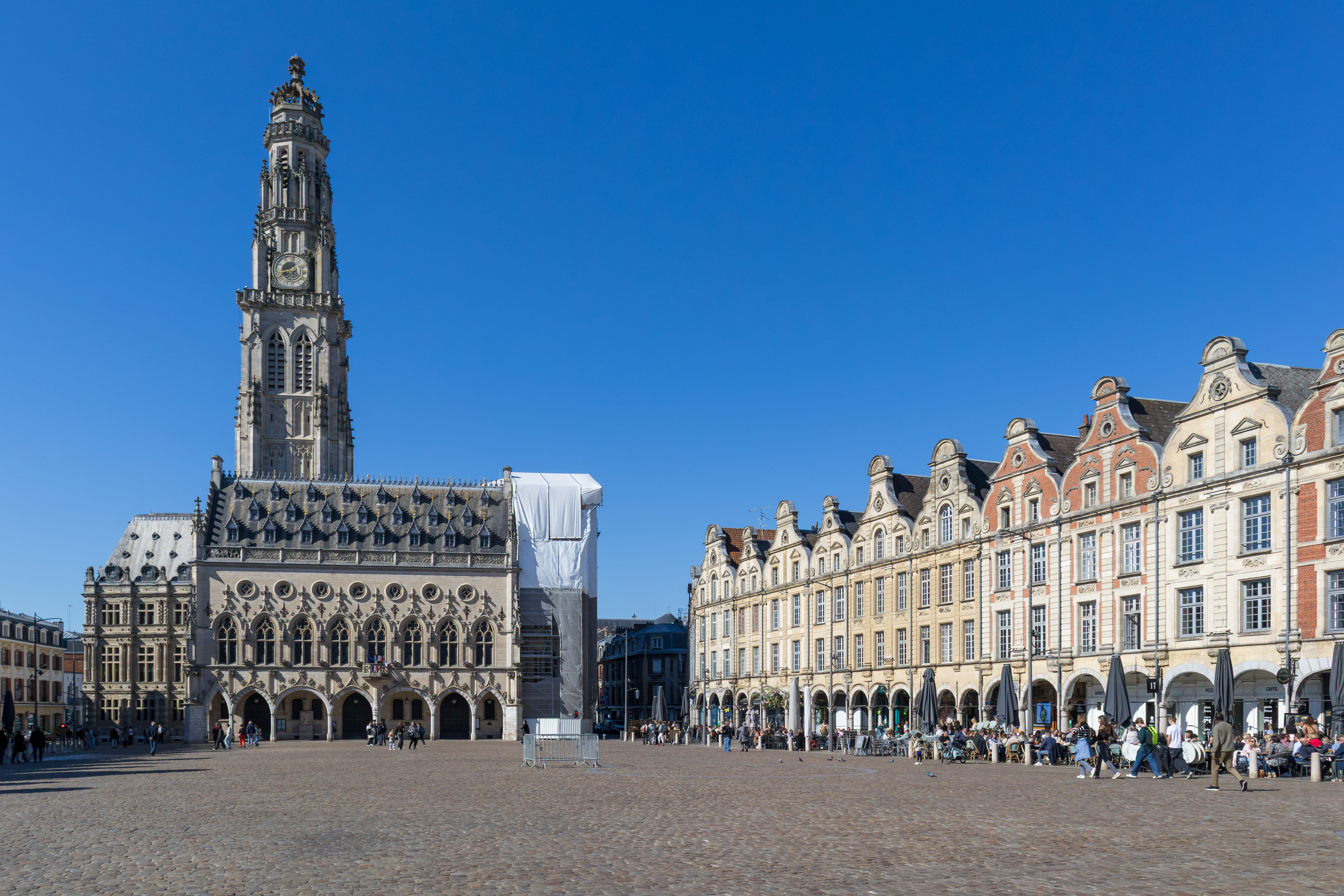
- Main frontage of the Hôtel de Ville

General information
- Type: City hall
- Architectural style: Gothic style Renaissance Revival style
- Location: Arras, France
- Coordinates: 50.2911°N 2.7772°E
- Completed: 1517; 1867 (restoration); 1920s (reconstruction)

Height
- Height: 75 metres (246 ft)

Design and construction
- Architects: Pierre Paquet (reconstruction)

UNESCO World Heritage Site
- Part of: Belfries of Belgium and France
- Criteria: Cultural: ii, iv
- Reference: 943
- Inscription: 1999 (23rd Session)

Monument historique
- Official name: Hôtel de ville
- Type: Inscrit
- Designated: 1921
- Reference no.: PA00107978

The Hôtel de Ville (French pronunciation: [otɛl də vil], City Hall) is a historic building in Arras, Pas-de-Calais, northern France, standing at the northwest end of the Place Des Heros in the centre of the town, and its bell-tower representing the main landmark in the town. It was designated a monument historique by the French government in 1921.

== History ==
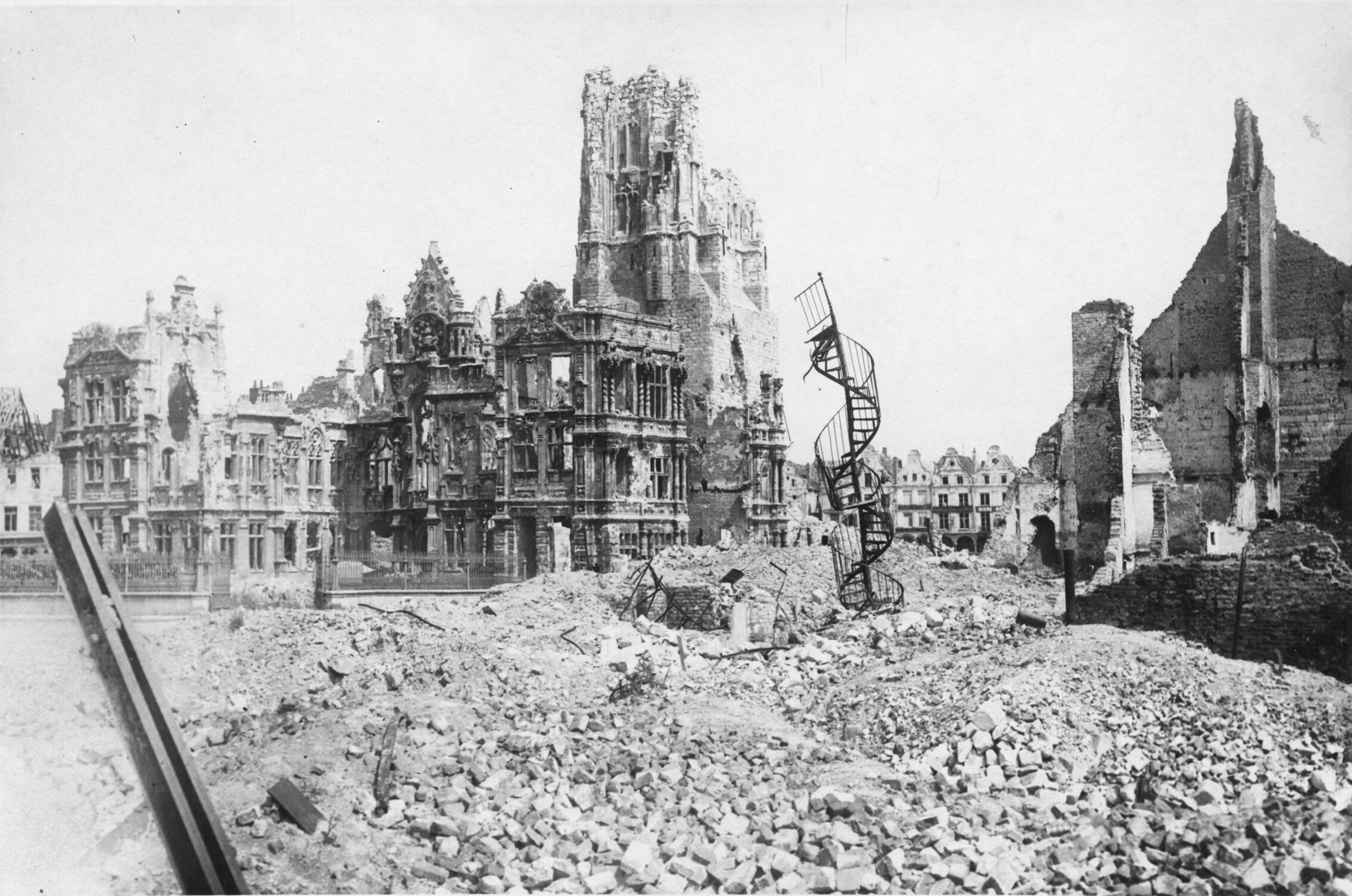
The building in ruins during the First World War

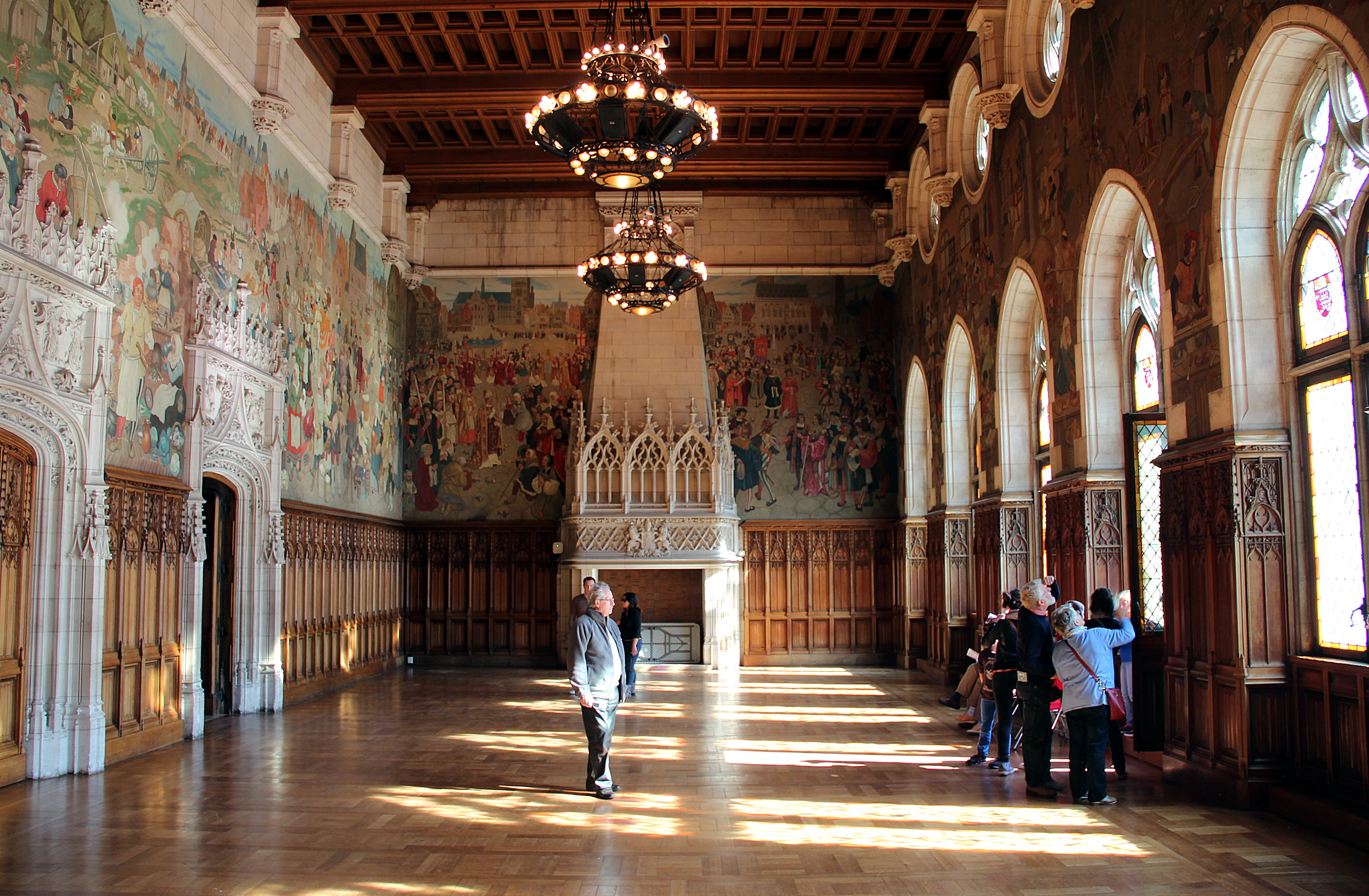
Assembly hall of the Arras town hall

After one of the councillors observed, in the early 16th century, that an earlier town hall was dilapidated, the council agreed to commission a new town hall for Arras. The site they selected was on the northwest side of the Place Des Heros. The new building was designed in the Gothic style, built in ashlar stone and was completed in 1517. The design involved a symmetrical main frontage facing onto the Place Des Heros. The ground floor was arcaded with seven pointed arches of unequal spans, while the first floor was fenestrated by eight pointed windows with seven roundels above. There was a bell-tower, which was 75 metres (246 ft) high behind. The roof incorporated three rows of dormer windows and was covered in slate. The design was inspired by the architecture of the Hôtel de Ville in Saint-Quentin.

An extension in the form a pavilion, designed by Artésien Mathias Tesson in the Renaissance Revival style, was added behind the original structure in 1572.

The building was restored in the mid-19th century, and re-dedicated by Emperor Napoleon III on 26 August 1867. The artist, Gustave Louis Jaulmes, painted a fine mural for the Salle du Mariages (wedding room) in 1911.

The building was then almost completely destroyed by German artillery on 7 October 1914 during the First World War and rebuilt during the 1920s, to a design by Pierre Paquet, using some modern materials where practicable. This can most obviously be seen inside the tower, where the main supporting structure is concrete. The sculptor, Pierre Seguin, was selected in 1924 to create the ornaments on the façade of the building as well as a stone fireplace and 132 carved oak panels.

Following the liberation of Arras by troops of the British Second Army, commanded by Lieutenant General Miles Dempsey, on 3 September 1944, during the Second World War, the chairman of the Provisional Government of the French Republic, General Charles de Gaulle, visited the town and, accompanied by the mayor, René Méric, gave a speech from the balcony of the town hall on 1 October 1944.

In 2005, the belfry was added to the UNESCO World Heritage List as part of the Belfries of Belgium and France site because of its architecture and historical importance in maintaining municipal power in Europe.

== Tunnels ==
Tunnels called boves were dug to exploit the white chalk under the city in the 9th century. These tunnels were used by 24,000 British soldiers to prepare for the Battle of Arras in 1917, during the First World War, and by French residents as protection from enemy bombing, during the Second World War. These are accessible from the basement of the building.

== Sources ==
- Colin, Maurice; Godin, Alexandre (1855). Notice historique sur le beffroi et l'hôtel-de-ville d'Arras. Arras: Typographie d'Auguste Tierny.
- Enlart, Camille (1916). Arras avant la guerre. Paris: H. Laurens.
- Le Gentil, Constant (1877). Old Arras, its suburbs, its surroundings: archaeological and historical memories. Arras: Eugène Bradier.
- Pharaon, Florian (1867). Voyage impérial dans le nord de la France: Août 26-27-28-29-30. L. Danel.
