= Arras =

Prefecture and commune in Hauts-de-France, France

Arras Aros (Picard)
- Prefecture and commune
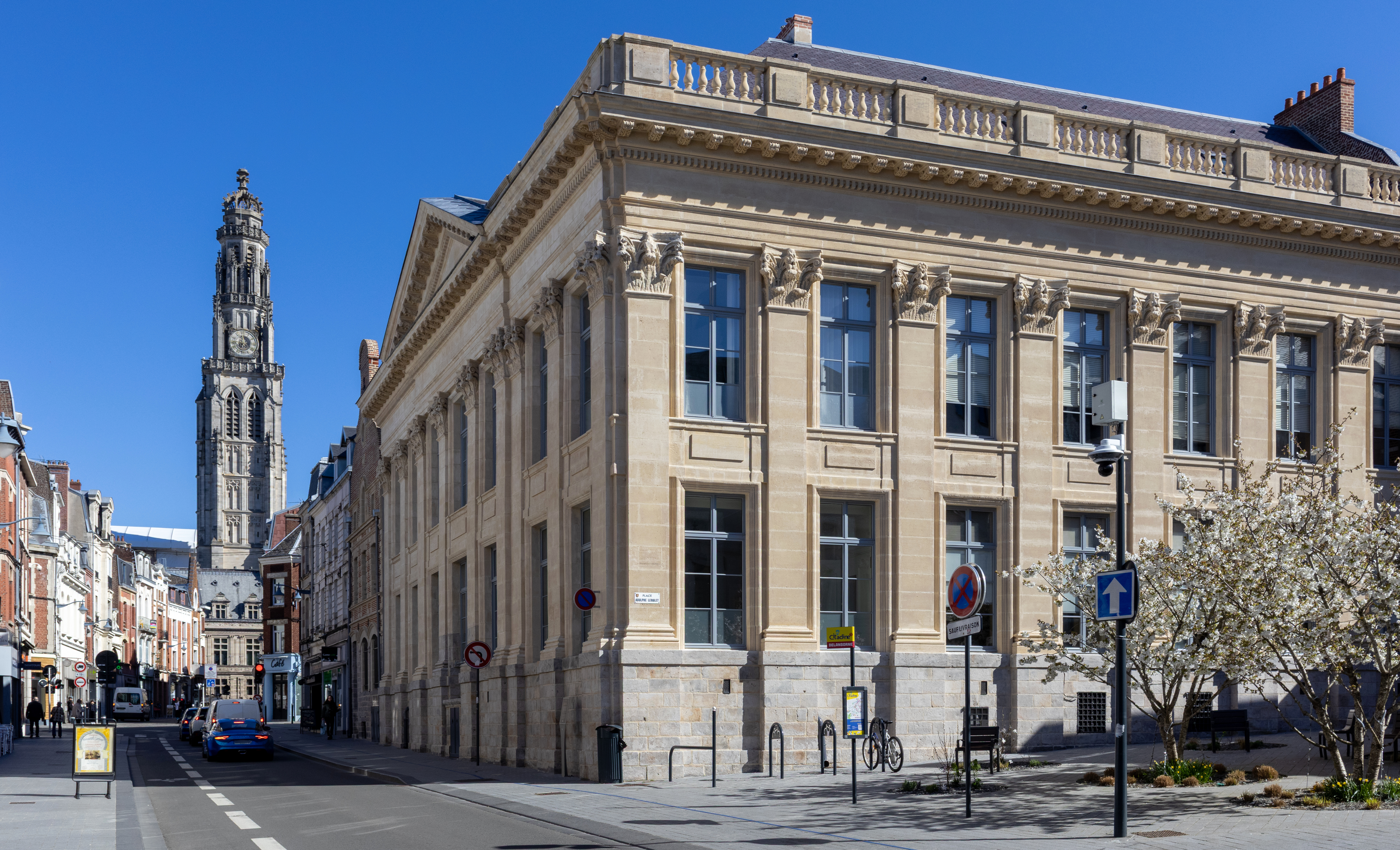
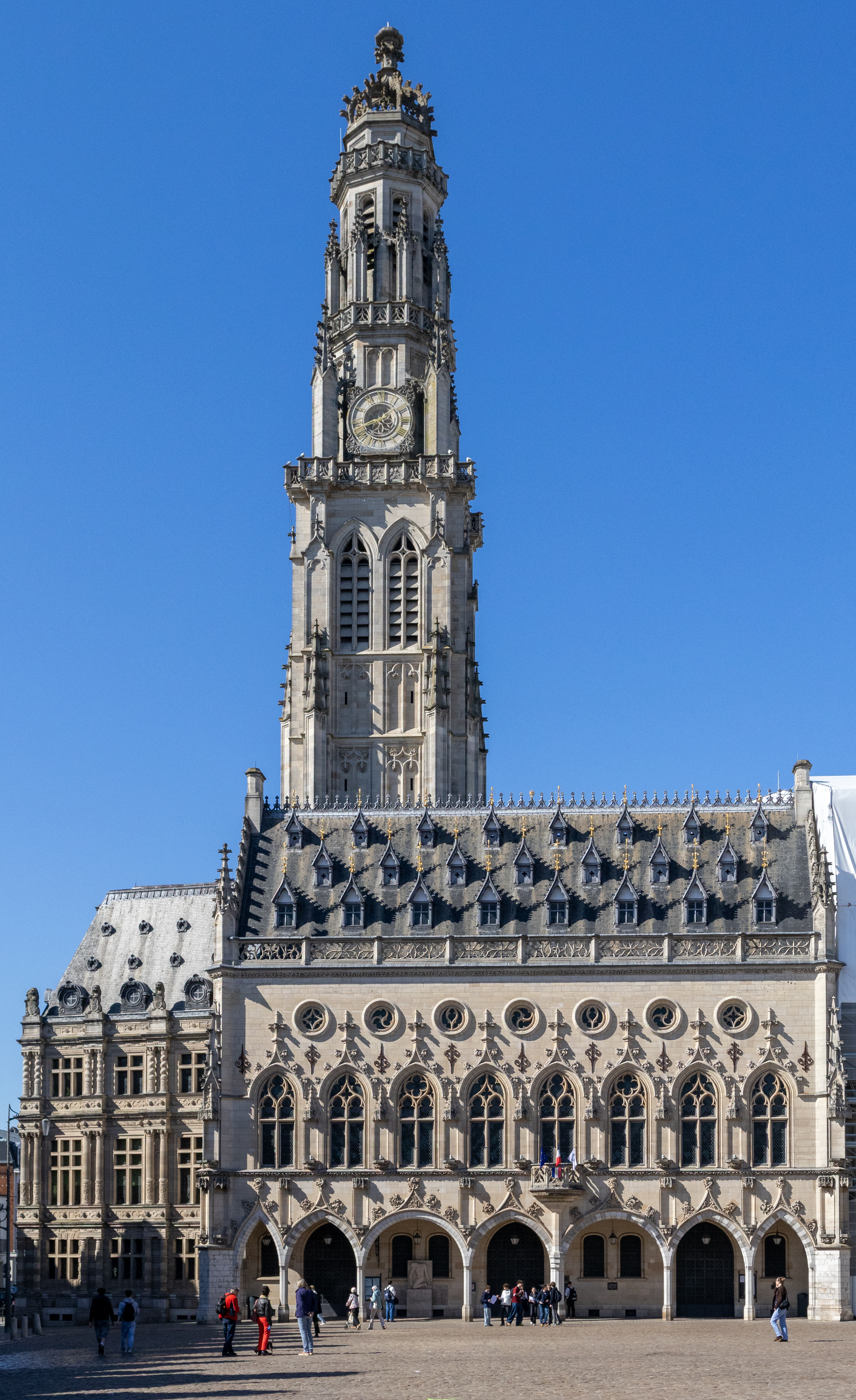
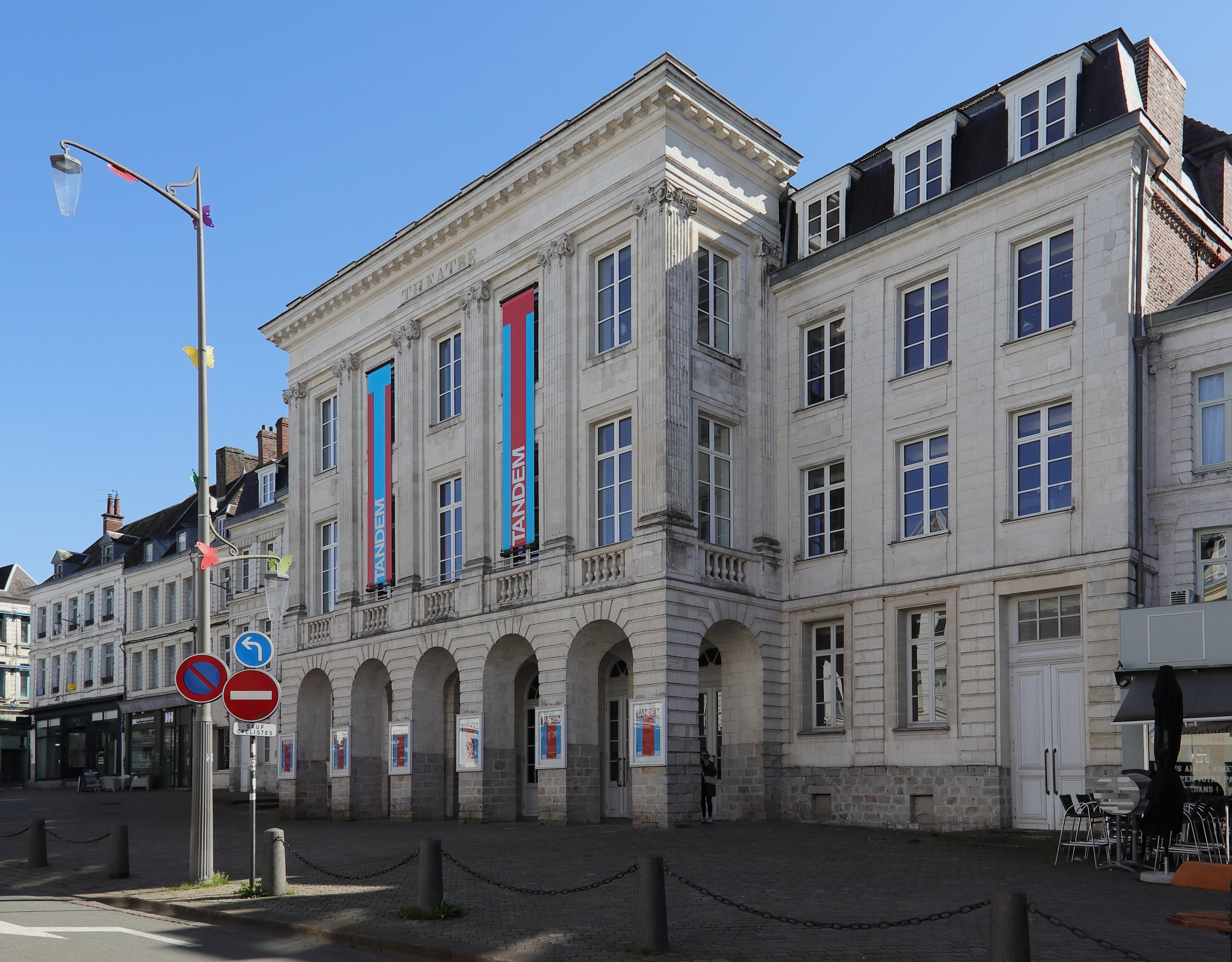
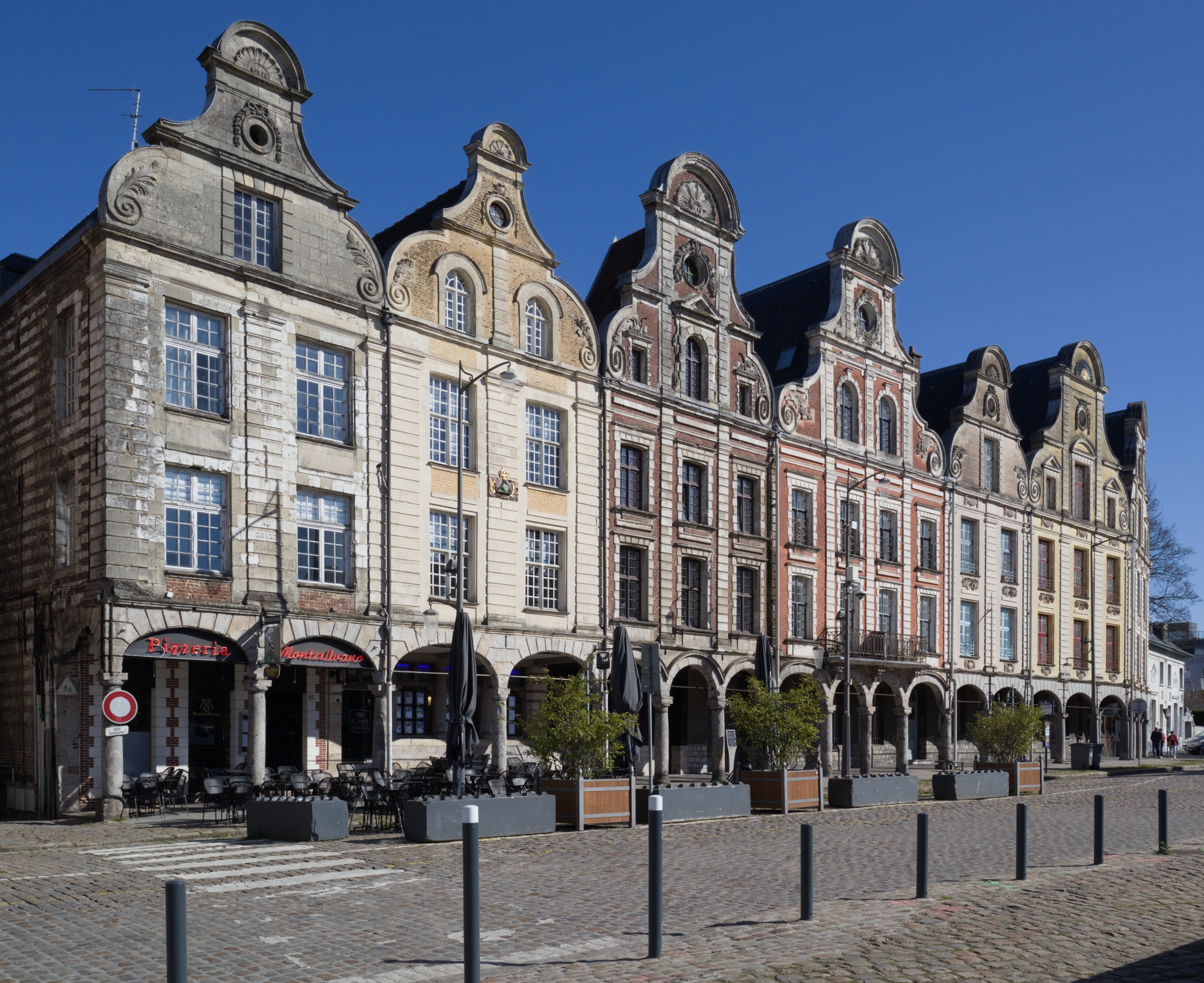
- From top to bottom: The Palace of the Estates of Artois and the belfry, the Town Hall and the belfry, the Theatre, facades of the Grand Place

- Coat of arms

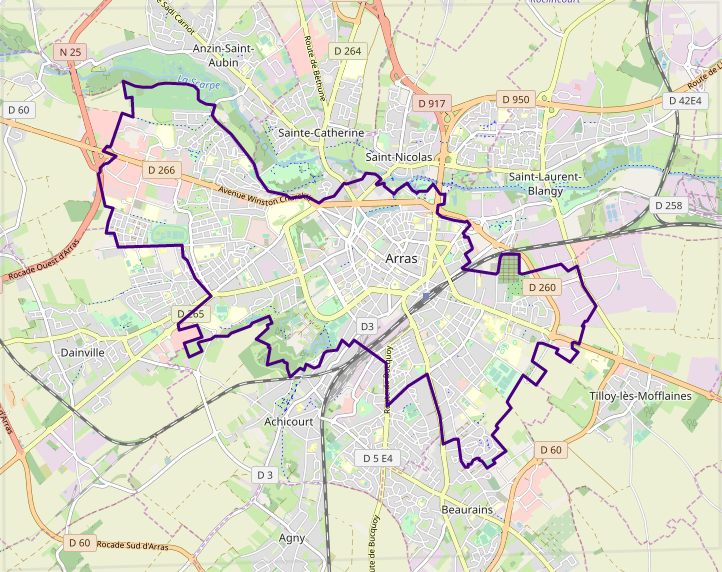
- Location of Arras
- Location within France Location within Hauts-de-France
- Coordinates: 50°17′31″N 2°46′48″E
- Country: France
- Region: Hauts-de-France
- Department: Pas-de-Calais
- Arrondissement: Arras
- Canton: Arras-1; Arras-2; Arras-3
- Intercommunality: CU d'Arras

Government
  - Mayor (2026–32): Frédéric Leturque
- Area^{1}: 11.63 km^{2} (4.49 sq mi)
- Elevation: 72 m (236 ft)
- Highest elevation: 99 m (325 ft)
- Lowest elevation: 52 m (171 ft)
- Population (2023): 42,875
  - Density: 3,687/km^{2} (9,548/sq mi)
- Time zone: UTC+01:00 (CET)
  - Summer (DST): UTC+02:00 (CEST)
- INSEE/Postal code: 62041 /62000
- ^{1} French Land Register data, which excludes lakes, ponds, glaciers > 1 km^{2} (0.386 sq mi or 247 acres) and river estuaries.

Arras (/ˈærəs/ ARR-əs; French: [aʁɑs]; Picard: Aros; historical Dutch: Atrecht [ˈaːtrɛxt]) is the prefecture of the Pas-de-Calais department, which forms part of the region of Hauts-de-France; before the reorganization of 2014 it was in Nord-Pas-de-Calais. The historic centre of the Artois region, with a Baroque town square, Arras is in northern France at the confluence of the rivers Scarpe and Crinchon.

The Arras plain is on a large chalk plateau bordered on the north by the Marqueffles fault, on the southwest by the Artois and Ternois hills, and on the south by the slopes of Beaufort-Blavincourt. On the east it is connected to the Scarpe valley.

Saint Vedast (or St. Vaast) was the first Catholic bishop in the year 499 and tried to eliminate paganism among the Franks. By 843, Arras was seat of the County of Artois which became part of the Royal domain in 1191. The first mention of the name Arras appeared in the 12th century. Some hypothesize it is a contraction of Atrebates, a Belgic tribe of Gaul and Britain that used to inhabit the area. The name Atrebates could have successively evolved to become Atrades, Atradis, Aras, and finally Arras. Others believe it comes from the Celtic word Ar, meaning 'running water', as the Scarpe river flows through Arras or simply the name of Abraham's wife Sarra spelled backwards.

Arras is Pas-de-Calais' second most populous town after Calais. The town counted 42,621 residents in 2022, with the Arras metropolitan area having a population of 159,719. Arras is located 182 kilometres (113 miles) north of Paris and can be reached in 2 hours by car and in 50 minutes by TGV. It is the historic centre of the former Artois province. Its local speech is characterized as a patois. The city of Arras is well known for its architecture, culture, and history. It was once part of the Spanish Netherlands, a portion of the Low Countries controlled by Spain from 1556 to 1714. Louis XIII conquered Arras in 1640; the town officially became part of France in 1659.

Arras attracts thousands of visitors every year, who commonly explore the city's architecture and historic buildings. Some attractions include the Town Hall and its Belfry (listed as a UNESCO World Heritage Site since 15 July 2005), the "Boves" (a maze 10 metres (33 feet) beneath the city), the Squares (La Place des Héros and La Grand'Place), the Art District (the Theatre of Arras and the Hôtel de Guînes), the Abbey District (The Saint-Vaast Abbey and the Cathedral of Arras), the Vauban Citadel, and the Nemetacum site (the ancient town founded by the Romans 2000 years ago). The Canadian National Vimy Memorial is just outside the town.

== History ==
=== Prehistory ===
Archaeologists found evidence of prehistoric human settlements in the Scarpe basin. The archaeological sites of Mont-Saint-Vaast in Arras and Biache-Saint-Vaast were Stone Age settlements of the Mousterian culture. They were evidenced by the finds of stone tools. These tools show signs of the Levallois technique, a name given by archaeologists to a distinctive type of stone knapping, developed by forerunners to modern humans during the Paleolithic period 170,000 years ago.

Very little was found to document the Bronze Age and Early Iron Age in the Arras area.

=== Antiquity/Foundation ===
Arras was founded on the hill of Baudimont by the Belgic tribe of the Atrebates, who named it Nemetocenna in reference to a nemeton that probably existed there.

In the Scarpe valley, archaeologists' excavations and data recovery revealed Late Iron Age settlements. These buildings, believed to be farms, were found near the municipalities of Arras, Hamblain-les-Prés and Saint-Pol.

The town was later renamed Nemetacum/Atrebatum by the Romans, under whom it became an important garrison town. No traces of any amenities such as a forum, theatre, or basilica have been identified. One discovery has been "one of the rare sanctuaries devoted to the oriental god Attis in France".

=== Medieval and early modern period ===
==== Before the Middle Ages ====
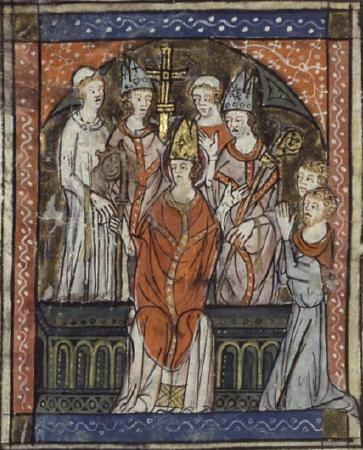
The ordination of Saint Vaast

In the 4th century, Nemetacum was renowned for its arts and crafts as well as textiles trade throughout the whole empire. Between 406 and 407, the city was taken and destroyed by Germanic invaders. In 428, the Salian Franks led by Clodion le Chevelu took control of the region including the current Somme department. Roman General Aetius then chose to negotiate for peace and concluded a treaty (fœdus) with Clodion that gave the Franks the status of «foederati» fighting for Rome.

The town's people were converted to Christianity in the late 4th century by Saint Innocent, who was killed in 410 during a barbarian attack on the town. In 499, after the conversion of Clovis I to Catholicism, a diocese (évêché in French) was created in Arras, the Roman Catholic Diocese of Arras, and given to Saint Vaast (also known as Saint Vedast in English), who remains the diocesan patron saint. Saint Vaast then established an episcopal see and a monastic community. It was suppressed in 580 to found the Roman Catholic Diocese of Cambrai, from which it would reemerge 5 centuries later.

==== Early Middle Ages ====
In 667 Saint Aubert, bishop of Cambrai, decided to found the Abbey of Saint Vaast, which developed during the Carolingian period into an immensely wealthy Benedictine abbey. The modern town of Arras initially spread around the abbey as a grain market. During the 9th century, both town and abbey suffered from the attacks of the Vikings, who later settled to the west in Normandy. The abbey revived its strength in the 11th century and played an important role in the development of medieval painting, successfully synthesizing the artistic styles of Carolingian, Ottonian and English art.

==== High Middle Ages ====
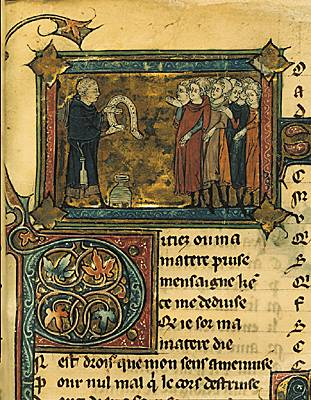
"Li congié" by Jean Bodel, a trouvère that lived in Arras in the 12th century

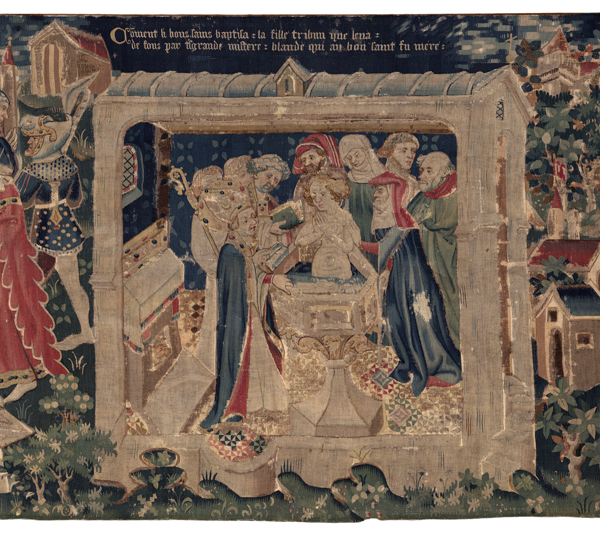
Fragment of the tapestry The history of St. Piatus and Eleuterius from 1402 (Treasury of Tournai Cathedral). The only surviving tapestry that is known with certainty to have been woven in Arras.

In 1025, a Catholic council was held at Arras against certain Manichaean (dualistic) heretics who rejected the sacraments of the Church. In 1093, the bishopric of Arras was refounded on territory split from the Diocese of Cambrai. In 1097 two councils, presided over by Lambert of Arras, dealt with questions concerning monasteries and persons consecrated to God. In this time, Arras became an important cultural centre, especially for the group of poets who came to be known as trouvères. One particular society of such poets was later called the Puy d'Arras.

==== The wool industry and trade ====
The town was granted a commercial charter by the French crown in 1180 and became an internationally important location for banking and trade. The wool industry of Arras, established in the 4th century, became of great importance during the Middle Ages. Already in the 3rd century Romans had lauded the quality of wool from Tournai and Arras. By the 11th century Arras was the leading city and trading hub of the wool industry. This prominence would eventually shift towards areas north of Arras, and cities such as Lille, Douai and Saint-Omer, followed by Ypres and eventually Bruges and Ghent would become the centres of the wool industry and trade. However, by the 14th century Arras still was renowned and drew considerable wealth from the cloth and wool industry, and was particularly well known for its production of fine tapestries—so much so that in English and Italian the word Arras (Arazzi in Italian) was adopted to refer to tapestries in general. The patronage of wealthy cloth merchants ensured that the town became an important cultural centre, with major figures such as the poet Jean Bodel and the trouvère Adam de la Halle making their homes in Arras.

==== Late Middle Ages ====
The ownership of the town was repeatedly disputed along with the rest of Artois. During the Middle Ages, possession of Arras passed to a variety of feudal rulers and fiefs, including the County of Flanders, the Duchy of Burgundy, the Spanish branch of the House of Habsburg and the French crown. In 1430, Joan of Arc (Jeanne d'Arc in French), was imprisoned in the region of Arras. The town was the site of the Congress of Arras in 1435, an unsuccessful attempt to end the Hundred Years' War that resulted in the Burgundians breaking their alliance with the English. After the death of Duke Charles the Bold of Burgundy in 1477, King Louis XI took control of Arras but the town's inhabitants, still loyal to the Burgundians, expelled the French. This prompted Louis XI to besiege Arras in person and, after taking it by assault, he had the town's walls razed and its inhabitants expelled, to be replaced by more loyal subjects from other parts of France. In a bid to erase the town's identity completely, Louis renamed it temporarily to Franchise. In 1482, the Peace of Arras was signed in the town to end a war between Louis XI and Maximilian I of Austria; ten years later, the town was ceded to Maximilian. It was eventually bequeathed to the Spanish Habsburgs as part of the Spanish Netherlands.

==== Renaissance ====
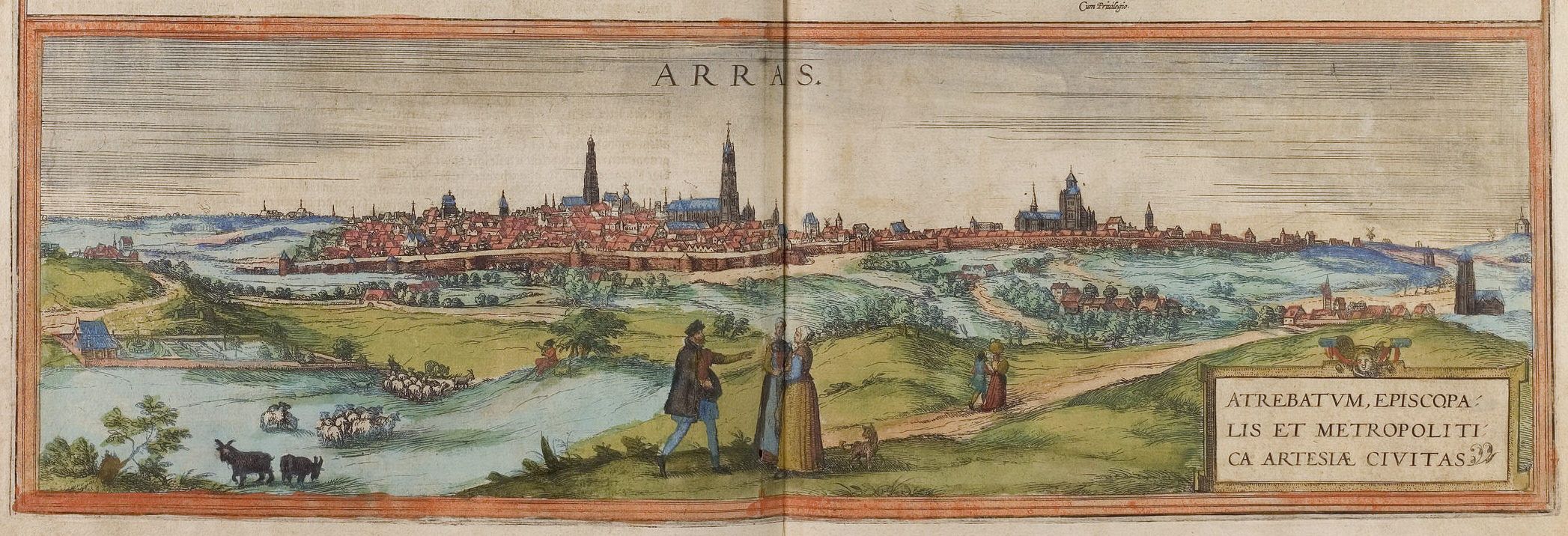
Arras in 1572

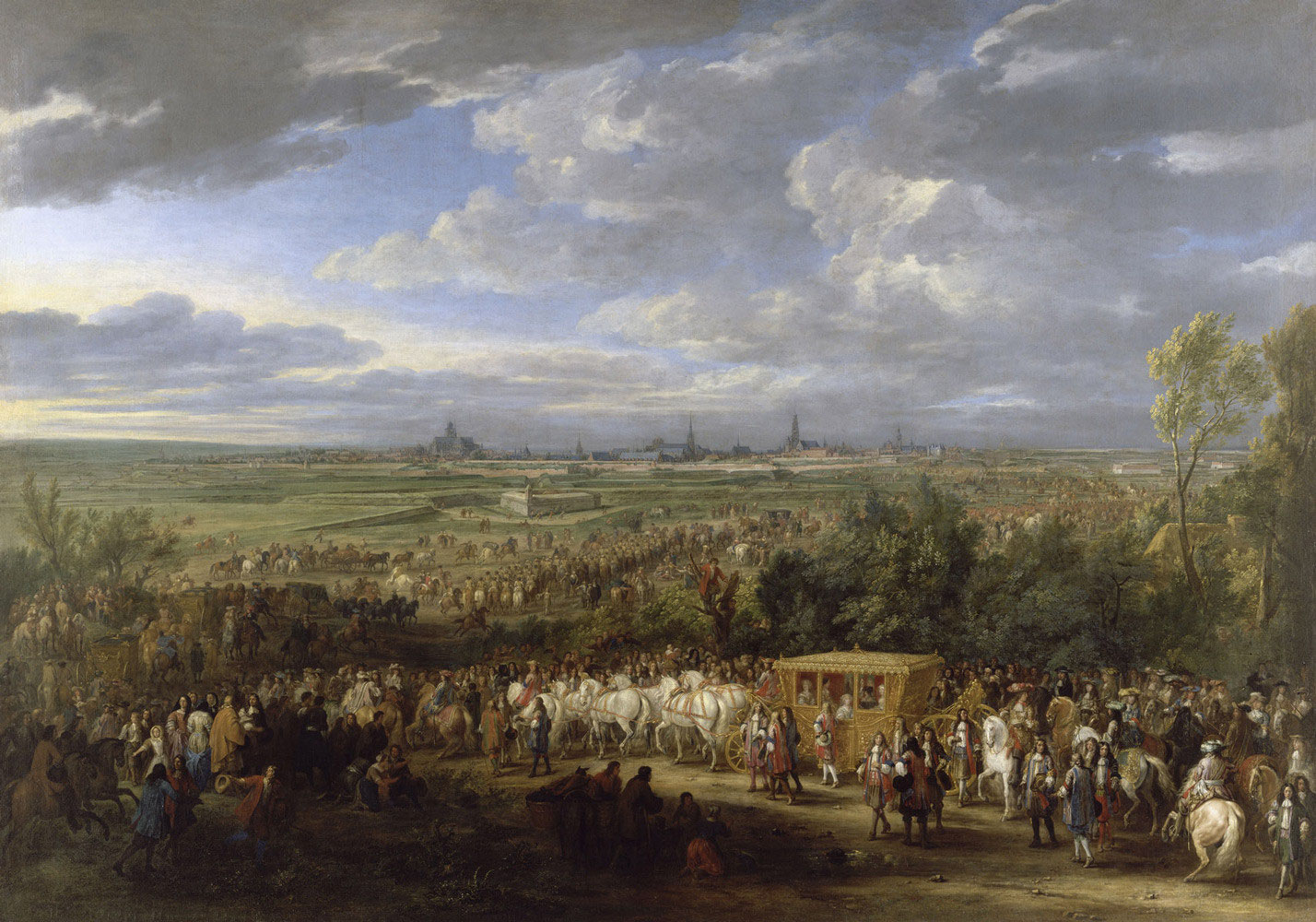
The entry of King Louis XIV and Queen Maria Theresa in Arras on 30 July 1667

Arras remained under Habsburg rule from 1493 until 1640 when it was captured by the French. The Spanish ceded it by the peace treaty in 1659 and it has since remained French. The Union of Arras was signed here in January 1579 by the Catholic principalities of the Low Countries that remained loyal to King Philip II of Habsburg; it provoked the declaration of the Union of Utrecht later the same month.

=== Modern period ===
During the War of the Spanish Succession, in 1712, Arras was bombarded by an Anglo-Dutch Army under Arnold van Keppel, the Earl of Albemarle.

==== French Revolution ====
Maximilien de Robespierre, a French lawyer and politician from Arras and one of the best-known and most influential figures of the French Revolution, was elected fifth deputy of the third estate of Artois to the Estates-General in 1789. Robespierre also helped draft the Declaration of the Rights of Man and of the Citizen.

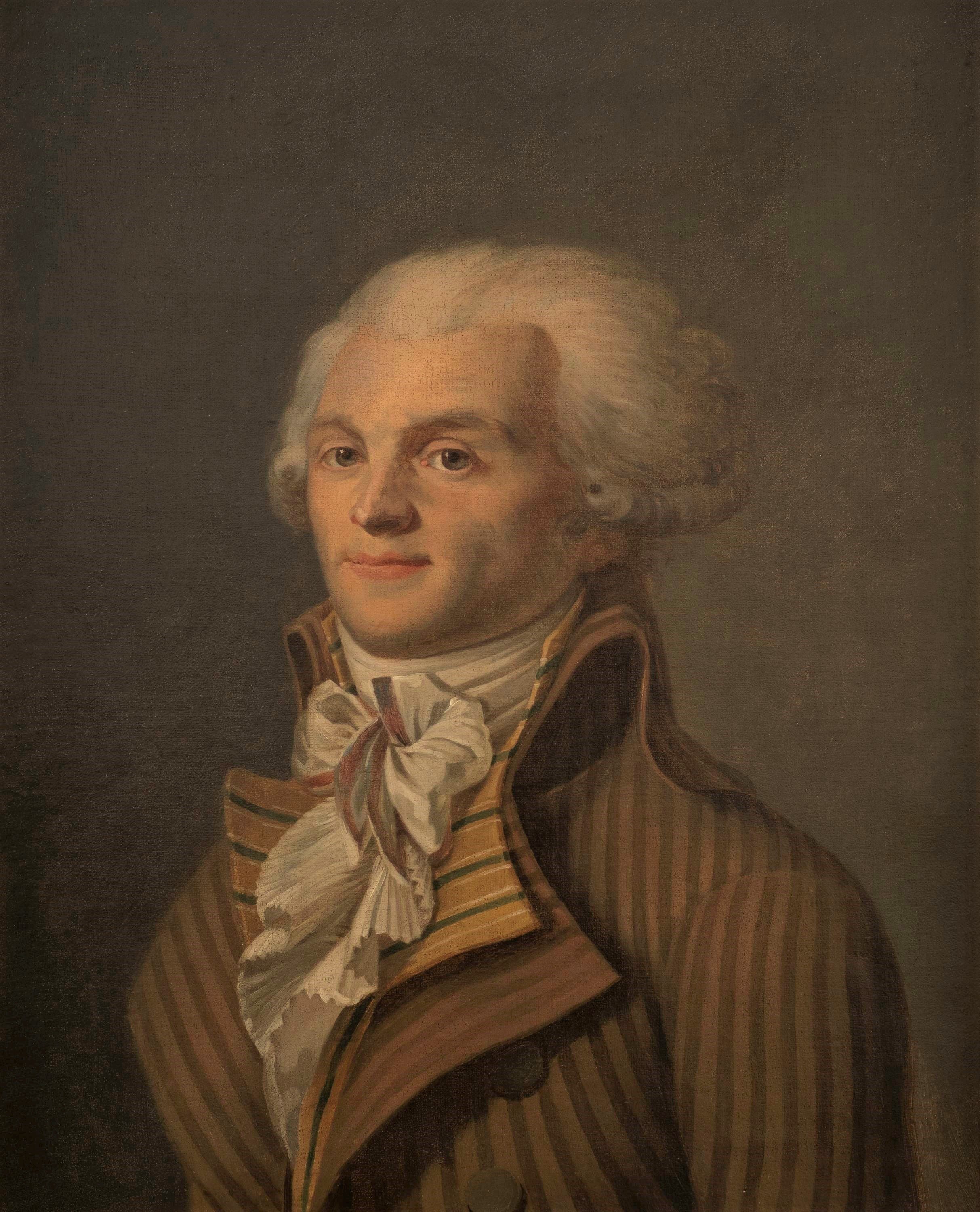
Arras-born lawyer and politician Maximilien de Robespierre

During the French Revolution, the city of Arras was first presided over by French reformer Dubois de Fosseux, erudite squire, secretary of the Arras district (arrondissement in French) and future president of the Pas-de-Calais department. Around the same time, competing against Aire-sur-la-Lys, Calais, and Saint-Omer, Arras won the prefecture of Pas-de-Calais. From September 1793 to July 1794, during the Reign of Terror, the city was under the supervision of Joseph Lebon who implemented food restrictions, ordered 400 executions and destroyed several religious monuments including the Arras Cathedral and the Abbey of St. Vaast. Arras' demography and economic activity remained the same throughout the French Revolution while Lille's grew exponentially. In 1898, under the influence of Mayor Émile Legrelle, some of Arras' ramparts were demolished to build vast boulevards, establish a new sewage system and replace the old railway station from 1846.

==== World Wars ====
===== World War I =====
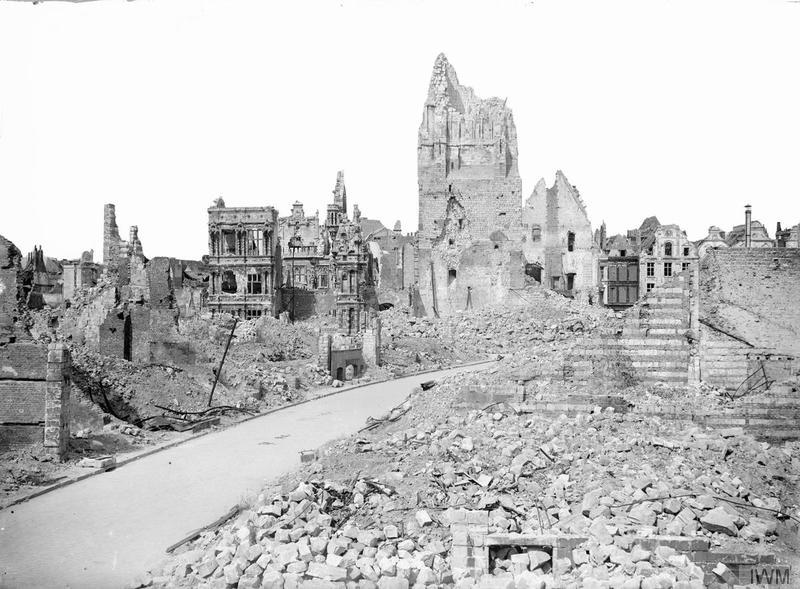
Hôtel de Ville, Arras on 26 May 1917

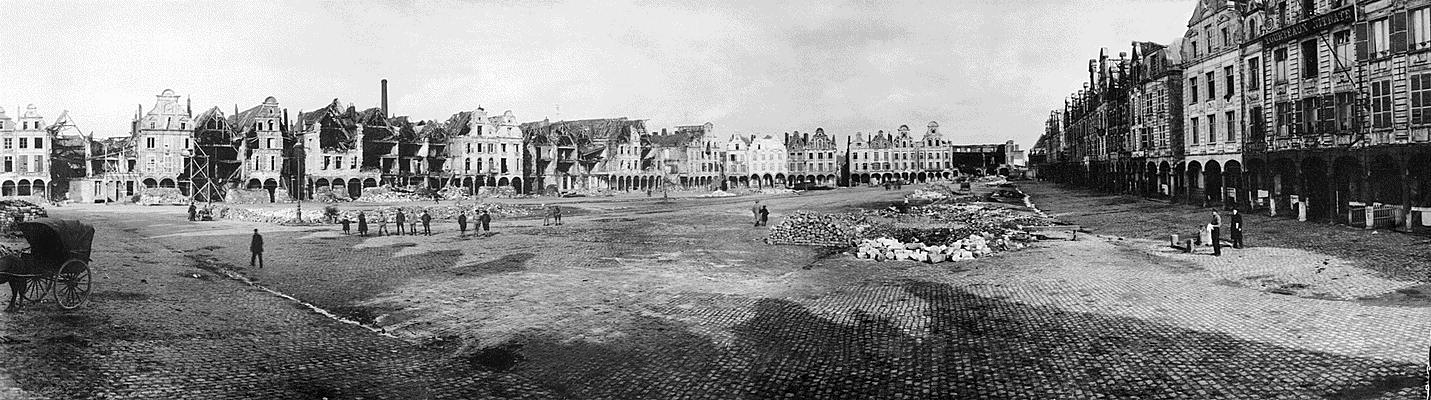
Grand'Place of Arras in February 1919

During most of the First World War, Arras was about 10 kilometres (6.2 miles) away from the front line, and a series of battles took place around the city and nearby, including the Battle of Arras (1914), the Battle of Arras (1917), and the Second Battle of the Somme component of 1918's Hundred Days Offensive.

On 31 August 1914, German light cavalry (Uhlans) arrived in Tilloy-lès-Mofflaines, and an army patrol made a foray into Arras. On 6 September 1914, 3,000 soldiers led by General Hans-Jürgen von Arnim barracked within the city and in the citadel. Shortly after, Louis Ernest de Maud'huy's soldiers partly repelled the German army troops, and trenches were dug in the Faubourgs d'Arras. On 7 October 1914 the city hall burned. On 21 October 1914 the belfry was destroyed, and so was Arras Cathedral on 6 July 1915.

In 1917, a series of medieval tunnels beneath the city, linked and greatly expanded by the New Zealand Tunnelling Company, became a decisive factor in the British forces holding the city - particularly during that year's Battle of Arras.

The nearby Canadian National Vimy Memorial

By the end of World War I (1918), the city was so heavily damaged that three-quarters had to be rebuilt. The reconstruction was extremely costly, yet it proved to be a success and allowed the city to expand. The town is approximately 11 km (6.8 mi) south of the Canadian National Vimy Memorial built in 1936 on Hill 145, the highest point of the Vimy Ridge escarpment. It is dedicated to the Battle of Vimy Ridge assault (part of the 1917 Battle of Arras) and the missing First World War Canadian soldiers with no known grave; it is also the site of two WWI Canadian cemeteries.

On 9 April 2017, the 100th anniversary of the Battle of Vimy Ridge, Arras Mayor Frédéric Leturque thanked Canadians, as well as Australians and British, New Zealanders and South Africans, for their role in the First World War battles in the area.

===== World War II =====
In the early stages of the second World War, during the invasion of France in May 1940, the city was the focus of a major British counterattack. Arras saw an Allied counterattack against the flank of the German army. The German forces were pushing north towards the channel coast, in order to entrap the Allied Forces that were advancing east into Belgium. The counterattack at Arras was an Allied attempt to cut through the German spearhead and frustrate the German advance. Although the Allies initially made gains, they were repulsed by German forces and forced to withdraw to avoid encirclement. Arras was then occupied by the Germans and over the years 1941-44 218 French Resistance members were executed in ditches around the Arras citadel.

On 3 September 1944, the city was entered and liberated by the British Guards Armoured Division.

=== Contemporary period ===
==== Town twinning ====
===== Ipswich =====
In September 1993, Ipswich and Arras became twin towns.

Ipswich marked this relationship by dedicating a public square, known as Arras Square. It is surrounded by Ancient House, the Buttermarket Centre and St. Stephen's Church.

Reciprocally, Arras has dedicated a public square to Ipswich, known as Ipswich Square (Place d'Ipswich). This square is identifiable by the presence of a British red telephone box.

== Geography ==
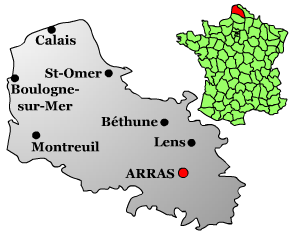
Arras in the Pas-de-Calais

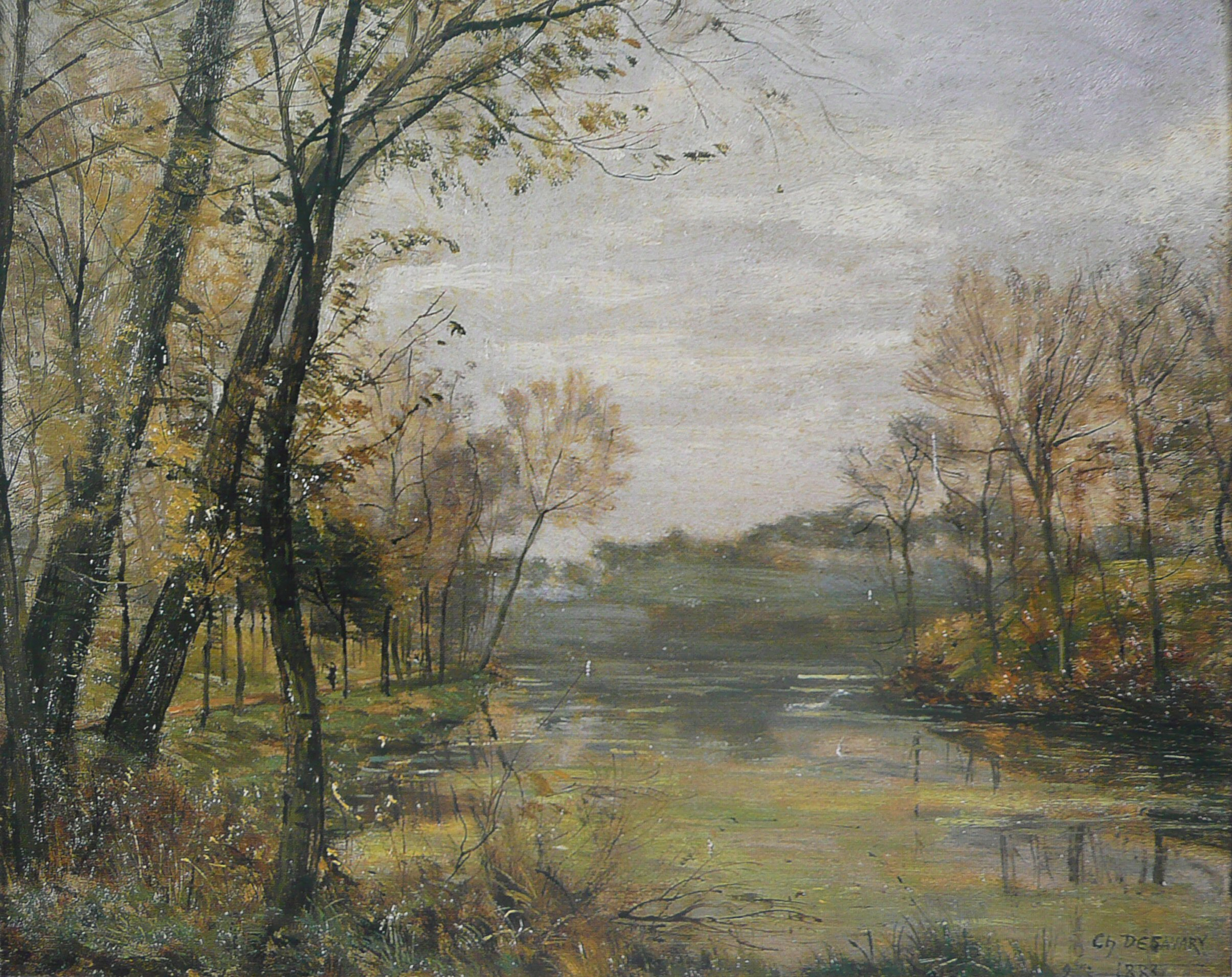
"La Scarpe" by Arras-born painter Charles Desavary

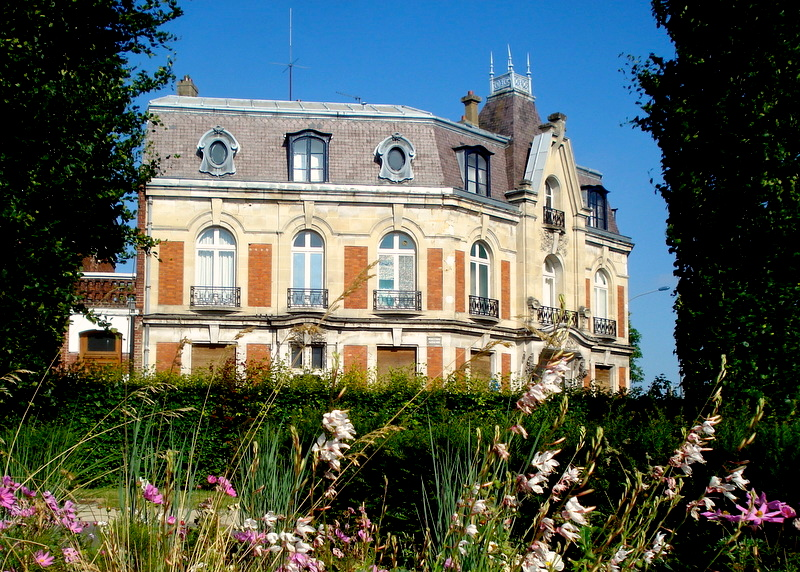
Arras in the summer

=== Location and area ===
Arras is located in northern France in the Hauts-de-France region. Hauts-de-France is divided into five departments: Nord, Pas-de-Calais, Somme, Oise, and Aisne. Arras is in the south-east part of the Pas-de-Calais department and forms the Arras district (arrondissement d'Arras) in the Artois, a former province of northern France.

By car, it is 182 kilometres (113 miles) north of Paris, 110 kilometres (68 miles) east of the English Channel, 152 kilometres (94 miles) south of Brussels, and 335 kilometres (208 miles) south of Amsterdam.

The city's total area is 11.63 km^{2} (4.5 sq mi). The lowest point in the city is at 52 metres (171 feet) above sea level and the highest is at 99 metres (325 feet).

=== Geology ===
The soil of Arras is primarily composed of chalk, a soft, white, porous sedimentary rock that formed what is called the European stratigraphic unit. That Chalk Group deposited during the Late Cretaceous period 90 million years ago. It used to be extracted to construct the most prestigious buildings and houses of Arras. As a result, residents once nicknamed the city La ville blanche (the White Town). The Arras area soil is also composed of clay, which was used to produce bricks, build less noble buildings, and embellish façades. Clay is mostly found in the lieu-dit of La Terre Potier in the western part of the city.

The level of earthquake hazard in the Arras area is low, as it is in the whole Pas-de-Calais department.

=== Hydrography ===
Two rivers flow through Arras: the Scarpe and the Crinchon; both are left tributaries of the 350 kilometres (220 miles) long Scheldt river (L'Escaut in French). The Crinchon is a rather small river of 19 kilometres (12 miles) flowing through Arras underground, while the Scarpe is 102 kilometres (63 miles) long, of which two-thirds has been turned into canals.

The source of the Scarpe is at Berles-Monchel near Aubigny-en-Artois. It flows through the cities of Arras, Douai and Saint-Amand-les-Eaux. The river ends at Mortagne-du-Nord where it flows into the Scheldt.

=== Climate ===
Arras mainly has a Western European oceanic climate (Köppen climate classification: Cfb) affected by the North Atlantic Current as it is close to the English Channel (La Manche in French). There is frequent rain in all seasons, and temperatures throughout the year are mild, as it is near the sea. Temperature variations tend to be moderate; but there are some brief cold spells as it is subject to both oceanic and continental influences. So the climate can also be referred as semi-oceanic (known as a Climat océanique dégradé in French).

Summer days are usually moderately warm and agreeable, with temperatures between 13 and 23 °C (55 and 73 °F), occasionally rising above 30 °C (86 °F), with a fair amount of sunshine. Some years have even witnessed some unusual long periods of harsh summer weather, such as the heat wave of 2003 where temperatures exceeded 30 °C (86 °F) for weeks, reaching 38 °C (100 °F) on some days and rarely even cooling down at night. Spring and Fall have rather warm days and fresh nights, but remain quite unstable. Winter days are cold but generally above freezing, at around 2 °C (36 °F); sunshine is usually scarce. Light night frosts are common as the temperature often falls below 0 °C (32 °F). Snowfall has been rare in the past decade but happens in some winters, such as 2009–10, with unusually cold weather: much of Europe had heavy snowfall and record-low temperatures. The most recent warmest winters recorded were in 1989–90, 1994–95, 2006–07 and 2013–14. The Arras region (and most of Northern Europe) had remarkably warm and sunny weather in the winter of 2013–14.

Rain falls throughout the year. Average annual precipitation is 711.4 millimetres (28.01 in) with light rainfall evenly distributed throughout the year. The highest recorded temperature was 41.7 °C (107.1 °F) on 25 July 2019, and the lowest was −14.7 °C (5.5 °F) on 19 January 2024.

On 28 October 2013, Cyclone Christian (also known as the St. Jude storm), one of the strongest extra-tropical cyclones ever recorded, hit Northern Europe including the Arras area. The cyclone's central pressure was 981 mb, and wind speeds reached a maximum of 121 km/h (75 mph). The city of Arras did not experience any major damage.

Climate data for Arras (1991–2020 normals, extremes 1987-present)
Month	Jan	Feb	Mar	Apr	May	Jun	Jul	Aug	Sep	Oct	Nov	Dec	Year
Record high °C (°F)	14.9 (58.8)	18.2 (64.8)	24.3 (75.7)	26.8 (80.2)	31.1 (88.0)	36.8 (98.2)	41.7 (107.1)	38.4 (101.1)	34.6 (94.3)	29.3 (84.7)	19.9 (67.8)	16.1 (61.0)	41.7 (107.1)
Mean daily maximum °C (°F)	6.2 (43.2)	7.2 (45.0)	11.0 (51.8)	14.9 (58.8)	18.1 (64.6)	21.2 (70.2)	23.6 (74.5)	23.7 (74.7)	20.1 (68.2)	15.2 (59.4)	9.9 (49.8)	6.7 (44.1)	14.8 (58.6)
Daily mean °C (°F)	3.8 (38.8)	4.3 (39.7)	7.2 (45.0)	10.0 (50.0)	13.3 (55.9)	16.2 (61.2)	18.4 (65.1)	18.4 (65.1)	15.4 (59.7)	11.5 (52.7)	7.2 (45.0)	4.3 (39.7)	10.8 (51.4)
Mean daily minimum °C (°F)	1.3 (34.3)	1.4 (34.5)	3.4 (38.1)	5.1 (41.2)	8.4 (47.1)	11.2 (52.2)	13.1 (55.6)	13.1 (55.6)	10.7 (51.3)	7.9 (46.2)	4.4 (39.9)	1.9 (35.4)	6.8 (44.2)
Record low °C (°F)	−14.7 (5.5)	−13.3 (8.1)	−9.4 (15.1)	−4.4 (24.1)	−1.3 (29.7)	2.3 (36.1)	5.1 (41.2)	4.4 (39.9)	0.5 (32.9)	−4.0 (24.8)	−8.6 (16.5)	−12.8 (9.0)	−14.7 (5.5)
Average precipitation mm (inches)	56.7 (2.23)	48.7 (1.92)	50.2 (1.98)	42.7 (1.68)	61.0 (2.40)	60.9 (2.40)	64.9 (2.56)	62.9 (2.48)	57.6 (2.27)	65.4 (2.57)	64.0 (2.52)	76.4 (3.01)	711.4 (28.01)
Average precipitation days (≥ 1.0 mm)	11.4	10.2	10.0	9.4	10.1	8.9	9.3	9.4	9.5	11.1	12.8	13.0	125.1
Source: Meteociel

== Population and society ==
Historical population

Year	Pop.	±% p.a.
1793	21,019	—
1800	19,958	−0.74%
1806	19,286	−0.57%
1821	19,798	+0.17%
1831	23,419	+1.69%
1836	23,485	+0.06%
1841	24,439	+0.80%
1846	26,956	+1.98%
1851	25,271	−1.28%
1856	26,216	+0.74%
1861	25,905	−0.24%
1866	25,749	−0.12%
1872	27,329	+1.00%
1876	26,764	−0.52%
1881	27,041	+0.21%
1886	26,914	−0.09%
1891	25,701	−0.92%
1896	26,144	+0.34%
1901	25,813	−0.25%

Year	Pop.	±% p.a.
1906	24,921	−0.70%
1911	26,080	+0.91%
1921	24,835	−0.49%
1926	29,718	+3.66%
1931	29,490	−0.15%
1936	31,488	+1.32%
1946	33,345	+0.57%
1954	36,242	+1.05%
1962	41,761	+1.79%
1968	49,144	+2.75%
1975	46,483	−0.79%
1982	41,736	−1.53%
1990	38,983	−0.85%
1999	40,590	+0.45%
2007	42,672	+0.63%
2012	41,239	−0.68%
2017	41,019	−0.11%
2023	42,875	+0.74%

Source: EHESS and INSEE (1968-2023)

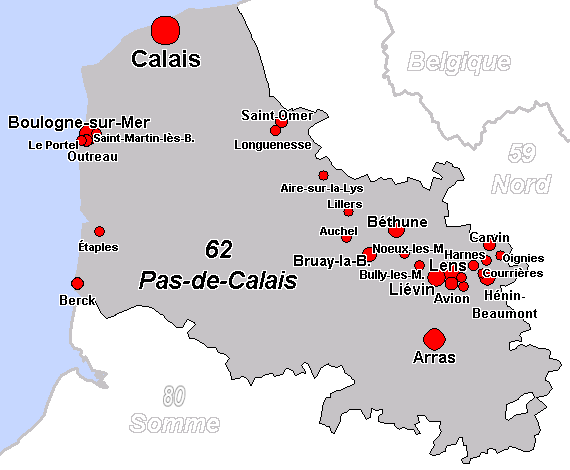
Communes with more than 10,000 inhabitants in the Pas-de-Calais department

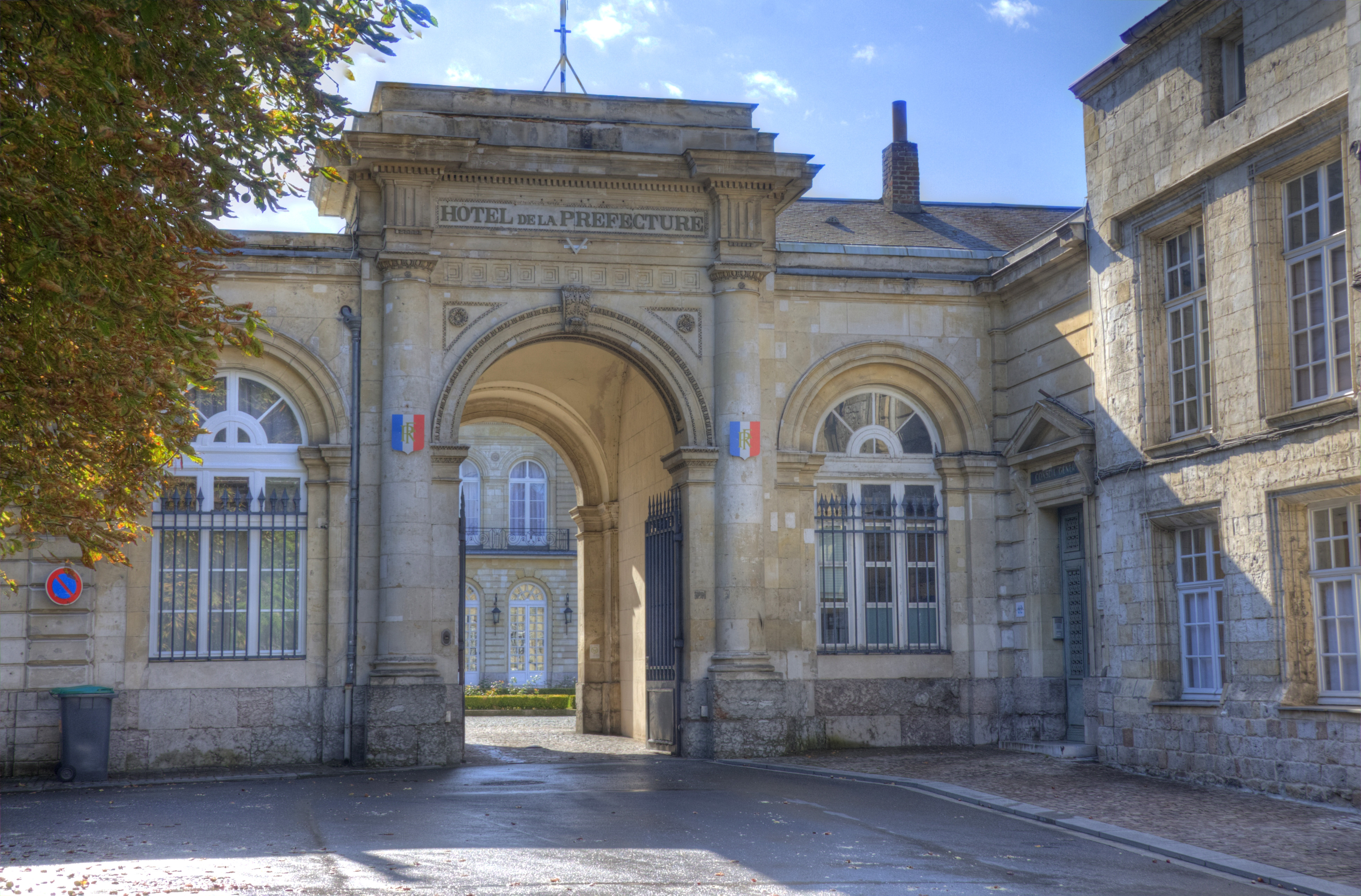
The Arras Prefecture

=== Demographics ===
As of 2023, the population of Arras is 42,875 for a density of 3,687 people per square kilometre. The residents go by the name of Arrageois (male) and Arrageoise (female) in French. The population is rather young as the highest number of residents is 15-29 of age. The most recent male to female ratio is 100:109, and the female to male ratio is 100:92 (2019). There are 19,947 males (48%) for 21,747 females (52%). The Arras functional area has a population of 159,719 (2022).

=== Religion ===
Arras's Basilique-Cathédrale Notre-Dame et Saint-Vaast is the cathedral, a minor basilica, episcopal see of the Roman Catholic Diocese of Arras.

=== Education ===
Arras is part of the académie de Lille (Lille's School District). There are 11 écoles maternelles (nursery schools), 11 écoles primaires (elementary schools), 8 collèges (junior high schools), and 7 lycées (high schools) within the city.

== Sights and attractions ==
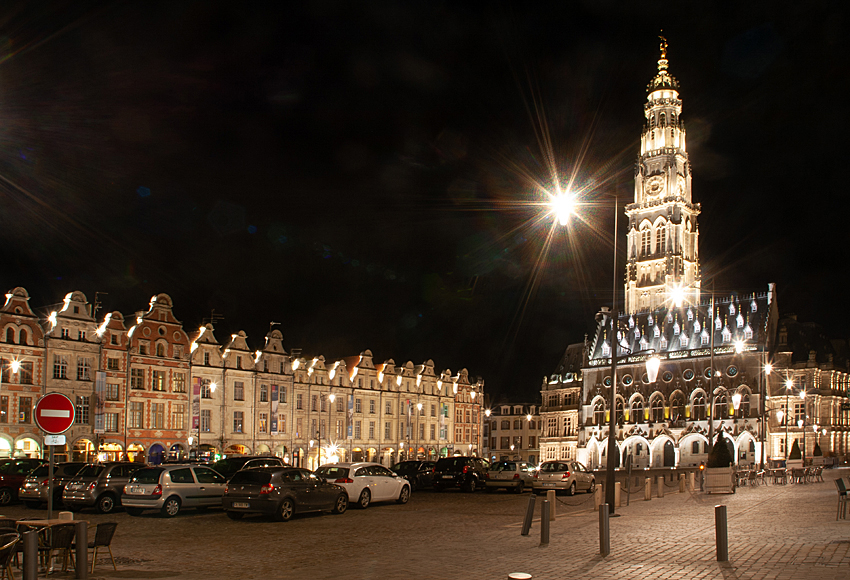
La Place des Héros, Arras at night

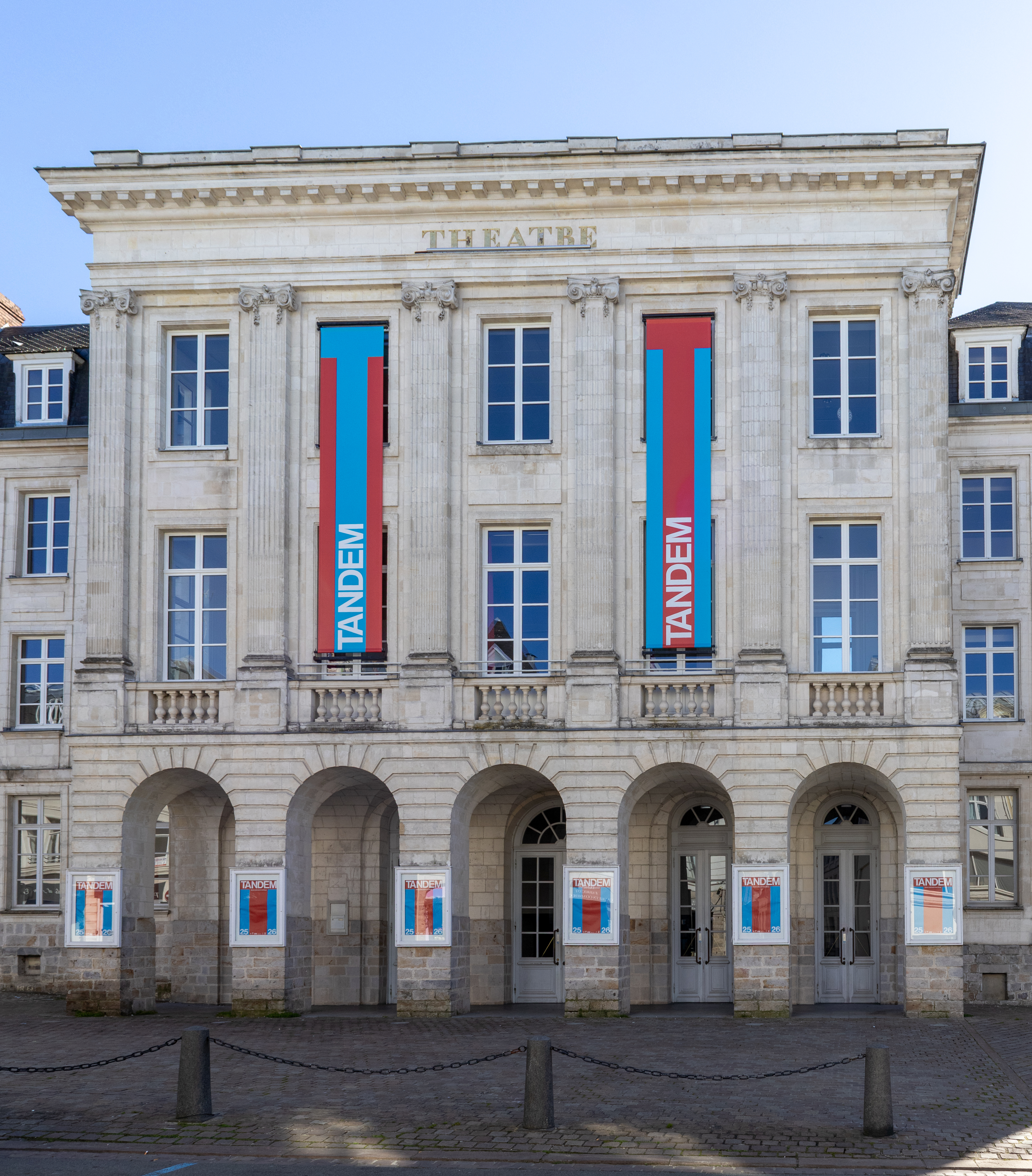
The Theatre

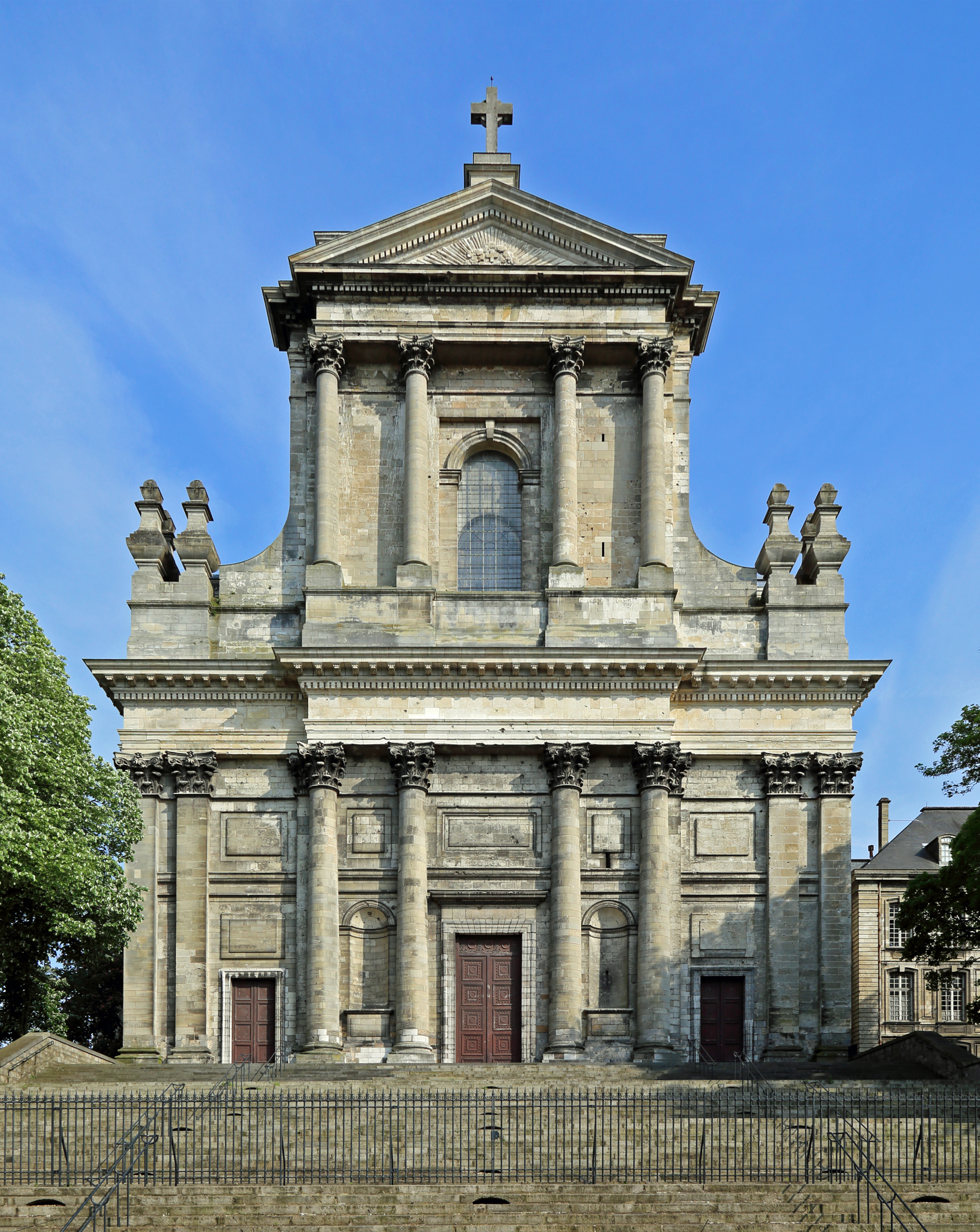
Arras Cathedral

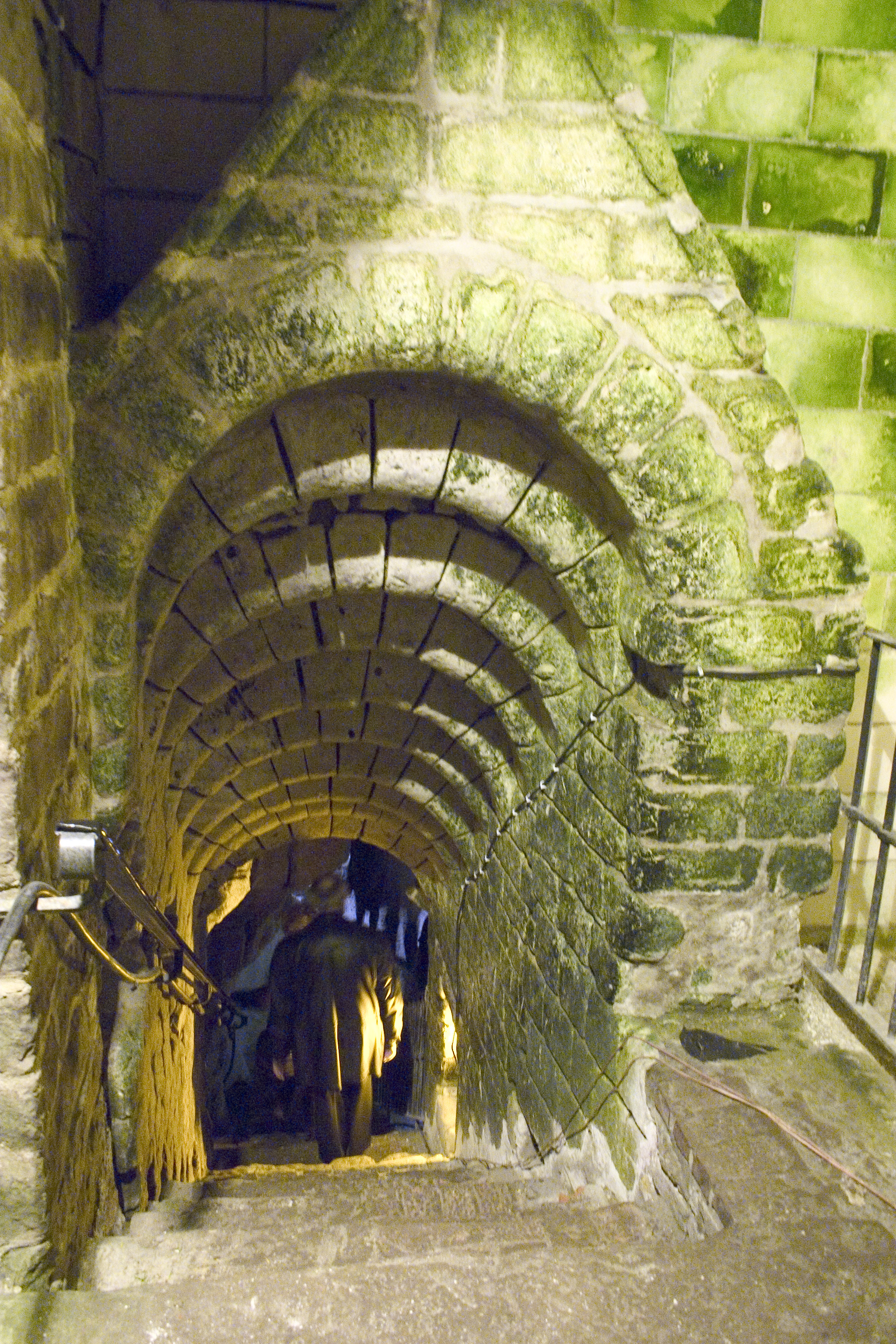
The Boves

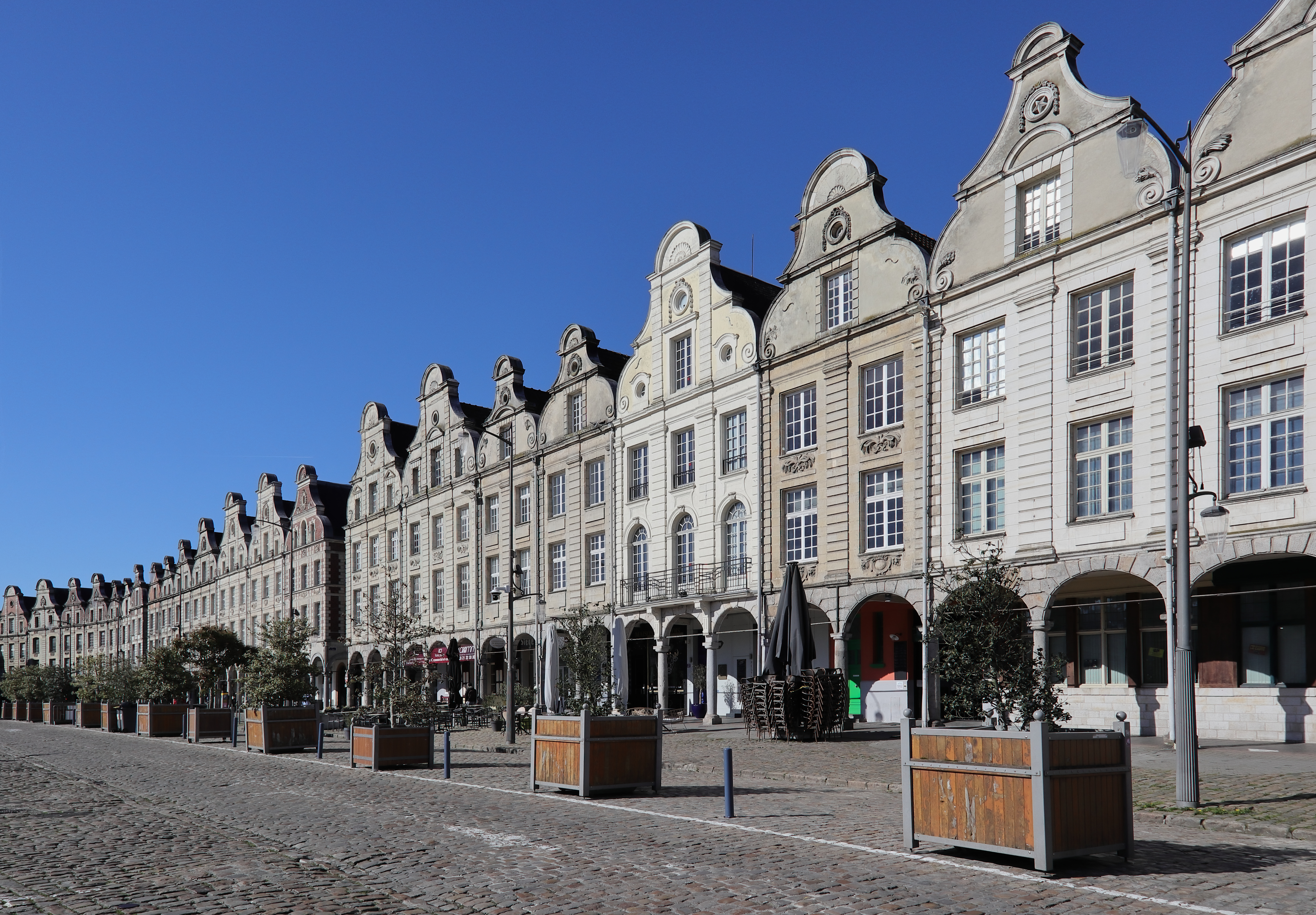
Facades of the Grand Place

=== Squares ===
The city centre is marked by two large squares, La Grand' Place and La Place des Héros, also called La Petite Place. The two squares are surrounded by a unique architectural ensemble of 155 Flemish-Baroque-style townhouses. These were built in the 17th and 18th century and were initially made of wood. In 1918, after the end of World War I, most of the townhouses were so severely damaged that they had to be restored to their pre-war conditions. They are now made of bricks.

=== Town hall and belfry ===
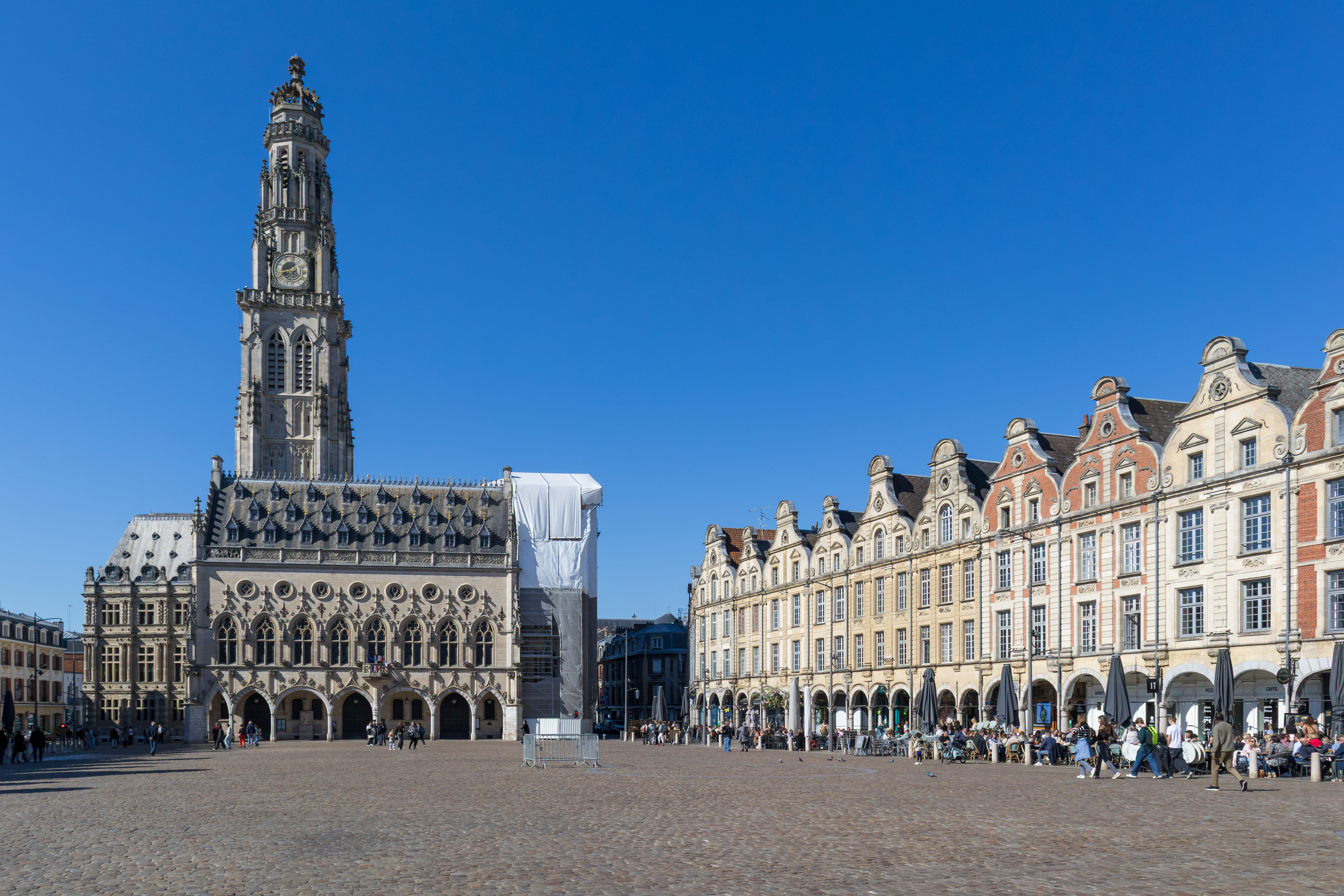
The Hôtel de Ville

The Hôtel de Ville in Arras and its belfry were constructed in the early 16th century and had to be rebuilt in a slightly less grandiose style after World War I. The belfry is 75 metres (246 feet) high and used to serve as a watchtower. Nowadays tourists can enjoy ascending the belfry. In 2005, the belfry was added to the UNESCO World Heritage List as part of the Belfries of Belgium and France site because of its architecture and historical importance in maintaining municipal power in Europe.

=== Cathedral of Arras ===
The original cathedral was constructed between 1030 and 1396. This Gothic structure was destroyed during the French Revolution and rebuilt in the 19th century. The present Basilique-Cathédrale Notre-Dame et Saint-Vaast is a minor basilica.

=== The Boves ===
The Boves, a well-preserved underground network of tunnels, 10 metres (33 feet) beneath the city, was built in the 10th century and can now be visited by tourists. The idea was to set up a vast underground network to make all inhabitants' cellars interconnect by means of tunnels. Excavation material (chalk) was not wasted but rather used to construct houses. During World War I and World War II, the Boves was utilized as an underground bunker to hide and protect residents and valued objects from falling bombs.

=== Art District ===
The Art District is renowned for its Italian-style theatre hall built in 1785 and the Hôtel de Guînes, a private 18th-century townhouse that attracts artists, designers and producers of intimist shows.

=== Abbey District ===
Many of Arras's most remarkable structures, including the Musée des beaux-arts d'Arras and several government buildings, occupy the site of the old Abbey of St. Vaast. The abbey's church was demolished and rebuilt in fashionable classical style in 1833, and now serves as the town's cathedral. The design was chosen by the one-time Abbot of St Vaast, the Cardinal de Rohan, and is stark in its simplicity, employing a vast number of perpendicular angles. There is a fine collection of statuary within the church and it houses a number of religious relics.

=== Vauban Citadel ===
Built by Vauban between 1667 and 1672, the Citadel has been nicknamed La belle inutile (the beautiful useless one) by residents as it has never been directly involved in heavy fighting and didn't prevent the Germans from occupying the city in either World War. Since 7 July 2008 it has been part of the UNESCO World Heritage Sites Fortifications of Vauban which includes eleven other fortifications. Within the citadel on the side of La Place de Manœuvre a small Baroque-style chapel was built. Outside, Le Mur des Fusillés (the wall of the people executed by a firing squad) pays tribute to the 218 members of the French Resistance shot in the citadel's ditch during World War II.

=== Seasonal events ===
Arras holds the biggest Christmas market north of Paris every year from the end of November to the end of December. Around 80 exhibitors offer a wide selection of arts and crafts, as well as local delicacies like chocolate rats, Atrébate beer and Cœurs d'Arras – heart-shaped biscuits which come in two flavours, ginger, and cheese. Entertainment includes cooking lessons with chefs, craft demonstrations, a merry-go-round, a Ferris wheel, an ice-skating rink, and heated shelters. It also offers native products from International locations such as Canada, Vietnam, Morocco, Indonesia, Africa, and gourmet regional specialities from different parts of France: Auvergne, Savoie, South-Western France, and Nord-Pas-de-Calais.

The Main Square Festival is held for several days in early July within the Vauban Citadel, attracting tens of thousands of attendees and playing host to major acts such as The Chemical Brothers, Coldplay, Imagine Dragons, David Guetta, and The Black Eyed Peas.

The Arras Film Festival is a film festival held for ten days in November.

Le Jardin botanique Floralpina is a private botanical garden, specializing in alpine plants. It opens every year on the last Sunday of May and can be visited by appointment.

=== UNESCO recognition ===
Two buildings in Arras are listed as UNESCO World Heritage Sites:

- The Belfry of the Town Hall, as part of the Belfries of Belgium and France group, since 2005
- The Vauban citadel, as part of the Fortifications of Vauban group, since 2008

=== Outside Arras ===
The Vimy Memorial is a memorial just north of the town honouring a major World War I battle, the Battle of Vimy Ridge, which marked the first time Canada fielded an entire army of her own. Four Canadian divisions fought there on Easter weekend 1917. The Battle of Vimy Ridge was part of the broader Allied offensive in April known as the Battle of Arras. The Canadian National Vimy Memorial is nearby. Vimy was the only victory the Allies would enjoy during their 1917 spring offensive. The Basilica of Notre Dame de Lorette cemetery, overlooking the nearby village of Ablain-Saint-Nazaire, likewise stands before one of France's largest World War I necropolises. Part of an extensive network of tunnels dug in World War I by British Empire soldiers can be visited at the Carrière Wellington museum in the suburbs.

== Transportation ==
=== Railway station ===
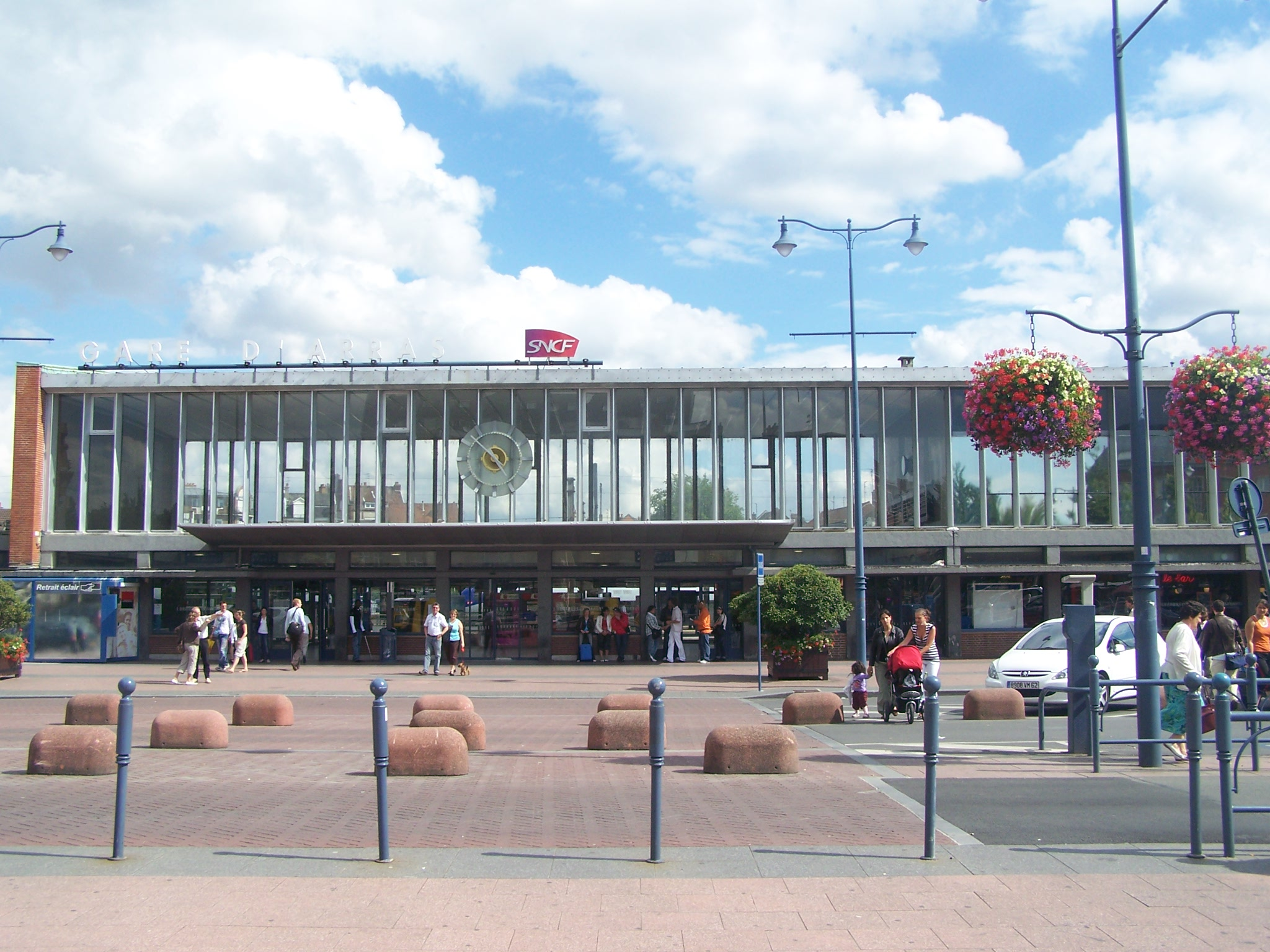
La Gare d'Arras

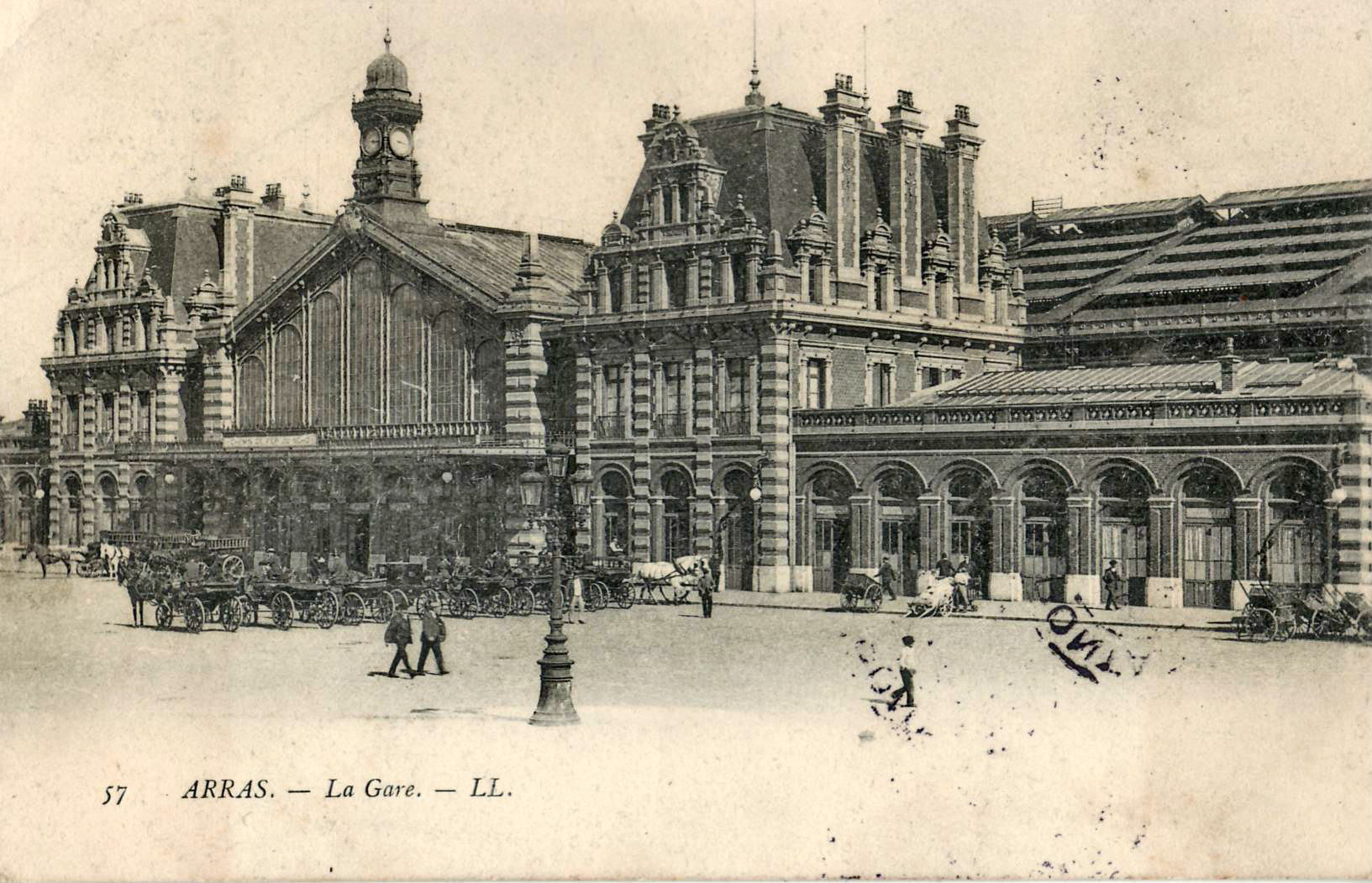
La Gare d'Arras before 1907

The Gare d'Arras railway station is served by a purpose-built branch of the LGV Nord high speed railway, with regular TGV services to Paris (50 minutes). There are also regular trains to Lille, Amiens, Dunkerque, and several regional destinations.

==== TGV lines ====
- Ligne Saint-Omer / Dunkerque–Lens–Arras–Paris-Nord
- Ligne Valenciennes–Douai–Arras–Paris-Nord
- Ligne Lille–Europe–Lyon–Marseille
- Ligne Lille–Europe–Rennes
- Ligne Lille–Europe–Nantes–Saint-Nazaire
- Ligne Lille–Europe–Bordeaux

==== TER Nord-Pas-de-Calais lines ====
- Ligne 2: Lille–Douai–Arras–Amiens–Rouen
- Ligne 6: Arras–Hazebrouck–Dunkerque
- Ligne 7: Arras–Hazebrouck–Calais
- Ligne 14: Arras–Saint-Pol-sur-Ternoise–Etaples–Boulogne-sur-Mer
- Ligne Lille–Arras (TERGV)

=== Highway ===
Autoroute A1 (A1 highway) is a tollway that connects Arras with Lille and Paris. As part of the European 'inter-country' route E15, it also connects Arras with the United Kingdom and Spain as well as the northern and southern parts of France. Autoroute A26 (A26 highway) connects Arras with Calais and Reims.

Autoroute A1 connecting Arras with Paris and Lille.

Autoroute A26 connecting Arras with Calais and Reims.

The European route E15 connecting Arras with the United Kingdom and Spain as well as the northern and southern parts of France.

== Notable people ==
Arras was one of the centres of trouvère poetry, and trouvères from Arras include:

- Adam de la Halle (c. 1240–1287)
- Andrieu Contredit d'Arras (c. 1200–1248)
- Audefroi le Bastart (fl. c. 1200–1230)
- Dame Margot
- Dame Maroie
- Eberhard of Béthune ( ? - 1212), grammarian
- Gaidifer d'Avion
- Guillaume le Vinier (c. 1190–1245)
- Jaques le Vinier
- Jehan Bretel (c. 1200–1272)
- Jehan le Cuvelier d'Arras (fl. c. 1240–70)
- Jehan Erart († c. 1259)
- Mahieu de Gant
- Moniot d'Arras (fl. 1213–1239)
- Robert de Castel
- Robert de la Piere

Arras was the birthplace of:

- Matthias of Arras (c. 1290–1352), architect
- Antoine de Févin (c. 1470–1511/12), composer
- Charles de l'Écluse (1526–1609), doctor and pioneering botanist
- Philippe Rogier (c. 1561–1596), composer
- Eustachius De Lannoy (1715–1777), general of Travancore army
- Maximilien de Robespierre (1758–1794), revolutionary leader
- Charlotte de Robespierre (1760–1834), memoirist
- Augustin de Robespierre (1763–1794), revolutionary
- Joseph Le Bon (1765–1795), politician
- Eugène François Vidocq (1775–1857), one of the first modern private investigators
- Alexandre Georges (1850–1938), composer and organist
- Lucien Gaudin (1886–1934), fencing champion
- Gabriel Hanot (1889–1968), journalist
- Violette Leduc (1907–1972), author
- Jean-Christophe Novelli (born 1961), chef and restaurateur
- Philippe Hermann (born 1962), writer
- Xavier Dablemont (born 1975), footballer
- Benoît Assou-Ekotto (born 1984), footballer
- Léon Lejeal (born 1862), Americanist and academic

== Twin towns – sister cities ==
Arras is twinned with:

- Deva, Romania
- Herten, Germany
- Ipswich, England, United Kingdom
- Oudenaarde, Belgium

== See also ==
- Battles of Arras, for a list of battles named after the city.
- Lion and Sun#Other (non-Iranian) variants
- Marcel Gaumont Sculpture in cathedral
- Achicourt station
