= Henri Froidevaux =

French historian and geographer (1863–1954)

Henri Léon Marie Froidevaux (1863 Paris – 1954 Versailles) was a French historian and geographer who was the director of the Library of the Société de Géographie beginning in 1901. He was the author of many works on French colonies, particularly those in French Guiana, Madagascar, and Pondicherry.

== Early life ==
Henri Léon Marie Froidevaux was born on November 1, 1863, but was orphaned. He was raised in Paris by his grandfather, Léon-Louis Buron. Henri graduated in 1884 with a degree in literature, then in law in 1886. He later added history and geography in 1888. Henri became a doctor of letters in 1892 with a thesis about the French Congo.

== Career ==
Froidevaux taught at the lycée in Vendôme from 1890 to 1895. He held the chair in modern and contemporary history at the Catholic University of Paris, and after 34 he took on a leadership position. He was a professor at the Collège de France.

Froidevaux became a specialist in overseas affairs; he was the Secretary of the Bureau de renseignements scientifiques (Scientific Information Bureau), and from 1898 to 1904, he was the Secretary of the Colonial Office. In 1900, he became a library archivist, and in 1901directory of the library of the Société de géographie.

He was the governor of French India. He was a member of the Ligue de la patrie française. He was named a knight of the Legion of Honour in 1913. He was the Secretary General of the Société des américanistes. He was the editor of Questions diplomatiques et coloniales from its founding until 1899. He replaced Robert de Caix in 1919 as the Chief Editor of Asie française until it ceased publication in 1940.

== Publications ==
- Les Études d'Histoire Coloniale en France et dans les Pays de Colonisation Française. Honoré Champion, Émile Larose, Paris. Libraires de la Société de l'Histoire des Colonies Françaises. 1913
- Note sur le voyageur guyanais Pierre Barrère. Paris: impr. Nationale. 1896.

== Awards and Prizes ==
=== Awards ===
- Chevalier de la Légion d'honneur, 11 January 1913

=== Prix ===
- Prix Montyon, 1919, La grande route de l’ancien monde
- Prix Audiffred from l'Académie des Sciences Morales et Politiques, L'Œuvre scolaire de la France aux Colonies
- Prix Jonnard from the Société de Géographie, for his work on the history and geography of French Guiana and Madagascar.
- Gold Medal as a member of the committee responsible for ensuring that the Ministère des Colonies participated in the Exposition Universelle de 1900.
