= Karl Wilhelm Hiersemann =

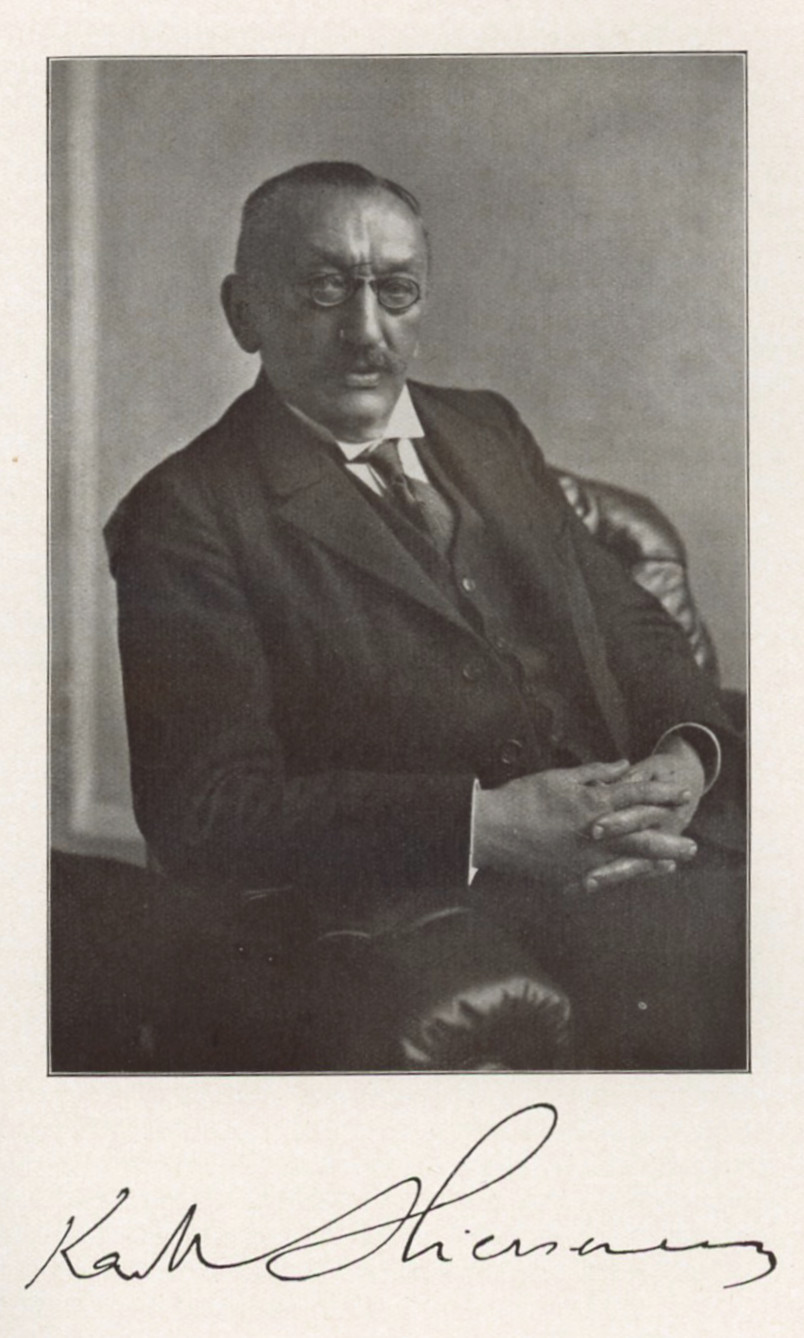
Karl Wilhelm Hiersemann in 1925

Karl Wilhelm Hiersemann (born September 3, 1854, in Bortewitz (Saxony); died September 9, 1928, in Leipzig) was a German antiquarian and publisher.

== Life and Work ==
Hiersemann came from a farming family in Saxony and decided to become a bookseller at the age of 13. He completed his apprenticeship in Leipzig at the Booksellers' Training Institute, as well as at List & Francke (from October 1869 to spring 1874), and in Mannheim with J. Bensheimer. In 1876, he went to London to work for the antiquarian booksellers David Nutt and Trübner & Co., and from 1881 onward, he worked at K. F. Koehler's Antiquarium in Leipzig.

On his 30th birthday in 1884, he founded a new company in Leipzig under his own name, K. W. Hiersemann. The store specialized in Orientalia, modern linguistics, art, architecture, decorative arts, numismatics, and genealogy. The economics of the time provided favorable conditions for the company and it developed very rapidly from modest beginnings, becoming within a few decades an internationally leading antiquarian bookstore with a worldwide reputation.

The company moved into its own building at Goldschmidtstraße 29 in Leipzig's Graphic Arts Quarter in 1909. By 1924, 540 catalogs had been published and more than 100 libraries acquired, including significant collections such as the Weigel Collection of 84 manuscripts from the 9th to the 16th centuries, purchased in 1905. The last antiquarian catalog, No. 669, was published during the Second World War. In the five floors of his prestigious building, Hiersemann maintained a substantial stock of valuable books and exhibition spaces, as well as an extensive reference library and the highly regarded tool: the Hiersemann Card Catalog of Antiquarian Titles with bibliographical descriptions and prices. After Hiersemann's death in 1928, his son Anton Hiersemann took over the business.

From 1892 onwards, the antiquarian bookshop developed into a scientific publishing house, the Anton Hiersemann Verlag; an export bookshop was also attached to the antiquarian bookshop, which supplied libraries all over the world, especially in America and Russia.

A commemorative publication was issued by Martin Breslauer and K. Koehler for Hiersemann's 70th birthday and 40th business anniversary. He was awarded an honorary doctorate by the Technical University of Hanover in 1924.

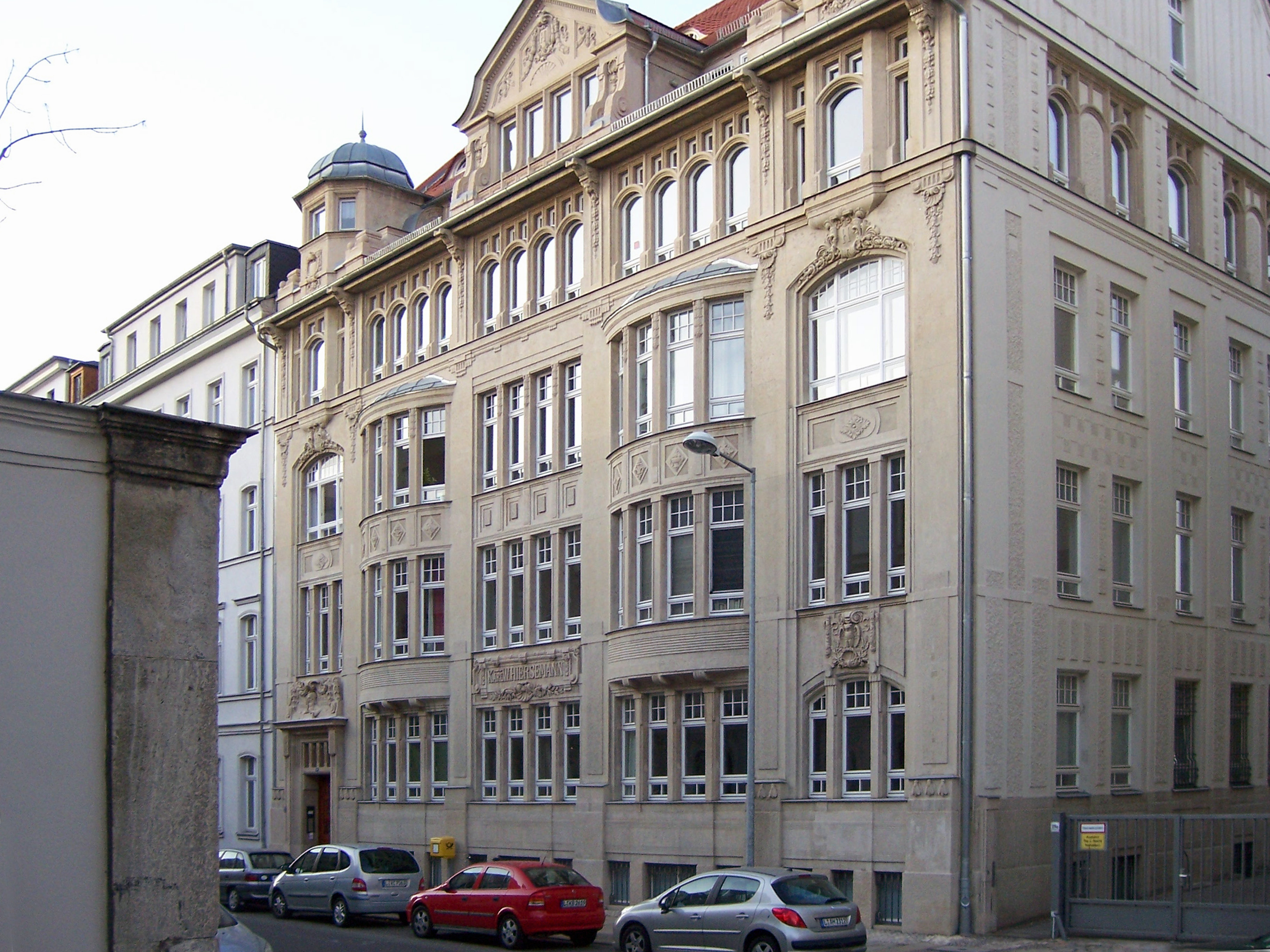
Verlagshaus Hiersemann, Goldschmidtstraße 29 in Leipzig

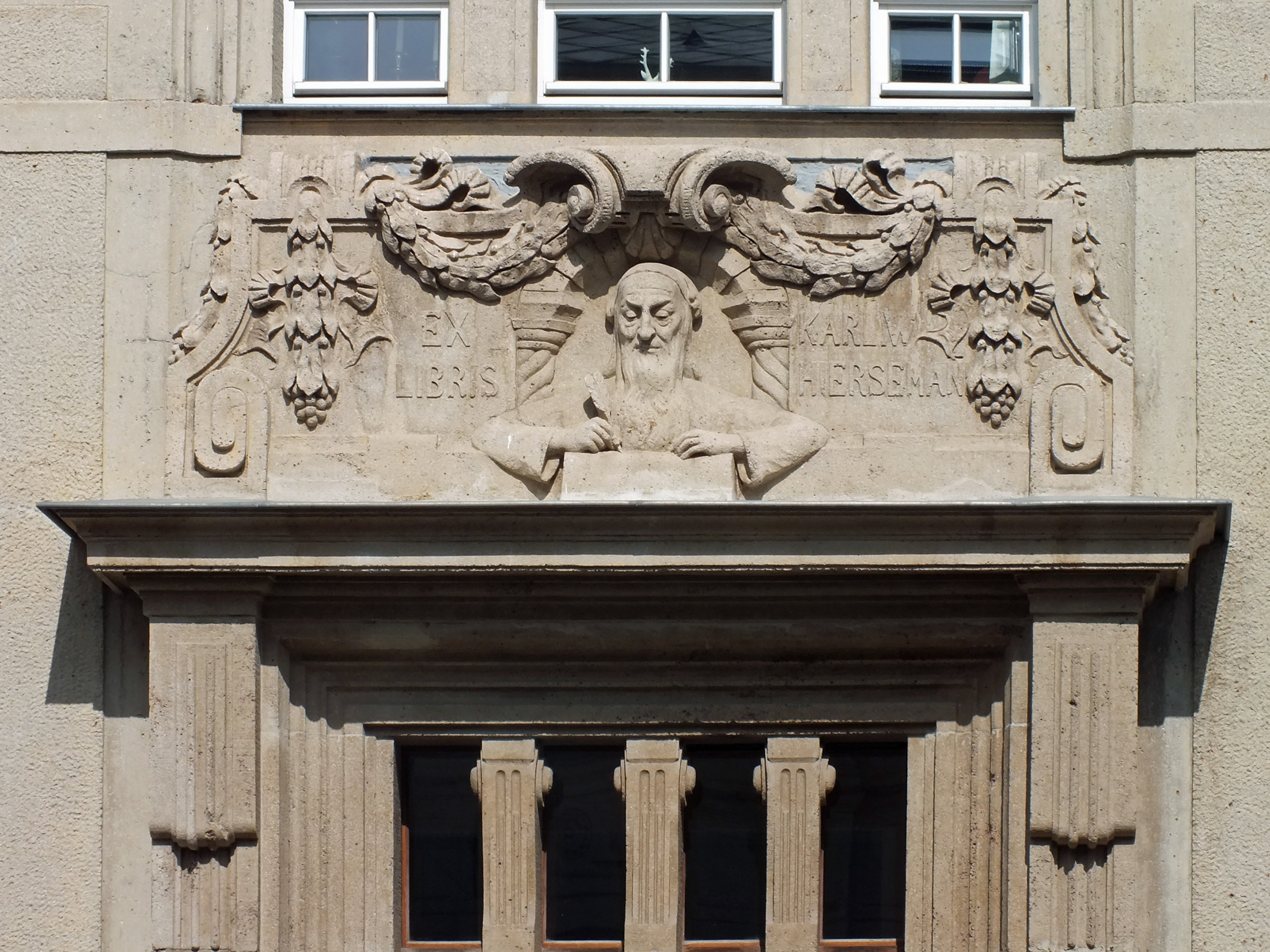
Verlagshaus Hiersemann, Detail

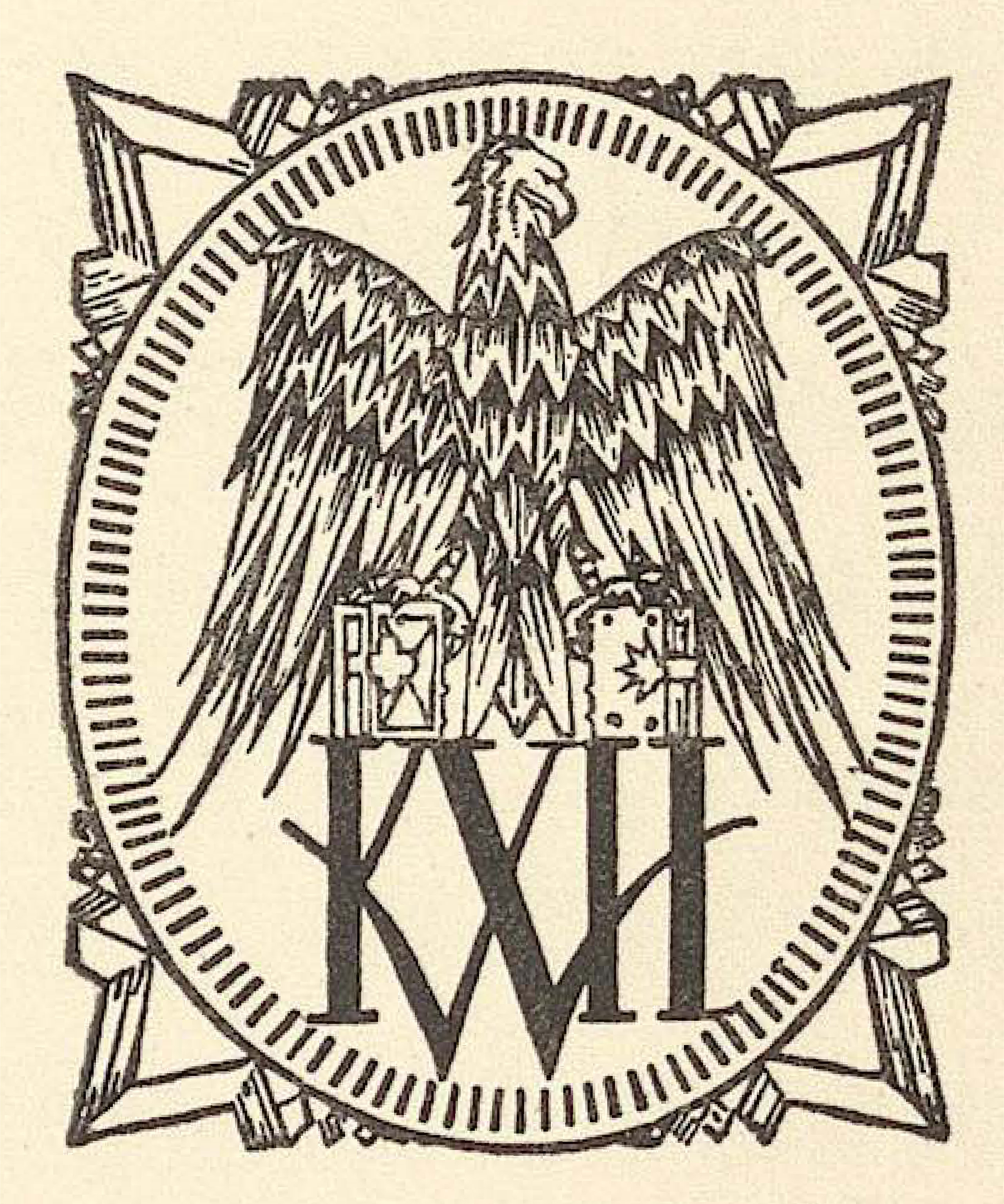
Signet of Karl W. Hiersemann Publishing (1925)

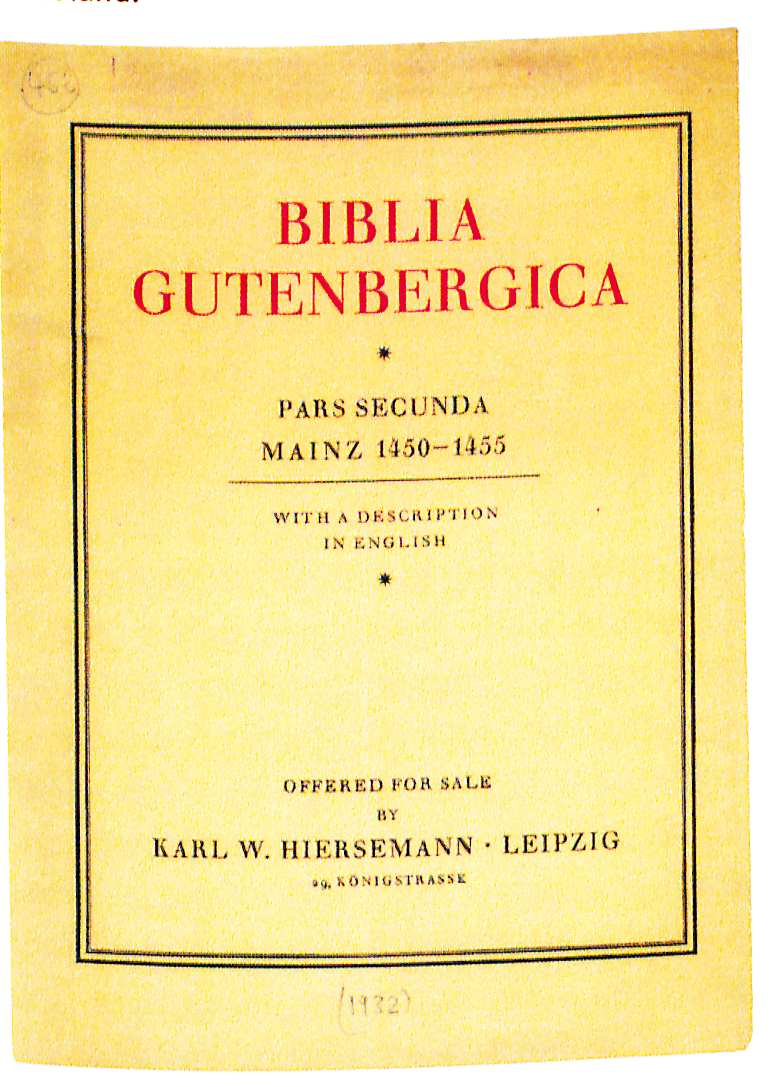
Antiquarian Catalog, 1932

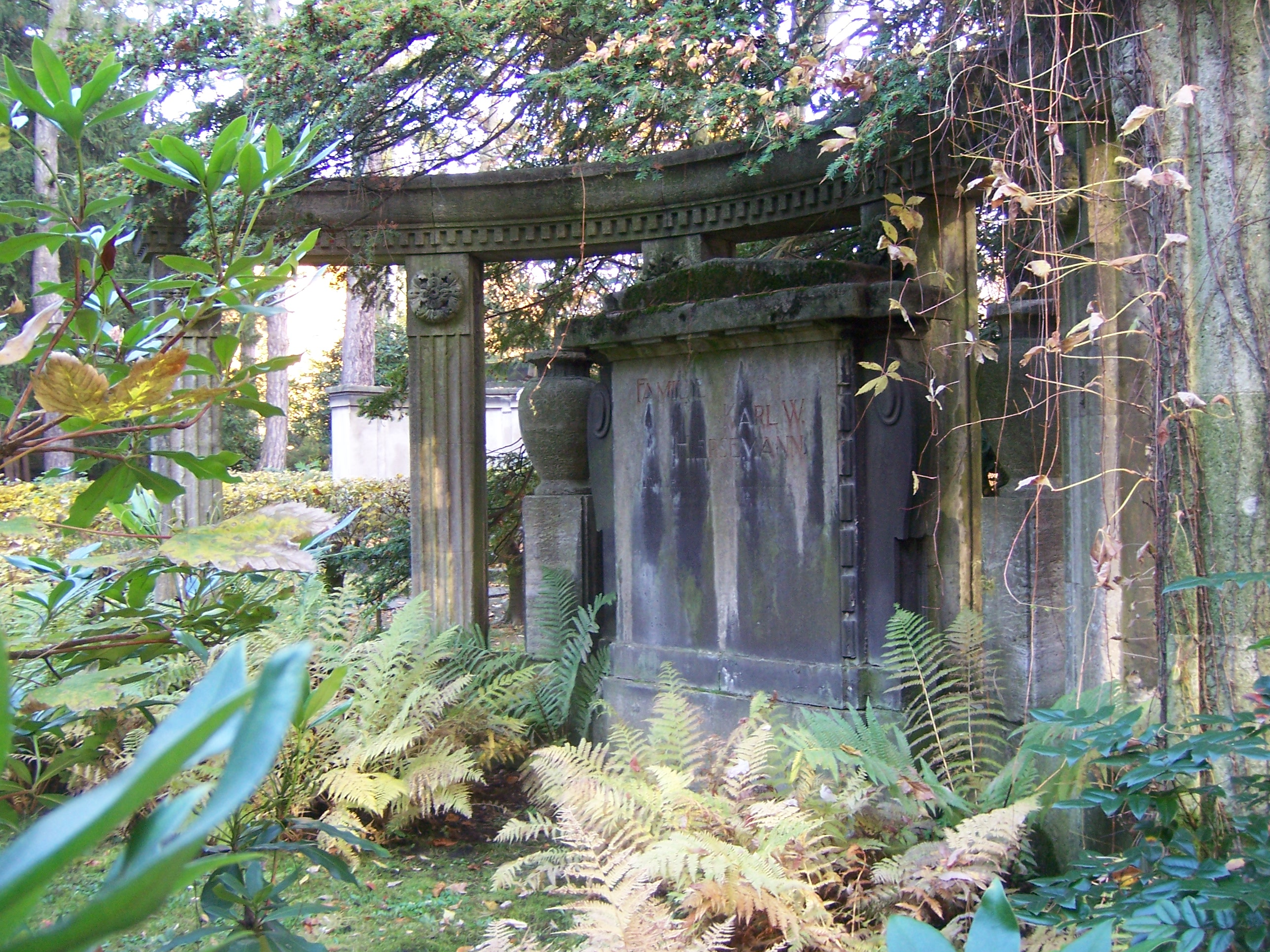
Gravesite of Karl Wilhelm Hiersemann in the Leipzig Südfriedhof
