= Route nationale 30 =

Road in France

The Route nationale 30 is a highway in Picardy and Nord-Pas-de-Calais, northern France. It connects the town of Bapaume to Valenciennes.

Before 1973, The RN 30 was connecting Rouen to La Capelle. The road has been renamed N 31 between Rouen and Gournay-en-Bray and N 29 between Saint-Quentin and La Capelle. It has been downgraded in D 930 between Gournay-en-Bray and Saint-Quentin.

== Route ==
The road starts with a junction of the former N 17 (now the D 1017) in the town of Bapaume. It crosses junction 14 of the A1 autoroute. The road passes a number of war cemeteries and has now been numbered the D 930. After Beaumetz-lès-Cambrai the road becomes the N 30.

The road crosses the A26 autoroute and through the village of Fontaine-Notre-Dame before junction 14 of the A2 autoroute. The road then enters the town of Cambrai. The road has junctions with the N 43, N 44 and N 39.

The road leaves the town to the north west heading through the small town of Iwuy before a junction with the A 2 onto which through traffic is now directed.

A downgraded N 30 continues to the north of the autoroute through Bouchain and crossing to the south to go through Douchy-les-Mines and into the town of Valenciennes. The N 30 continues to the north east passing through the town of Onnaing before reaching the frontier with Belgium. The road continues across the border into the town of Quievrain as the N51.
