= Route nationale 29 =

Road in France

The Route nationale 29 is a highway in Normandy and Picardy, northeast France. It connects the city port of Le Havre with Amiens, Saint-Quentin and the Belgian frontier. Most of the route has been superseded by the A29 autoroute.

== Route ==
The road starts 52 km to the east of Le Havre at Sainte-Marie-des-Champs near Yvetot at a junction with the D 6015 (former N 14). The road (now numbered D 929 heads east crossing the A29 autoroute. It passes the town of Yerville and at Tôtes has a junction with the N 27. The road continues east until Saint-Saëns where a road joins the A 28. The old road is now numbered the D 929 and passes through the town and Forêt d’Eawy. The road joins the old N 28 (now D 928) and heads into the town of Neufchâtel-en-Bray.

North east of Neufchâtel the former N 29 recommences-s at a junction with the A29 autoroute and D 928. Thereafter the road is numbered the D 929 until the town of Aumale where it becomes the D 1029. The road by-passes to the north of the town of Poix-de-Picardie and then turns north-east into the city of Amiens.

The road leaves Amiens to the south-east along the Avre valley before turning east in a long straight road through Villers-Bretonneux and close to a 1st World War memorial to the Australian Army. The road crosses the A1 autoroute at Estrées-Deniécourt. It then passes the old N 17 (now D 1017) and the Canal de la Somme. The road passes more war cemeteries before entering the town of Saint-Quentin over the A26 autoroute. Between Amiens and Longueau, it was the former N 35 and between Longueau and Saint-Quentin, the former N 336.

The road continues over the Somme (still numbered the D 1029) and is now also numbered E 44. The roads cross the Canal de la Sambre à l’Oise. It turns north-east to the town of Guise crossing the River Oise. The road crosses the Forêt du Nouvion before entering the town of La Capelle and a junction with the D 1043 and N 2 close to the frontier with Belgium. Between Saint-Quentin and La Capelle, the road was numbered N 30 before.

At its creation, the N 29 had a different itinary east of Amiens. It was heading to Albert and Bapaume (now as D 929). Then it was heading to Cambrai (now as D 930 in Pas-de-Calais and as D 630 in Nord). Then, to Bouchain, Valenciennes and to the Belgian border (now still as D 630).
