= Saint-Julien-les-Villas =

Commune in Grand Est, France

- Commune
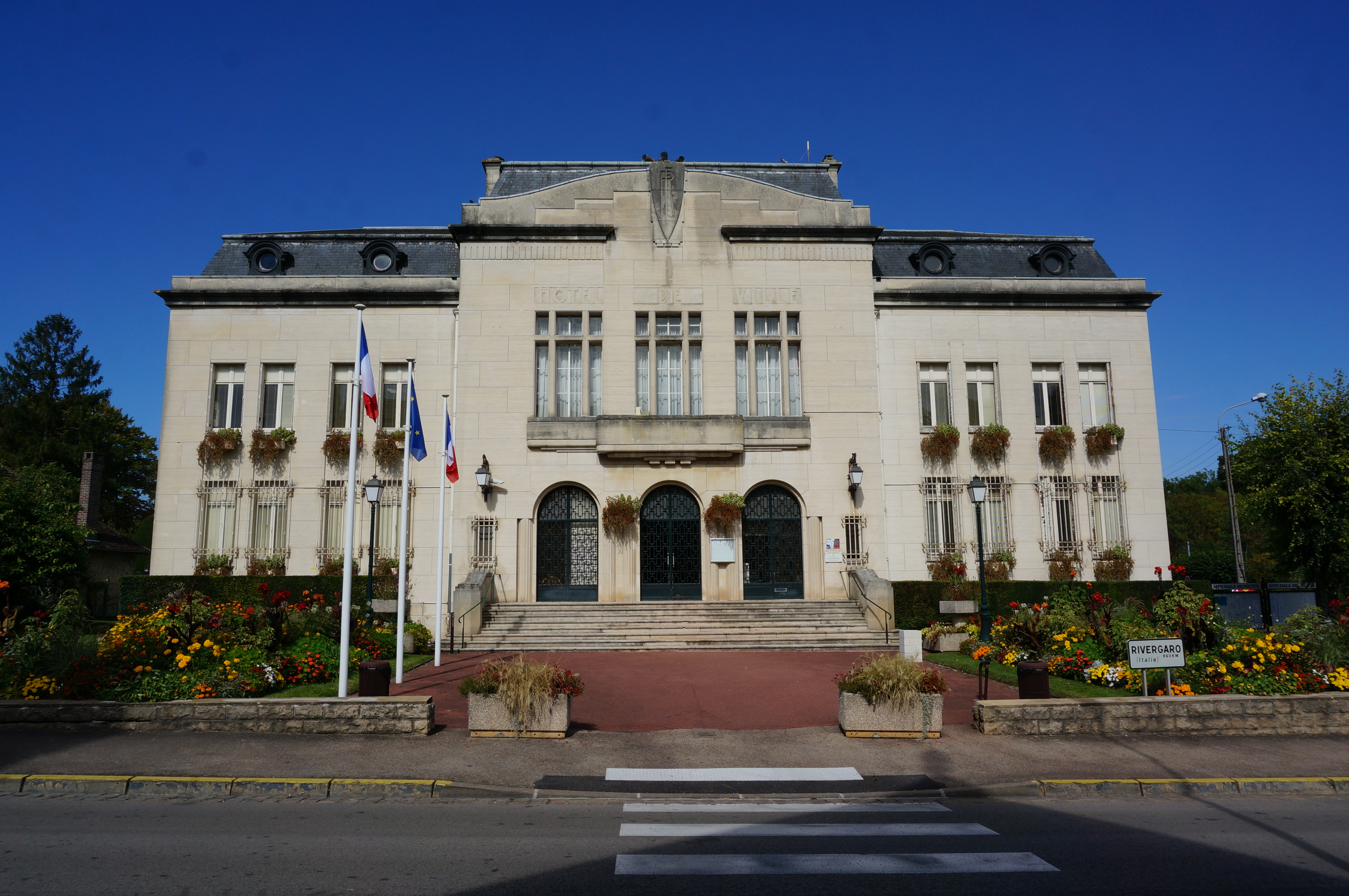
- The town hall in Saint-Julien-les-Villas

- Coat of arms
- Location of Saint-Julien-les-Villas
- Location within France Location within Grand Est
- Coordinates: 48°16′20″N 4°05′54″E
- Country: France
- Region: Grand Est
- Department: Aube
- Arrondissement: Troyes
- Canton: Troyes-4
- Intercommunality: CA Troyes Champagne Métropole

Government
  - Mayor (2020–2026): Jean-Michel Viart
- Area^{1}: 5.26 km^{2} (2.03 sq mi)
- Elevation: 112 m (367 ft)
- Highest elevation: 118 m (387 ft)
- Lowest elevation: 100 m (330 ft)
- Population (2023): 6,760
  - Density: 1,290/km^{2} (3,330/sq mi)
- Time zone: UTC+01:00 (CET)
  - Summer (DST): UTC+02:00 (CEST)
- INSEE/Postal code: 10343 /10800
- ^{1} French Land Register data, which excludes lakes, ponds, glaciers > 1 km^{2} (0.386 sq mi or 247 acres) and river estuaries.

Saint-Julien-les-Villas is a commune in the Aube department in north-central France. Saint-Julien-les-Villas is located in the Grand Est region within the Troyes metropolitan area.

== Geography ==
=== Localization ===
Saint-Julien-les-Villas is a town in the Troyes metropolitan area located south of Troyes. Its residents are known as Sancéens (Sancéennes) after the town's former name, Sancey, which was revived during the French Revolution. The neighboring municipalities are Bréviandes, Rosières-près-Troyes, Rouilly-Saint-Loup, Saint-Parres-aux-Tertres, and Troyes.

=== Toponymy ===
The addition of "Villa" was authorized by the decree of August 5, 1919. It was formerly known as Sancey, then Saint-Julien-Sancey; it was not until the 17th century that the community came to be known simply as Saint-Julien.

=== Hydrography ===
The municipality is located in the hydrographic region known as "la Seine de sa source au confluent de l'Oise (exclu" within the Seine-Normandy basin. It is drained by the Seine, the Saint Julien Canal, the Trevois Canal, the Hurande, the Triffoire, the Gentilly Canal, and Champ Brûlé Canal, the Flotteurs Canal, the Fontaine, and Old Seine, and the Notre-Dame River.

The Seine, a 775-km-long river, flows through the Paris Basin and notably through the department of Aube, crossing it from southeast to northwest. It irrigates the central part of the municipality.

=== Climate ===
Several studies have been conducted to characterize the climate types found across France. The resulting climate zones vary depending on the methods used, the nature and number of parameters considered, the spatial resolution of the data, and the reference period. In 2010, the municipality's climate was classified as a modified oceanic climate of the central and northern plains according to the National Center for Scientific Research (CNRS). This was based on a method combining climate data and environmental factors (e.g., topography, land use) and data covering the period 1971-2000. In 2020, the predominant climate was classified as a Cfb according to the Köppen-Geiger climate classification for the period of 1988-2017, namely a temperate climate with cool summers and no dry season. Furthermore, in 2020, Météo-France published a new typology of climates in metropolitan France in which the municipality is exposed to a modified oceanic climate and is located in the Lorraine, Langres Plateau, and Morvan climate region, characterized by a harsh winter (1.5 °C), moderate winds, and frequent fog in the fall and winter. It is also classified as a zone H1b under the 2020 environmental regulations for the new construction.

For the period 1971-2000, the average annual temperature was 10.6 °C, with an annual temperature range of 4.2 °C. The average annual precipitation is 698mm, with 11.3 days of precipitation in January and 7.8 days in July. For the period 1991-2020, the average annual temperature observed by the nearest Météo-France weather station, located in the municipality of Barberey-Saint-Sulpice 9 km away, is 11.3 °C, and the average annual precipitation is 644.6mm. The highest recorded temperature at this state was 31.8 °C; the lowest recorded temperature was -23 °C, on 17 January 1985.

== Urban Planning ==
=== Classification ===
As of 1 January 2024, Saint-Julien-les-Villas is categorized as a major urban center, according to the new 7-level municipality density classification system established by the National Institute of Statistics and Economic Studies (INSEE) in 2022. It is part of the Troyes urban area, an intra-departmental metropolitan area of which it is a suburban municipality. Furthermore, the municipality is part of the Troyes catchment area, of which it is a municipality within the main hub. This area, which comprises 209 municipalities, is classified among those with a population of 200,000 to less than 700,000 habitants.

=== Land usage ===
The land use of the municipality, as shown by the European biophysical land cover database Corine Land Cover (CLC), is characterized by a high proportion of urbanized areas (61.8% in 2018), an increase from 1990 (55.8%). The detailed breakdown in 2018 is as follows: urban areas (58.1%), arable land (21.8%), mixed agricultural areas (11.3%), forests (5.1%), non-agricultural artificial green spaces (2.1%), industrial or commercial areas and transportation networks (1.6%).

== History ==
The seigniory of the town of Sancey belonged to the Count of Champagne, who donated it upon its establishment to the Chapter of Saint-Étienne of Troyes in 1157.

The Knights Templar of the Troyes Commandery had a seigneurial residence located next to the church but on the opposite bank of the Seine, which corresponded to this seigniory. It featured an enclosed courtyard and a dovecote on 34 arpents of land.

There were also mills that utilized the Saint-Julien spillway on the Seine. These mills were destroyed during the Hundred Years' War. Jean Le Bé, a paper maker from Troyes, leased the mill from Commander Jacques Sarpe. He also obtained the right to raise the needle dam on the Seine from Baliff Jean de Soissons; indeed, the dam was also of great importance for regulating the Seine for Troyes and downstream areas.

In 1480, there were seven mills: two paper mills, two fulling mills and two grain mills. In 1602, the paper mills passed from the Nivelle heirs to Jean Gouault and Guillaume Journée, respectively.

On November 12, 1680, the ruined mills, unable to find tenants, were sold for their materials; they were not rebuilt until the period from 1690 to 1709 by André Fariat.

The Temple House of Sancey and the associated fief were transferred to the Knights Hospitaller in 1313 and remained part of the Commandery of Troyes. In 1507, the estate of Nicolas Ludot included two paper mills, two grain mills, and bark mill, and cloth-beating mill.

In 1789, the village was under the jurisdiction of Intendance and Châlons, and the balliwick of Troyes.

== Population ==
Historical population
Year	Pop.	±% p.a.
1968	5,185	—
1975	5,926	+1.93%
1982	5,809	−0.28%
1990	6,027	+0.46%
1999	6,420	+0.70%
2007	6,741	+0.61%
2012	6,895	+0.45%
2017	6,811	−0.24%
2023	6,760	−0.13%
Source: INSEE

== See also ==
- Communes of the Aube department

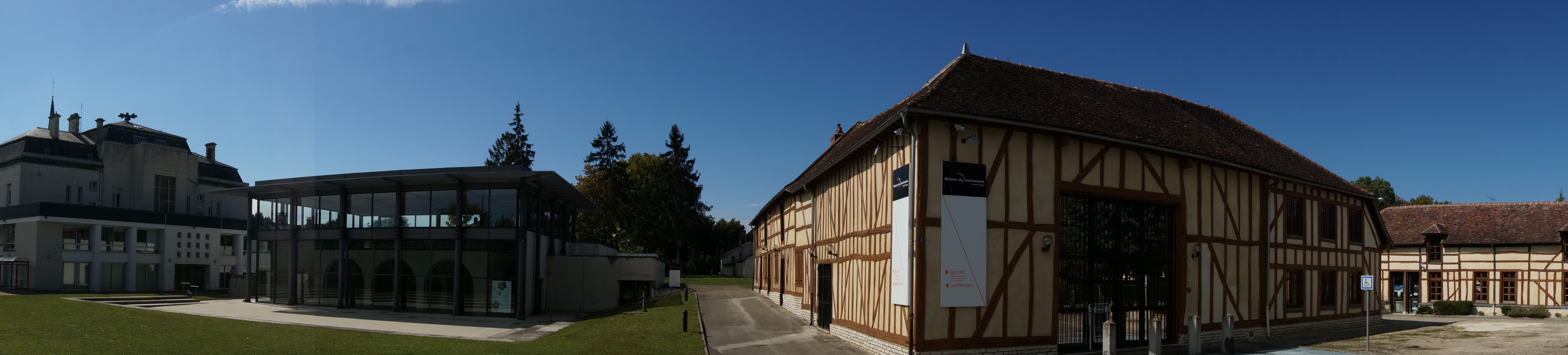
Museum, library, Townhall
