= N28 =

N28 may refer to:

- N28 (Long Island bus)
- Beechcraft N28 Kalkara, an American target drone used by Australia
- London Buses route N28
- N28 road (Ireland)
- Nieuport 28, a French First World War fighter aircraft
- Route nationale 28, in France
- Sun-rising (hieroglyph)
