= Guy Péqueux =

French painter (1942–2021)

- Born: 18 June 1942; Montmorillon, France
- Died: 7 January 2021 (aged 78); Bréviandes, France
- Occupation: Painter

Guy Péqueux (18 June 1942 – 7 January 2021) was a French painter and lithographer.

== Biography ==
Péqueux was born in Montmorillon during World War II. A poor student, he discovered painting while staying with his grandmother in Chaumont-Porcien. From 1960 to 1965, he exhibited his early paintings in Montparnasse and met Michel Kikoine, Pinchus Kremegne, and Lazare Volovick. He then showed exhibitions in Bar-le-Duc, Beaulieu-en-Argonne, and Nancy before starting a series of personal exhibitions in Troyes in 1966, where he befriended Paul Rebeyrolle.

Péqueux solidified his style of expressionism in trips to the Nordic countries, Russia, the Caucasus, the Middle East, Africa, and Greece. The blue colors in his works were typically seen as symbolism for the cold of Scandinavia, while the ochre and red were depicted from the heat of Jordan and the Sahara Desert.

Péqueux died in Bréviandes on 7 January 2021 at the age of 78.

== Book illustrations ==
- À la fuite de quoi, Un carnet du couchant, Les Étoffes de l'auprès, Survol animal entre 7 et 8 by Florian Chantôme (2005)

== Collections ==
Péqueux's work is held in the following public collections:

- Musée des beaux-arts de Troyes, Structure de paysage
- Musée Dubois-Boucher, Nogent-sur-Seine
- Department of Prints and Photography of the National Library of France
