= Route nationale 17 =

Road in France

The Route nationale 17, or RN17, is a trunk road (nationale) in France connecting Paris to the border with Belgium.

== Reclassification ==
The majority of the route runs close to the A1 autoroute. As a result, north of Senlis the road has been downgraded and re-classified as the RD1017 and RD917. There is a small section of the RN17 remaining between Arras and Lille.

== Route ==
Paris-Senlis-Arras-Lens-Lille-Belgium

=== Paris to Senlis (0 km – 31 km) ===
The road starts north of Paris as a branch of the RN2, opposite the Airport Paris-Le Bourget, and heads north east as the Av du Mai 1985 and then Route de Flandre. The road skirts the western edge of the Charles de Gaulle Airport, crosses the RD104 and then through open countryside.

After the village of Survillers the road enters the Parc Naturel Régional de Oise Pays de France, the road now passes through the Forêt du Chantilly before reaching the Cathedral City of Senlis.

=== Senlis to Arras (31 km to 162 km) ===
At Senlis, there are junctions with the RN330, RN324 and A1. The road heads north through the Forêt d'Halatte crossing the river Oise at Pont-Sainte-Maxence crosses marsh and woodland before open countryside. There is a junction with the RN31 (E46) between Beauvais and Compiègne. The road then passes the villages of Estrées-Saint-Denis and Cuvilly passing the grounds of the Chateau de Tilloloy. The road crosses the autoroute and heads round the village of Roye. The bypass runs next to war-graves on the bank of the river Avre.

The RN17 then crosses the A29 (E44) and then the RN29 before entering the Somme valley. The road crosses the river at Péronne and continues north over World War I battlefields passing French, British and German cemeteries. The road crosses the A2 and the A1 again before reaching the town of Bapaume. The road then continues north to Arras.

=== Arras to Border with Belgium (162 km to 227 km) ===
At Arras, the road has junctions with the RN25, RN39 and A26 autoroute E15 to Calais. The road crosses the river Scarpe and heads north over the Vimy Ridge past the war memorial to Canadian troops.

The road then reaches the industrial town of Lens, the landscape is dotted with slag heaps from the coal mines nearby. In Lens through traffic takes the A211 autoroute and then the A21 autoroute. The town is also served by the RN43 and RN47. Thereafter the RN17 heads northeast to Carvin and leads onto the A1 autoroute E17. The old RN17 is now the RD925 through Seclin into the city of Lille.

After Lille, the road heads north from the City Centre passing west of Tourcoing and onto Halluin where the road crosses into Belgium over the river Lys where the road becomes the RN32.
