= A2 autoroute =

Controlled-access highway from Combles to the Belgian A7

A2 autoroute

Route information
- Part of E19
- Maintained by SANEF
- Length: 78 km (48 mi)
- Existed: 1972–present

Major junctions
- South-West end: E15 / E19 / A 1 in Combles

- E17 / A 26 in Cambrai; A 21 in Douchy-les-Mines; A 23 in La Sentinelle
- North-East end: E19 / A7 in Saint-Aybert (Belgium)

Location
- Country: France

Highway system
- Roads in France; Autoroutes; Routes nationales

The A2 Autoroute is a French autoroute that travels 76 km (47 mi) from the A1 near the commune of Combles in Picardy to the border with Belgium, where it continues on as the Belgian motorway A7. The entire length is concurrently designated as European route E19.

In conjunction with the A1 autoroute and the Belgian A7 it is the main route between Paris and Brussels. Until other more direct motorway routes are completed it is also the fastest route from Paris to the Belgian city of Liège.

From Combles to Cambrai, the autoroute is managed by the Société des Autoroutes du Nord et de l'Est de la France (SANEF) and is a toll road, with no exits on the southernmost 22.8 kilometres (14.2 mi) of the A2 between the A1 and the A26 at Graincourt-lès-Havrincourt. From Cambrai onward it is a non-toll autoroute managed by the government of the Nord department. Two lanes travel in each direction.

The A2 was opened in two stages in 1972. The first stage from junction 15 to the Belgian border opened on 28 March. The remainder, from Junction 15 to the interchange with the A1 opened on 19 December 1972.

== List of exits and junctions ==
Region	Department	km	mi	Junctions	Destinations	Notes
Hauts-de-France	Somme	0.0	0.0	A1 - A2	Paris, Charles-de-Gaulle, Senlis, Compiègne, Amiens (A29)	Entry and Exit from A1 Paris
Hauts-de-France	Pas-de-Calais					
Hauts-de-France	Pas-de-Calais	Aire de Rocquigny (Northbound); Aire de Barastre (Southbound)				
Hauts-de-France	Pas-de-Calais	Aire d'Havrincourt (Northbound); Aire de Graincourt (Southbound)				
Hauts-de-France	Pas-de-Calais	22	13.6	A26 - A2	Reims, Saint-Quentin, Lille (A1), Arras, Laon, Calais, Lyon (A5)	
Hauts-de-France	Nord	27	16.7	14 : Cambrai	Cambrai- ouest, Bapaume	
Hauts-de-France	Nord	Péage de Thun-l'Évêque				
Hauts-de-France	Nord	40	24.8	15 : Hordain	Amiens, Saint-Quentin, Cambrai - nord, Bouchain, Aniche, Hordain, Iwuy, Z. I. Hordain	
Hauts-de-France	Nord	42	26.1	16 : Bouchain	Bouchain, Hordain, Lieu-Saint-Amand, Parc d'Activités Jean Monnet	Entry and exit from Belgium
Hauts-de-France	Nord	43	26.7	17 : Douchy-les-Mines	Douchy-les-Mines, Neuville-sur-Escaut	Entry and Exit from Paris
Hauts-de-France	Nord	45	27.9	A21 - A2	Denain - Nouveau-Monde, Douai, Escaudain, Somain, Aniche	
Hauts-de-France	Nord	48	29.8	18 : Denain	Denain- centre, Haulchin, Douchy-les-Mines Z. I. Thiant	
Hauts-de-France	Nord	51	31.6	19 : Z. I. Prouvy-Rouvignies	Aéroport de Valenciennes-Denain, Centre Routier, Douanier	Exit from Paris
Hauts-de-France	Nord	53	32.9	20 : La Sentinelle	Valenciennes - Le Vignoble, La Sentinelle, Trith-Saint-Léger, Anzin, Z. I. Prouvy-Rouvignies, Aérodrome, Centre Routier	
Hauts-de-France	Nord	53	32.9	20 : La Sentinelle	Aires de La Sentinelle	
Hauts-de-France	Nord	54	33.5	A23 - A2	Lille, Saint-Amand-les-Eaux, Valenciennes - Saint-Waast, Le Vignoble, Anzin, Centre Hospitalier	
Hauts-de-France	Nord	55	34.1	21/21a/21b : Valenciennes - centre	Marly, Valenciennes, Solesmes, Le Cateau, Aulnoy-lez-Valenciennes, Universités	
Hauts-de-France	Nord	57	35.4	22a : Maubeuge	Maubeuge, Bavay, Le Quesnoy	Entry and Exit from Paris
Hauts-de-France	Nord	57	35.4	22b : Marly	Valenciennes - Le Roleur, Marly, Z. I. Marly 1	Entry and Exit from Paris
Hauts-de-France	Nord	59	36.6	23 : Saint-Saulve	Marly, Valenciennes, Saint-Saulve, Z. I. Marly 2, Maubeuge, Bavay, Le Quesnoy	
Hauts-de-France	Nord	62	38.5	23.1 : Sebourg	Sebourg, Parc d'Activités de la Vallée de l'Escaut - sud	
Hauts-de-France	Nord	64	39.7	24 : Onnaing	Onnaing, Parc d'Activités de la Vallée de l'Escaut - nord	
Hauts-de-France	Nord	69	42.8	25 : Vicq	Vicq, Quiévrechain, Condé-sur-l'Escaut, Fresnes-sur-Escaut, Quarouble, Bruay-sur-l'Escaut, Saint-Saulve - Z. I.	
Hauts-de-France	Nord	Aire d'Enclosis (Southbound)				
Hauts-de-France	Nord	74	45.9	26 : Crespin	Crespin, Saint-Aybert, Thivencelle	Entry and Exit from Paris
Hauts-de-France	Nord	Aire de Saint-Aybert (Northbound)				
French - Belgian Border ; E19 / A 2 becomes Belgian road A7 E19 / A7
1.000 mi = 1.609 km; 1.000 km = 0.621 mi
