= Oisy, Nord =

Oisy
- Commune
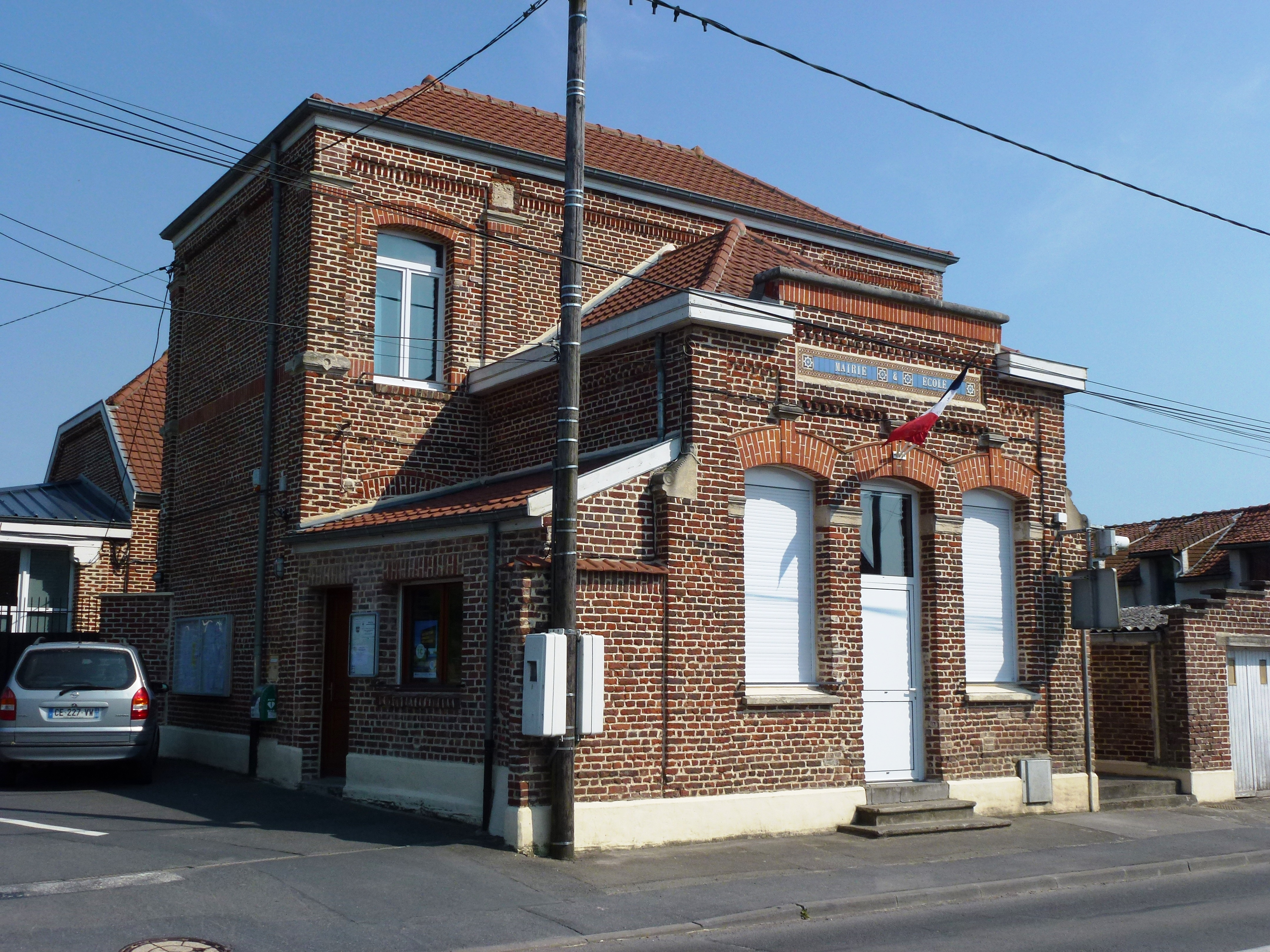
- The town hall in Oisy

- Coat of arms
- Location of Oisy
- Location within France Location within Hauts-de-France
- Coordinates: 50°21′35″N 3°26′24″E
- Country: France
- Region: Hauts-de-France
- Department: Nord
- Arrondissement: Valenciennes
- Canton: Aulnoy-lez-Valenciennes
- Intercommunality: CA Porte du Hainaut

Government
  - Mayor (2020–2026): Bruno Lejeune
- Area^{1}: 2.57 km^{2} (0.99 sq mi)
- Elevation: 34 m (112 ft)
- Highest elevation: 45 m (148 ft)
- Lowest elevation: 24 m (79 ft)
- Population (2023): 699
  - Density: 272/km^{2} (704/sq mi)
- Time zone: UTC+01:00 (CET)
  - Summer (DST): UTC+02:00 (CEST)
- INSEE/Postal code: 59446 /59195
- ^{1} French Land Register data, which excludes lakes, ponds, glaciers > 1 km^{2} (0.386 sq mi or 247 acres) and river estuaries.

Oisy (French pronunciation: [wazi]) is a commune in the Nord department in northern France.

== Heraldry ==
Arms of Oisy	The arms of Oisy are blazoned : Quarterly 1&4: Argent, a fess sable; 2&3: Or, a cross moline sable. (Bellaing, Oisy and Preux-au-Bois use the same arms.)

== See also ==
- Communes of the Nord department
