= Canton of Troyes-4 =

Coordinates: 48°17′N 4°06′E

- Canton
- Situation of the canton of Troyes-4 in the department of Aube
- Country: France
- Region: Grand Est
- Department: Aube
- No. of communes: {{{nbcomm}}}
- Population (2023): 22,307
- INSEE code: 1015

The canton of Troyes-4 is a canton of the Aube department, in northern France. Since the French canton reorganisation which came into effect in March 2015, the communes of the canton of Troyes-4 are:

1. Pont-Sainte-Marie
2. Saint-Julien-les-Villas
3. Saint-Parres-aux-Tertres
4. Troyes (partly)
