= Prouvy =

- Commune
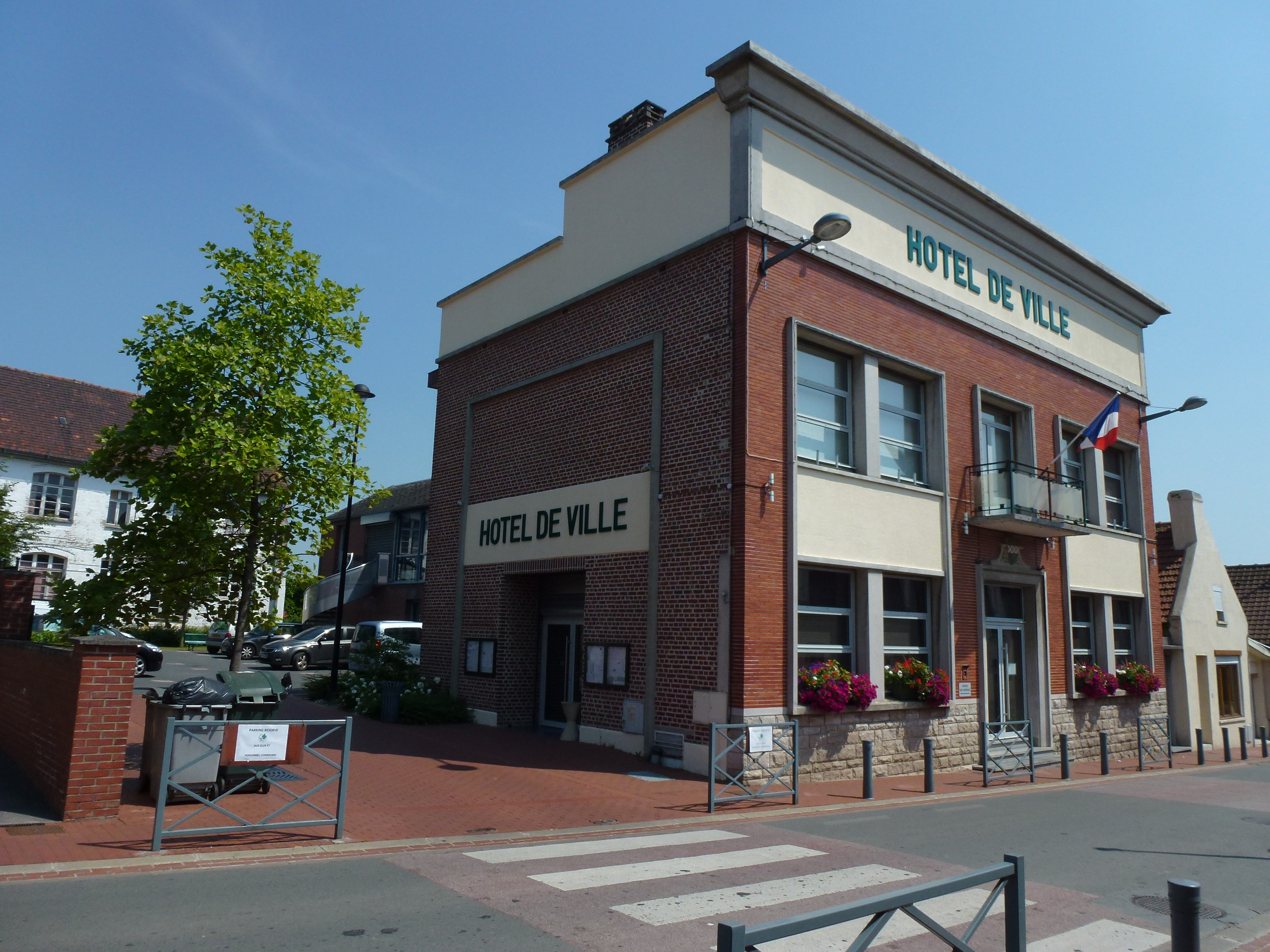
- The town hall in Prouvy

- Coat of arms
- Location of Prouvy
- Location within France Location within Hauts-de-France
- Coordinates: 50°19′16″N 3°27′04″E
- Country: France
- Region: Hauts-de-France
- Department: Nord
- Arrondissement: Valenciennes
- Canton: Aulnoy-lez-Valenciennes
- Intercommunality: CA Valenciennes Métropole

Government
  - Mayor (2020–2026): Isabelle Choain
- Area^{1}: 4.41 km^{2} (1.70 sq mi)
- Elevation: 28 m (92 ft)
- Highest elevation: 62 m (203 ft)
- Lowest elevation: 25 m (82 ft)
- Population (2023): 2,178
  - Density: 494/km^{2} (1,280/sq mi)
- Time zone: UTC+01:00 (CET)
  - Summer (DST): UTC+02:00 (CEST)
- INSEE/Postal code: 59475 /59121
- ^{1} French Land Register data, which excludes lakes, ponds, glaciers > 1 km^{2} (0.386 sq mi or 247 acres) and river estuaries.

Prouvy (French pronunciation: [pʁuvi]) is a commune in the Nord department in northern France.

== Population ==
Historical population
Year	Pop.	±% p.a.
1968	2,235	—
1975	2,168	−0.43%
1982	2,133	−0.23%
1990	2,474	+1.87%
1999	2,375	−0.45%
2007	2,386	+0.06%
2012	2,269	−1.00%
2017	2,282	+0.11%
2023	2,178	−0.77%
Source: INSEE

== Heraldry ==
Arms of Prouvy	The arms of Prouvy are blazoned : Or, a tressure flory vert, overall a fess gules fretty argent.

== See also ==
- Communes of the Nord department
