= Bellaing =

- Commune
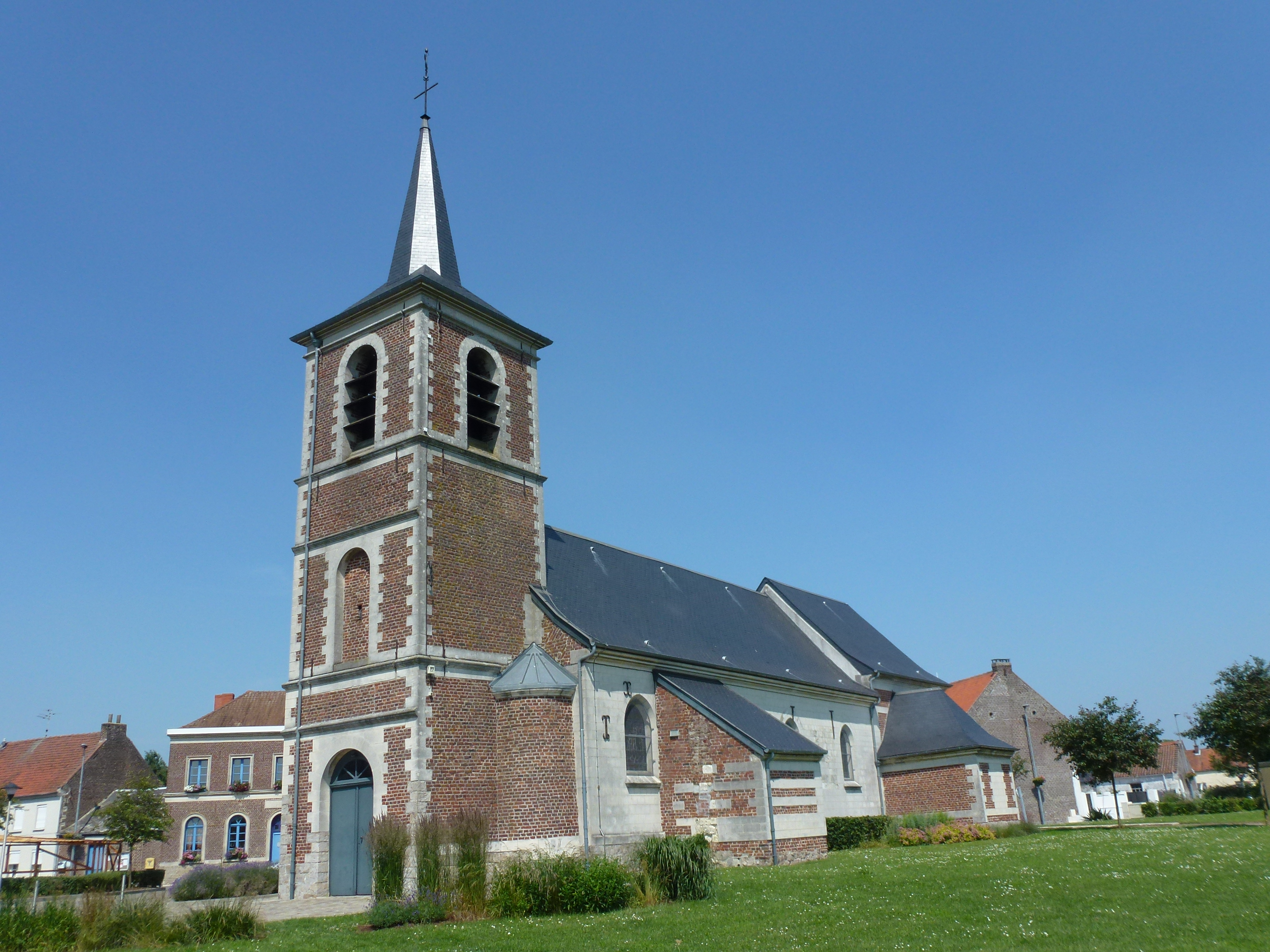
- The church in Bellaing

- Coat of arms
- Location of Bellaing
- Location within France Location within Hauts-de-France
- Coordinates: 50°22′09″N 3°25′36″E
- Country: France
- Region: Hauts-de-France
- Department: Nord
- Arrondissement: Valenciennes
- Canton: Aulnoy-lez-Valenciennes
- Intercommunality: CA Porte du Hainaut

Government
  - Mayor (2020–2026): Michel Blaise
- Area^{1}: 3.42 km^{2} (1.32 sq mi)
- Elevation: 42 m (138 ft)
- Highest elevation: 47 m (154 ft)
- Lowest elevation: 21 m (69 ft)
- Population (2023): 1,301
  - Density: 380/km^{2} (985/sq mi)
- Time zone: UTC+01:00 (CET)
  - Summer (DST): UTC+02:00 (CEST)
- INSEE/Postal code: 59064 /59135
- ^{1} French Land Register data, which excludes lakes, ponds, glaciers > 1 km^{2} (0.386 sq mi or 247 acres) and river estuaries.

Bellaing (French pronunciation: [bɛlɛ̃]) is a commune in the Nord department in northern France.

== Population ==
Historical population
Year	Pop.	±% p.a.
1968	1,225	—
1975	1,298	+0.83%
1982	1,555	+2.61%
1990	1,335	−1.89%
1999	1,305	−0.25%
2007	1,231	−0.73%
2012	1,177	−0.89%
2017	1,239	+1.03%
2023	1,301	+0.82%
Source: INSEE

== Heraldry ==
Arms of Bellaing	The arms of Bellaing are blazoned : Quarterly 1&4: Argent, a fess sable; 2&3: Or, a cross moline sable. (Bellaing, Oisy and Preux-au-Bois use the same arms.)

== See also ==
- Communes of the Nord department
