= Route nationale 216 =

Road in France

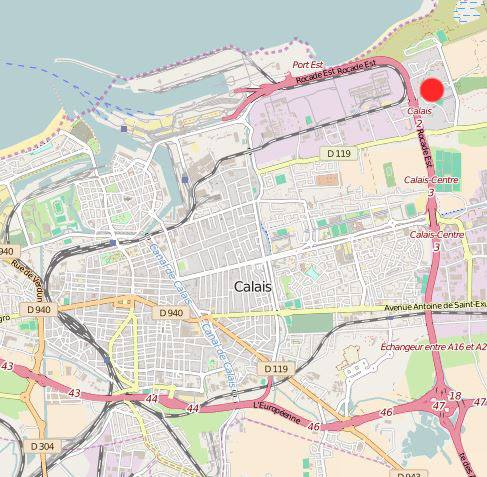
Location of the N216. The Calais Jungle is highlighted in red.

Route Nationale 216, also known as the Rocade Est or Rocade Portuaire, is a French trunk road that connects the long-distance A-16 and A-26 autoroutes to the Calais ferries towards the United Kingdom. From the interchange with the A-16, A-26, the road runs northward, connecting to Rue Yervant Toumaniantz at exit 3, and the Rue de Garennes at exit 2. The northern terminus is at an interchange which connects directly to the ferry terminal, along with an exit for local traffic. The southern 2.5km from junction 3 to the A16/A26 interchange has been upgraded to autoroute standard and is now marked A216.

As the main road towards the Port of Calais, the N216 is notorious for migrants attempting to enter the United Kingdom. Since the installation of the Calais Jungle, a number of migrants trying to enter the UK by climbing aboard vehicles have been killed on this road, including 5 deaths in 2016. A second, unofficial camp was set up to the east of the N216 by the curve at exit 2 in 2015. The road is regularly blocked by the migrants with felled trees and other objects in an effort to stop the vehicles to enable them to hide aboard. In response, HGV drivers have been spotted attempting to run over migrants approaching their vehicles on the road.

In 2016, plans were announced to build a 1.9-kilometre (1.2-mile) long wall on either side of the N216 to prevent migrants accessing the road and to improve the surroundings for drivers. The proposal is a joint Anglo-French project, estimated to cost £1.9m. Local residents have dubbed it "the Great Wall of Calais". Construction was completed by the end of the year, but by this point the Jungle had been completely evacuated.
