= Preux-au-Bois =

- Commune
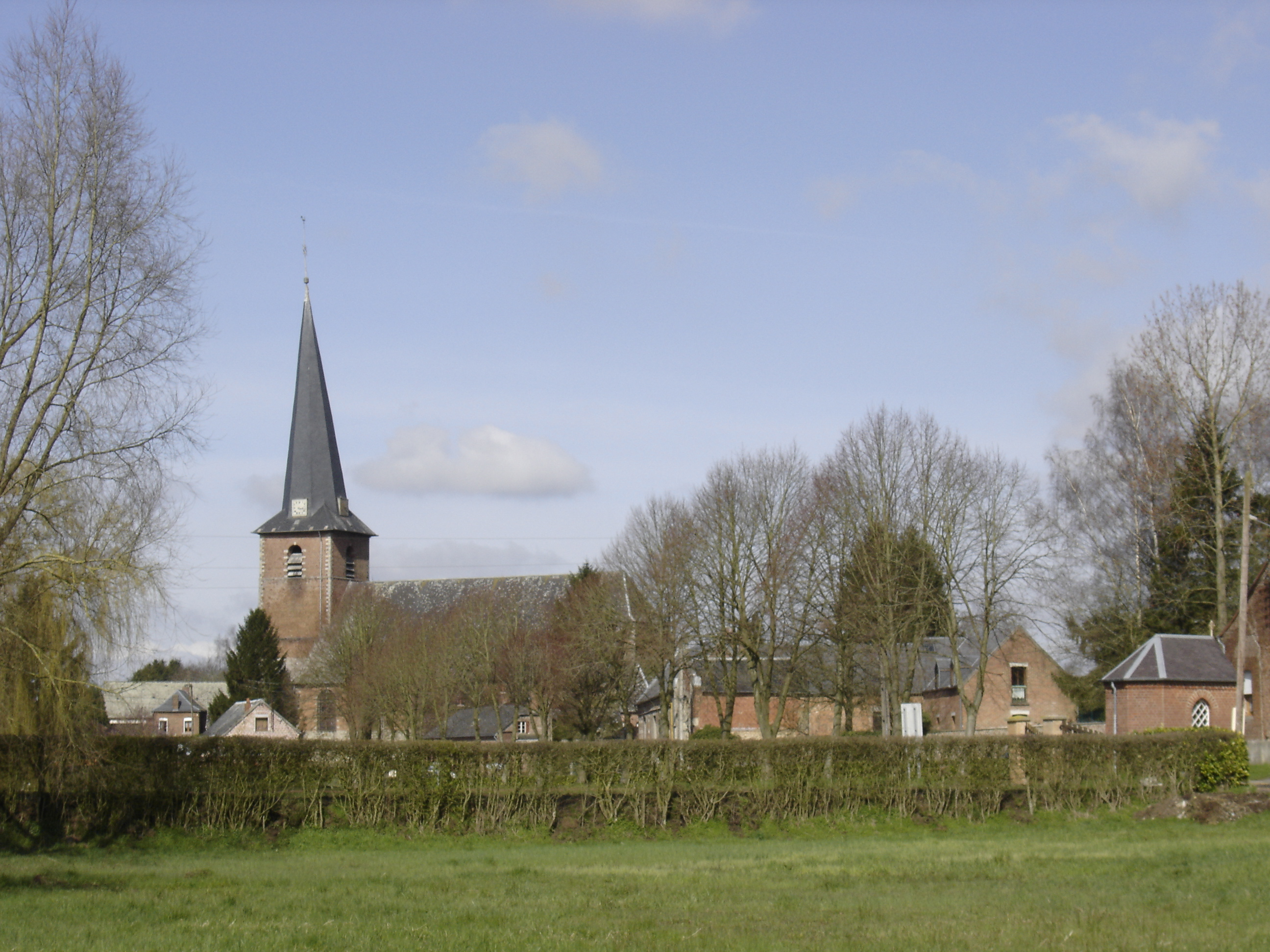
- Saint-Martin church

- Coat of arms
- Location of Preux-au-Bois
- Location within France Location within Hauts-de-France
- Coordinates: 50°09′51″N 3°39′29″E
- Country: France
- Region: Hauts-de-France
- Department: Nord
- Arrondissement: Avesnes-sur-Helpe
- Canton: Avesnes-sur-Helpe
- Intercommunality: CC Pays de Mormal

Government
  - Mayor (2023–2026): David Beaumont
- Area^{1}: 3.99 km^{2} (1.54 sq mi)
- Highest elevation: 160 m (520 ft)
- Lowest elevation: 139 m (456 ft)
- Population (2023): 832
  - Density: 209/km^{2} (540/sq mi)
- Time zone: UTC+01:00 (CET)
  - Summer (DST): UTC+02:00 (CEST)
- INSEE/Postal code: 59472 /59288
- ^{1} French Land Register data, which excludes lakes, ponds, glaciers > 1 km^{2} (0.386 sq mi or 247 acres) and river estuaries.

Preux-au-Bois (French pronunciation: [pʁø o bwa]) is a commune in the Nord department in northern France.

== Heraldry ==
Arms of Preux-au-Bois	The arms of Preux-au-Bois are blazoned : Quarterly 1&4: Argent, a fess sable; 2&3: Or, a cross moline sable. (Bellaing, Oisy and Preux-au-Bois use the same arms.)

== Points of interest ==
- Arboretum de l'Étang David
- There is a Commonwealth War Graves Commission cemetery just outside of the village with graves from World War I and World War II.
- Statue of Louise Thuliez, a French resistance fighter during both World Wars. It was erected in 1970.

== See also ==
- Communes of the Nord department
