= Gournay-en-Bray =

- Commune
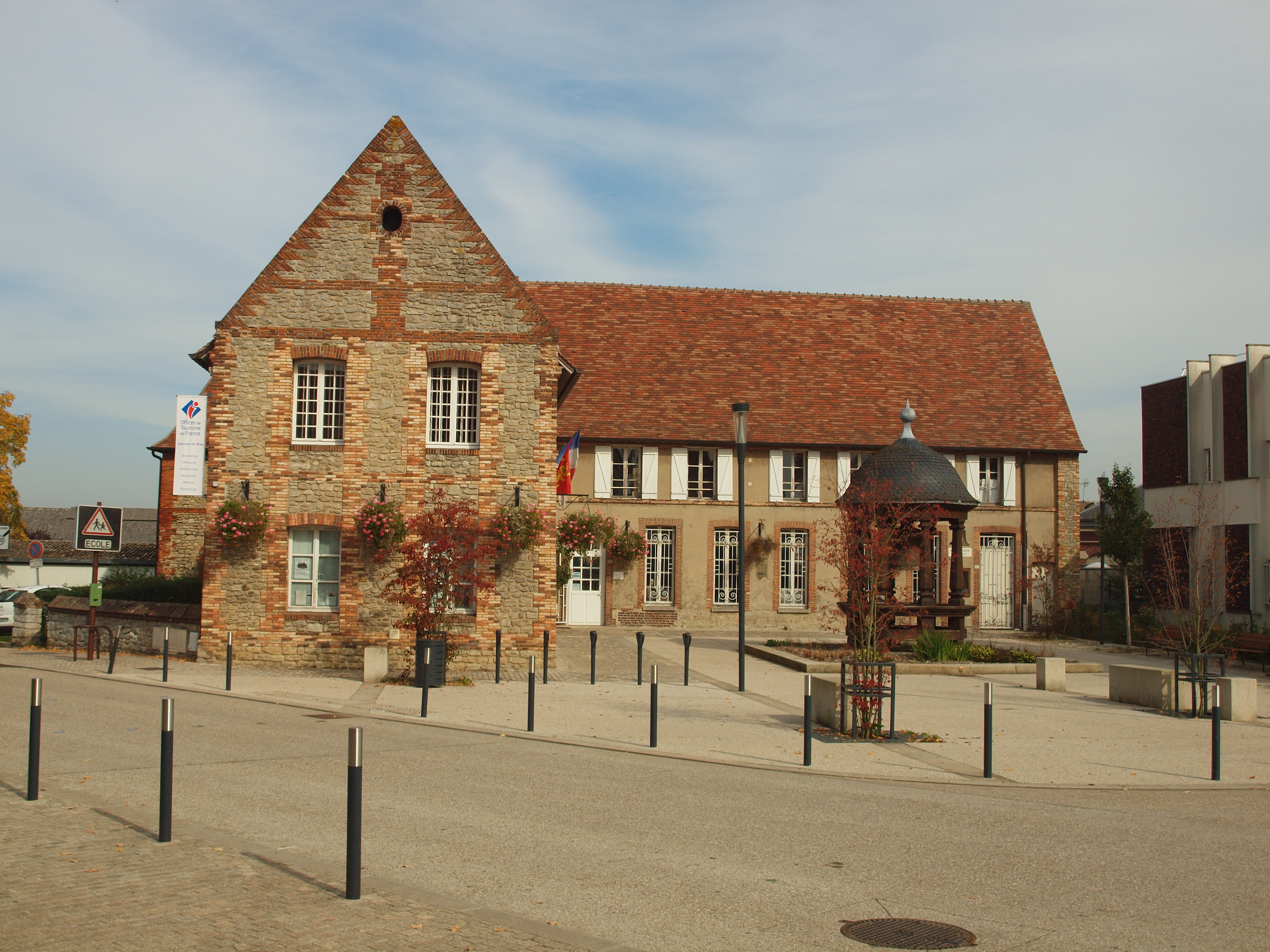
- Tourism office

- Coat of arms
- Location of Gournay-en-Bray
- Location within France Location within Normandy
- Coordinates: 49°28′53″N 1°43′29″E
- Country: France
- Region: Normandy
- Department: Seine-Maritime
- Arrondissement: Dieppe
- Canton: Gournay-en-Bray
- Intercommunality: CC 4 rivières

Government
  - Mayor (2026–32): Éric Picard
- Area^{1}: 10.4 km^{2} (4.0 sq mi)
- Elevation: 94 m (308 ft)
- Highest elevation: 133 m (436 ft)
- Lowest elevation: 84 m (276 ft)
- Population (2023): 5,723
  - Density: 550/km^{2} (1,430/sq mi)
- Time zone: UTC+01:00 (CET)
  - Summer (DST): UTC+02:00 (CEST)
- INSEE/Postal code: 76312 /76220
- ^{1} French Land Register data, which excludes lakes, ponds, glaciers > 1 km^{2} (0.386 sq mi or 247 acres) and river estuaries.

Gournay-en-Bray (French pronunciation: [guʁnɛ ɑ̃ bʁɛ], before 1962: Gournay) is a commune in the Seine-Maritime department in the Normandy region in north-western France.

== Geography ==
A town of farming and light industry, it is situated in the Pays de Bray, some 50 km (31 mi) east of Rouen, at the junction of the N 31, the D 915 and the D 930 roads.
The commune's territory includes three former parish hamlets, near the confluence of the Epte with three other smaller rivers – the Morette, Auchy and Aulnaie.

== Population ==
Historical population
Year	Pop.	±% p.a.
1968	5,791	—
1975	6,430	+1.51%
1982	6,344	−0.19%
1990	6,147	−0.39%
1999	6,275	+0.23%
2007	6,174	−0.20%
2012	6,409	+0.75%
2017	6,072	−1.07%
2023	5,723	−0.98%
Source: INSEE

== Heraldry ==
Arms of Gournay-en-Bray	The arms of Gournay-en-Bray are blazoned: Sable, an armed knight contourny maintaining in his right hand a lance argent, and in chief a fleur-de-lys Or. The traditional armoury of the Counts of Gournay seems to have been Sable simple (a pure black shield with nothing on it), hence the sable field here.

== Places of interest ==
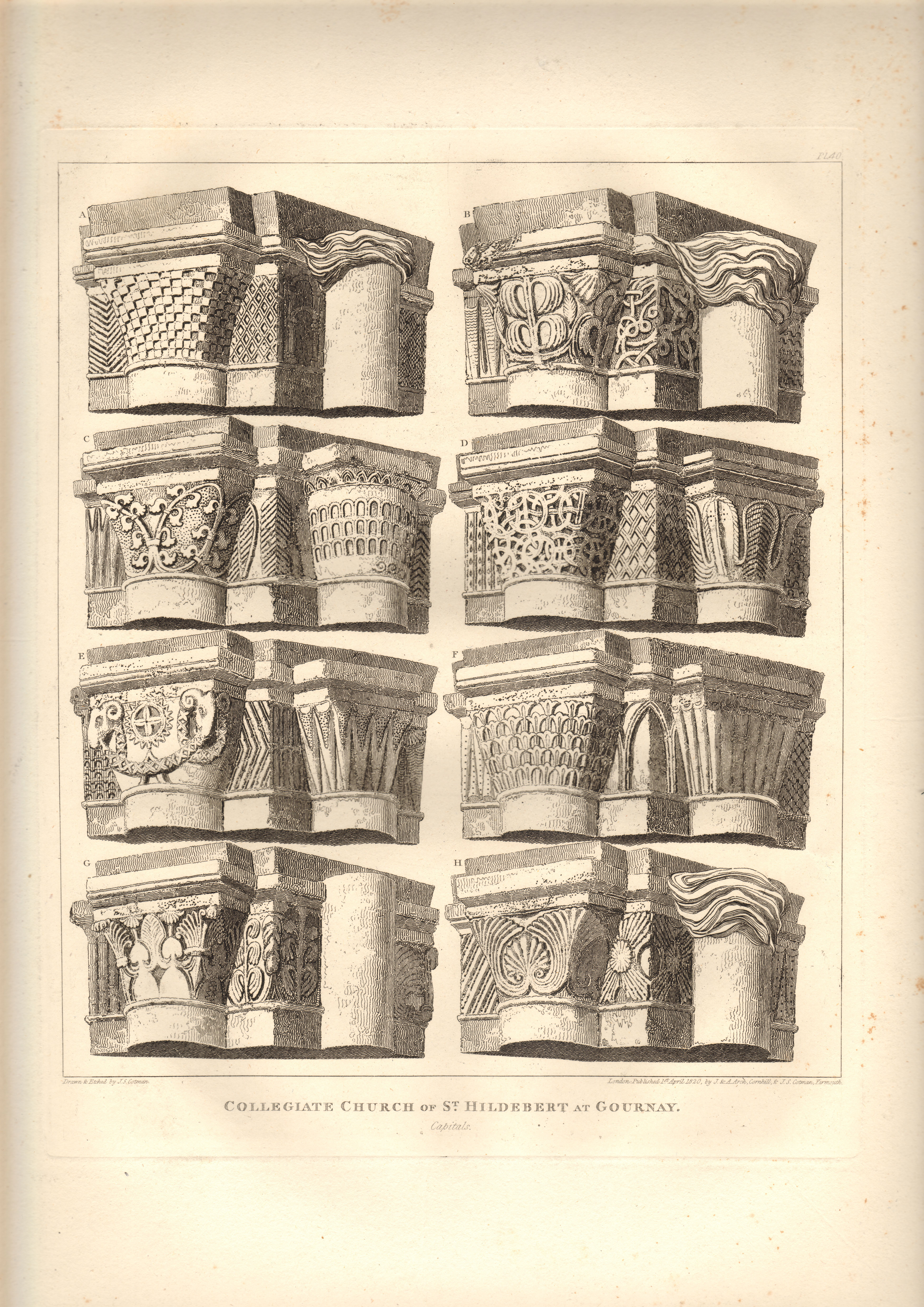
An 1820 engraving of some of the capitals in the church of St Hildevert

- The Collegiate Church of Saint-Hildevert, built in the 12th century, is famous for its Romanesque capitals, ornate decoration and its ancient religious sculptures.
- Vestiges of a 17th-century priory, now a farm
- Ruins of a 12th-century Capuchin monastery
- The chapel at the hamlet of Saint-Clair, built in 1829
- A memorial fountain of the 18th century
- The town gates and fortifications, dating from the 13th century
- Traces of 10th-century fortifications
- The 16th-century church of Saint-Jean-Baptiste

== International relations ==
- Hailsham, England

Gournay-en-Bray is twinned with Hailsham in the English County of East Sussex. Hailsham has a much larger population (circa 20,500 compared to Gournay-en-Bray's circa 6,500) but, according to Hailsham Town Council, "the features and facilities of both towns are quite similar". A twinning charter was signed in Hailsham in October 2000 and in Gournay-en-Bray in February 2001, and renewed in both towns on its 10th anniversary.

== Notable people ==
- Henri-Michel Guedier de Saint-Aubin (1695-1742), theologian and Sorbonne professor

== See also ==
- Communes of the Seine-Maritime department
