= Petite-Forêt =

- Commune
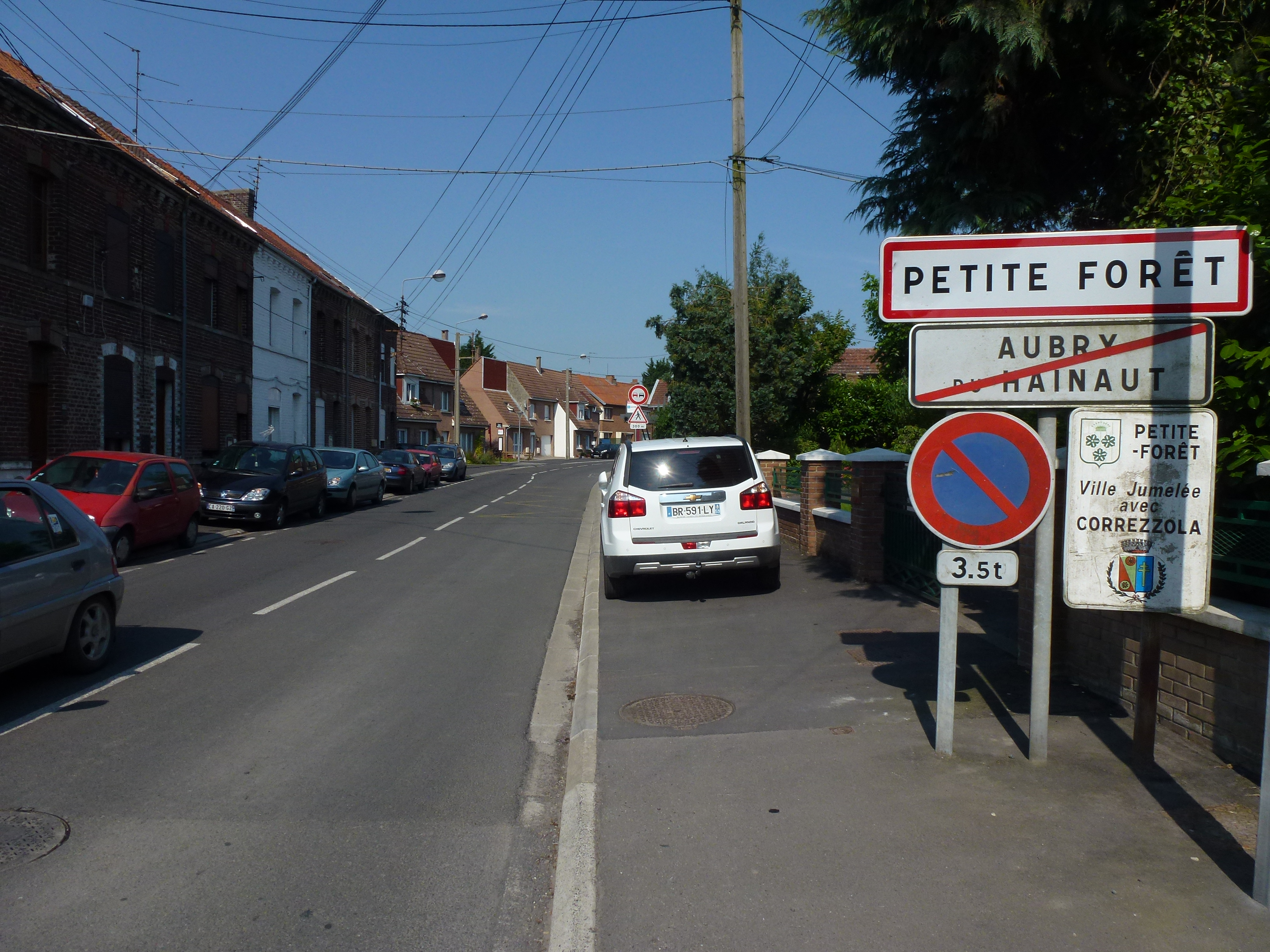
- The road into Petite-Forêt
- Location of Petite-Forêt
- Location within France Location within Hauts-de-France
- Coordinates: 50°22′19″N 3°28′32″E
- Country: France
- Region: Hauts-de-France
- Department: Nord
- Arrondissement: Valenciennes
- Canton: Aulnoy-lez-Valenciennes
- Intercommunality: CA Valenciennes Métropole

Government
  - Mayor (2020–2026): Sandrine Gombert
- Area^{1}: 4.55 km^{2} (1.76 sq mi)
- Elevation: 28 m (92 ft)
- Highest elevation: 55 m (180 ft)
- Lowest elevation: 26 m (85 ft)
- Population (2023): 5,054
  - Density: 1,110/km^{2} (2,880/sq mi)
- Time zone: UTC+01:00 (CET)
  - Summer (DST): UTC+02:00 (CEST)
- INSEE/Postal code: 59459 /59494
- ^{1} French Land Register data, which excludes lakes, ponds, glaciers > 1 km^{2} (0.386 sq mi or 247 acres) and river estuaries.

Petite-Forêt (French pronunciation: [pətit fɔʁɛ], literally Little Forest) is a commune in the Nord department in northern France.

== Population ==
Historical population
Year	Pop.	±% p.a.
1968	2,946	—
1975	3,422	+2.16%
1982	3,757	+1.34%
1990	5,293	+4.38%
1999	5,251	−0.09%
2007	4,928	−0.79%
2012	4,892	−0.15%
2017	4,877	−0.06%
2023	5,054	+0.60%
Source: INSEE

== See also ==
- Communes of the Nord department
