= Canton of Aulnoy-lez-Valenciennes =

Coordinates: 50.33°N 3.53°E

The canton of Aulnoy-lez-Valenciennes is an administrative division of the Nord department, northern France. It was created at the French canton reorganisation which came into effect in March 2015. Its seat is in Aulnoy-lez-Valenciennes.

It consists of the following communes:

1. Artres
2. Aubry-du-Hainaut
3. Aulnoy-lez-Valenciennes
4. Bellaing
5. Famars
6. Haspres
7. Haulchin
8. Haveluy
9. Hérin
10. Maing
11. Monchaux-sur-Écaillon
12. Oisy
13. Petite-Forêt
14. Prouvy
15. Quérénaing
16. Rouvignies
17. La Sentinelle
18. Thiant
19. Trith-Saint-Léger
20. Verchain-Maugré
