= Henri-Michel Guedier de Saint-Aubin =

French theologian

- Born: 17 June 1695; Gournay-en-Bray
- Died: 27 September 1742 (aged 47); Paris
- Alma mater: Sorbonne University
- Occupation: Librarian, theologian
- Employer: Sorbonne University

Henri-Michel Guedier de Saint-Aubin (17 June 1695 - 27 September 1742) was a French theologian.

He was born in Gournay-en-Bray on 17 June 1695. He studied at Paris, and received the doctor's degree from the Sorbonne Oct. 29,1723. He became professor in that institution in 1730, and its librarian in 1736. Some time after he obtained the abbey of St. Vulmer. He was acquainted with Hebrew, Greek, Latin, French, English, and Italian, besides history, theology, and kindred sciences. For fourteen years he decided all cases of conscience presented to the Sorbonne. He died in Paris on 27 September 1742.

He wrote, Histoire salute des deux Alliances (Paris, Didot, 1741, 7 vols. 12mo), which Moreri considers as a good concordance of the Old and New Testament. At the end of every part are remarks and arguments on the designs of the sacred writers, and on the authenticity and inspiration of their writings. — Ladvocat, Dict. historique; Moreri, Dict. hist. (edit. 1759); Hoefer, Nouv. Biog. Genesis 22:358.

This article incorporates public domain material from McClintock, John; Strong, James (1867–1887). Cyclopædia of Biblical, Theological and Ecclesiastical Literature. Harper and Brothers.
