= Loison-sous-Lens =

- Commune
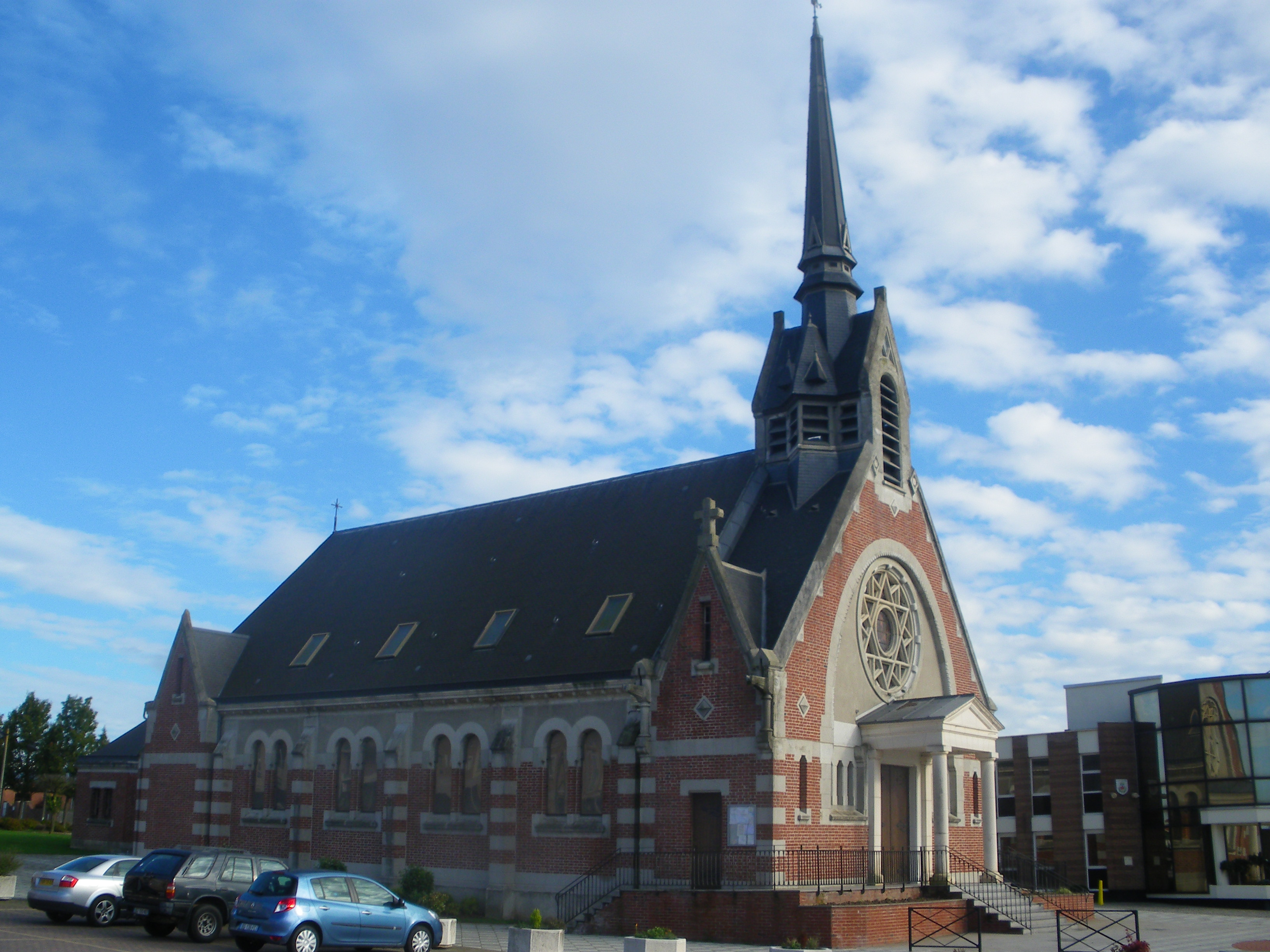
- The church of Loison-sous-Lens

- Coat of arms
- Location of Loison-sous-Lens
- Location within France Location within Hauts-de-France
- Coordinates: 50°26′20″N 2°51′12″E
- Country: France
- Region: Hauts-de-France
- Department: Pas-de-Calais
- Arrondissement: Lens
- Canton: Lens
- Intercommunality: CA Lens-Liévin

Government
  - Mayor (2020–2026): Daniel Kruszka
- Area^{1}: 3.55 km^{2} (1.37 sq mi)
- Elevation: 24 m (79 ft)
- Highest elevation: 48 m (157 ft)
- Lowest elevation: 24 m (79 ft)
- Population (2023): 5,169
  - Density: 1,460/km^{2} (3,770/sq mi)
- Time zone: UTC+01:00 (CET)
  - Summer (DST): UTC+02:00 (CEST)
- INSEE/Postal code: 62523 /62218
- ^{1} French Land Register data, which excludes lakes, ponds, glaciers > 1 km^{2} (0.386 sq mi or 247 acres) and river estuaries.

Loison-sous-Lens (French pronunciation: [lwazɔ̃ su lɑ̃s], literally Loison under Lens) is a commune in the Pas-de-Calais department in the Hauts-de-France region of France.

== Geography ==
Loison-sous-Lens is a suburban town, one mile east of the centre of Lens, at the junction of the D917 and the D162 roads. Bounded to the west by the A21 autoroute and to the south by the Lens Canal.

== Population ==
Historical population
Year	Pop.	±% p.a.
1968	5,223	—
1975	4,802	−1.19%
1982	5,022	+0.64%
1990	5,688	+1.57%
1999	5,579	−0.21%
2007	5,507	−0.16%
2012	5,175	−1.24%
2017	5,410	+0.89%
2023	5,169	−0.76%
Source: INSEE

== Places of interest ==
- The church of St.Vaast, dating from the twentieth century.
- A war memorial.

== See also ==
- Communes of the Pas-de-Calais department
