= A21 autoroute =

Road in France

A21 autoroute
- Rocade Minière

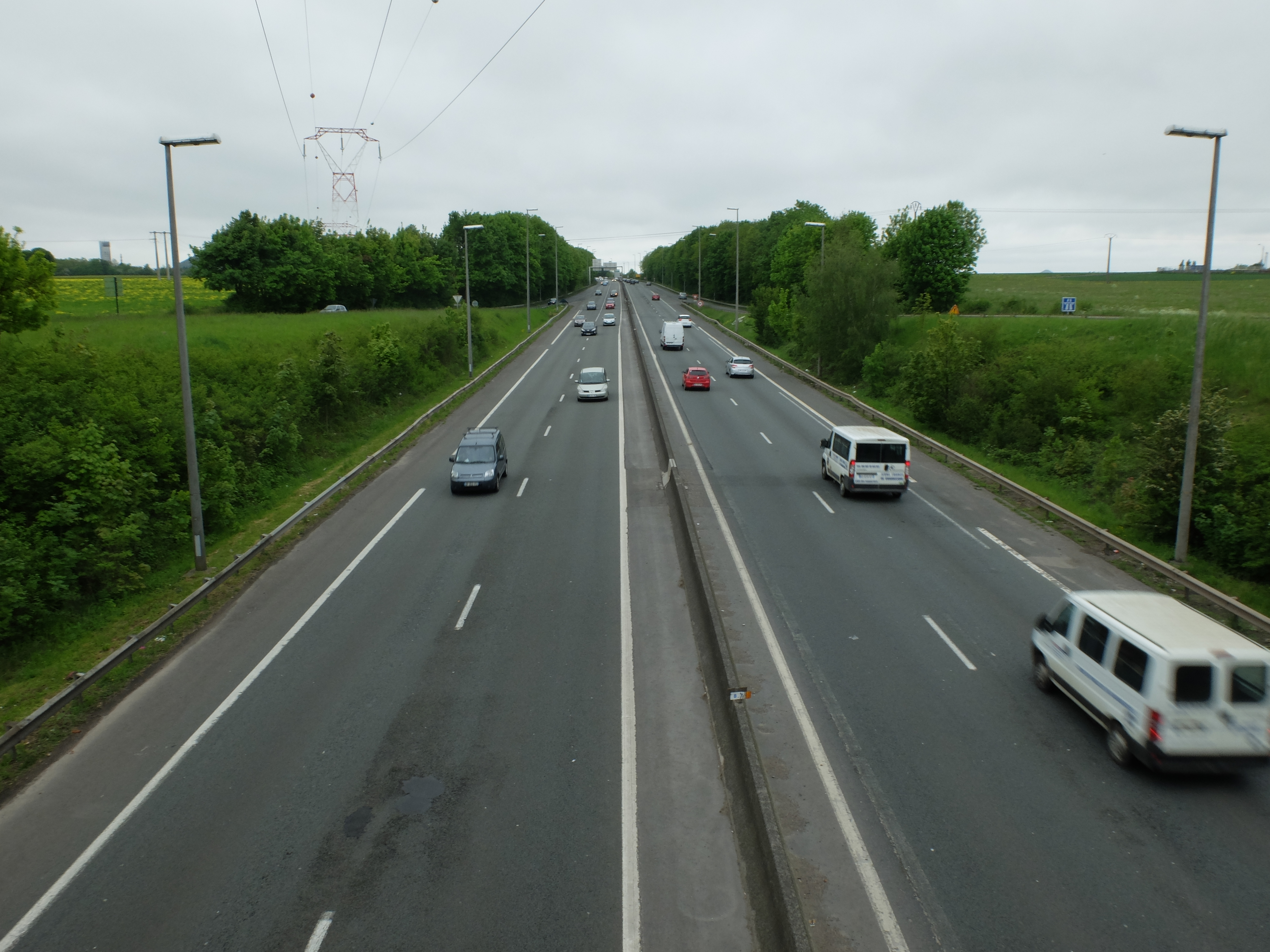
- The A21 near Lens

Route information
- Maintained by DIR Nord
- Length: 57.6 km (35.8 mi)
- Existed: 1978–present

Major junctions
- West end: D 301 / E15 / A 26 in Bully-les-Mines

- A 211 in Lens; E17 / A 1 in Dourges

- East end: E19 / A 2 in Douchy-les-Mines

Location
- Country: France

Highway system
- Roads in France; Autoroutes; Routes nationales

The A21 autoroute is a toll free highway in north western France. It is also known as the Rocade Minière. It is 57.6 kilometres (35.8 mi) long.

== List of exits and junctions ==
Region	Department	Junction	Destinations	Notes
Hauts-de-France	Pas-de-Calais	A26 & RD 301 - A21	Paris, Calais, Reims, Béthune, Nœux-les-Mines, Arras	
Hauts-de-France	Pas-de-Calais	A26 & RD 301 - A21	Barlin, Bruay-la-Buissière, Aix-Noulette, Hersin-Coupigny, Sains-en-Gohelle, Nœux-les-Mines, Béthune, Arras	
Hauts-de-France	Pas-de-Calais	7 : Lièvin	Bully-les-Mines, Liévin, Grenay	
Hauts-de-France	Pas-de-Calais	8 : Loos	Lens - ouest, Loos-en-Gohelle, Mazingarbe, Louvre-Lens, Stade Bollaert-Delelis, Béthune	
Hauts-de-France	Pas-de-Calais	9 : Lens - nord	Lens, Bénifontaine, Hulluch, Centre Hospitalier, Crématorium	
Hauts-de-France	Pas-de-Calais	10 : Z. I. Artois-Flandres	Lille (A25), La Bassée, Wingles	
Hauts-de-France	Pas-de-Calais	11 : Lens - est	Lens - Grande Résidence, Vendin-le-Vieil	
Hauts-de-France	Pas-de-Calais	12 : Lens - Grand Condé	Lens, Annay, Carvin, Harnes, Loison-sous-Lens	
Hauts-de-France	Pas-de-Calais	13 : Lens - centre	Lens, Stade Bollaert-Delelis	
Hauts-de-France	Pas-de-Calais	A211 - A21	Lièvin, Arras, Avion, Stade Couvert Régional	
Hauts-de-France	Pas-de-Calais	14 : Noyelles-sous-Lens	Sallaumines, Noyelles-sous-Lens	
Hauts-de-France	Pas-de-Calais	15 : Montigny-en-Gohelle	Fouquières-lès-Lens, Montigny-en-Gohelle	
Hauts-de-France	Pas-de-Calais	16 : Hénin-Beaumont	Hénin-Beaumont - centre	
Hauts-de-France	Pas-de-Calais	A1 - A21	Paris, Lille, Arras, Carvin, Libercourt, Hénin-Beaumont - Z. I.	
Hauts-de-France	Pas-de-Calais	17 : Noyelles-Godault	Noyelles-Godault, Dourges	
Hauts-de-France	Pas-de-Calais	18 : Courcelles-lès-Lens	Courcelles-lès-Lens, Évin-Malmaison, Leforest	
Hauts-de-France	Nord	19 : Le Villiers	Douai - centre, Cambrai	
Hauts-de-France	Nord	20 : Flers-en-Escrebieux	Flers-en-Escrebieux, Auby, Zone Industrielle Les Prés Loribes	
Hauts-de-France	Nord	21 : Pont de la Deûle	Douai - Dorignies	
Hauts-de-France	Nord	22 : L'Escarpelle	Roost-Warendin, Dorignies	
Hauts-de-France	Nord	23 : Waziers	Tournai, Douai - nord, Orchies, Waziers, Saint-Amand-les-Eaux, Gayant Expo	
Hauts-de-France	Nord	24 : Sin-le-Noble	Sin-le-Noble, Cambrai, Centre Hospitalier	
Hauts-de-France	Nord	25 : Lallaing	Lallaing, Montigny-en-Ostrevent	
Hauts-de-France	Nord	26 : Pecquencourt	Pecquencourt, Vred	
Hauts-de-France	Nord	27 : Rieulay	Somain, Orchies, Marchiennes, Rieulay, Z. I. de Sessevalle	
Hauts-de-France	Nord	28 : Somain	Somain, Aniche, Bouchain, Z.A. La Renaissance	
Hauts-de-France	Nord	29 : Abscon	Abscon	
Hauts-de-France	Nord	30 : Escaudain	Escaudain, Lourches	
Hauts-de-France	Nord	31 : Denain	Denain, Pierres Blanches	
Hauts-de-France	Nord	32 : Lourches	Denain, Lourches	Entry and exit from A2
Hauts-de-France	Nord	33 : Douchy-les-Mines	Douchy-les-Mines	Entry and exit from A2
Hauts-de-France	Nord	A2 - A21	Paris, Valenciennes, Cambrai, Liège, Bruxelles	
1.000 mi = 1.609 km; 1.000 km = 0.621 mi
