= La Sentinelle =

- Commune
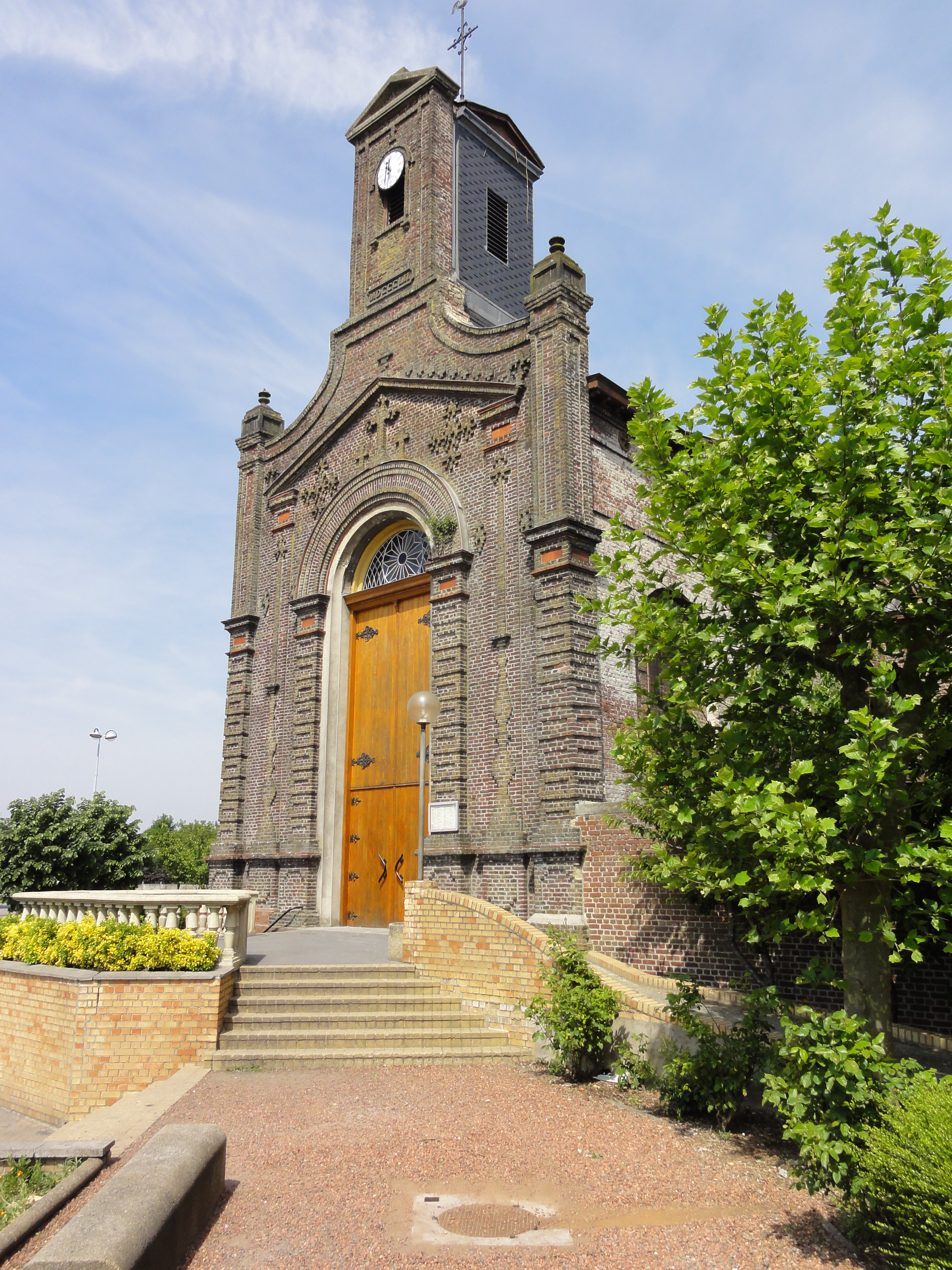
- The church in La Sentinelle
- Location of La Sentinelle
- Location within France Location within Hauts-de-France
- Coordinates: 50°21′N 3°29′E
- Country: France
- Region: Hauts-de-France
- Department: Nord
- Arrondissement: Valenciennes
- Canton: Aulnoy-lez-Valenciennes
- Intercommunality: CA Porte du Hainaut

Government
  - Mayor (2020–2026): Eric Blondiaux
- Area^{1}: 3.89 km^{2} (1.50 sq mi)
- Elevation: 53 m (174 ft)
- Highest elevation: 66 m (217 ft)
- Lowest elevation: 21 m (69 ft)
- Population (2023): 3,103
  - Density: 798/km^{2} (2,070/sq mi)
- Time zone: UTC+01:00 (CET)
  - Summer (DST): UTC+02:00 (CEST)
- INSEE/Postal code: 59564 /59174
- ^{1} French Land Register data, which excludes lakes, ponds, glaciers > 1 km^{2} (0.386 sq mi or 247 acres) and river estuaries.

La Sentinelle (French pronunciation: [la sɑ̃tinɛl]) is a commune in the Nord department in northern France.

== Population ==
Historical population
Year	Pop.	±% p.a.
1968	3,288	—
1975	3,680	+1.62%
1982	3,729	+0.19%
1990	3,588	−0.48%
1999	3,360	−0.73%
2007	3,267	−0.35%
2012	3,299	+0.20%
2017	3,136	−1.01%
2023	3,103	−0.18%
Source: INSEE

== See also ==
- Communes of the Nord department
