= Haulchin =

- Commune
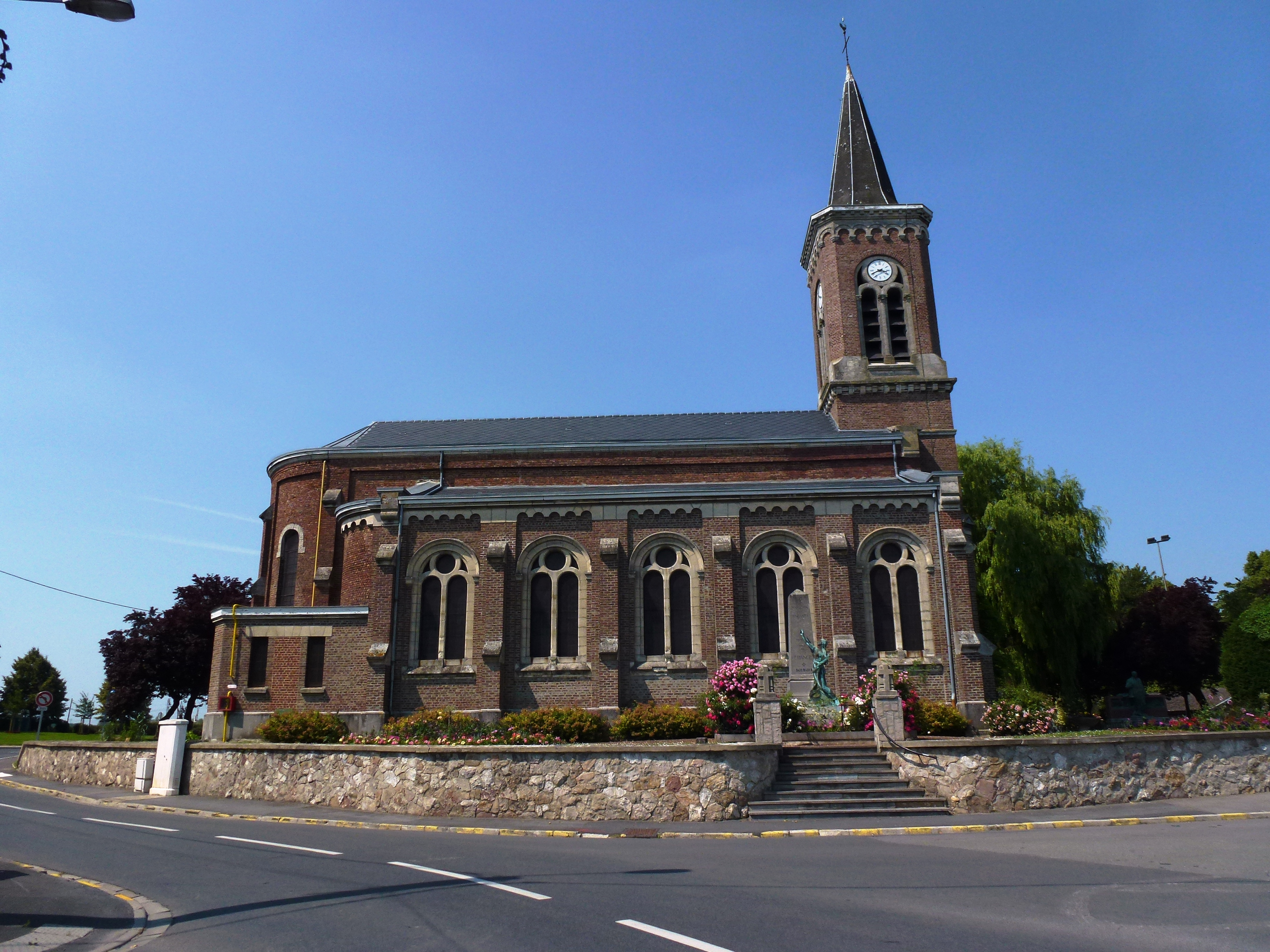
- The church in Haulchin

- Coat of arms
- Location of Haulchin
- Location within France Location within Hauts-de-France
- Coordinates: 50°19′05″N 3°26′13″E
- Country: France
- Region: Hauts-de-France
- Department: Nord
- Arrondissement: Valenciennes
- Canton: Aulnoy-lez-Valenciennes
- Intercommunality: CA Porte du Hainaut

Government
  - Mayor (2020–2026): Bruno Raczkiewicz
- Area^{1}: 5.15 km^{2} (1.99 sq mi)
- Elevation: 42 m (138 ft)
- Highest elevation: 72 m (236 ft)
- Lowest elevation: 27 m (89 ft)
- Population (2023): 2,281
  - Density: 443/km^{2} (1,150/sq mi)
- Time zone: UTC+01:00 (CET)
  - Summer (DST): UTC+02:00 (CEST)
- INSEE/Postal code: 59288 /59121
- ^{1} French Land Register data, which excludes lakes, ponds, glaciers > 1 km^{2} (0.386 sq mi or 247 acres) and river estuaries.

Haulchin (French pronunciation: [olʃɛ̃]) is a commune in the Nord department in northern France.

== Population ==
Historical population
Year	Pop.	±% p.a.
1968	2,732	—
1975	2,945	+1.08%
1982	2,746	−0.99%
1990	2,651	−0.44%
1999	2,566	−0.36%
2007	2,370	−0.99%
2012	2,329	−0.35%
2017	2,306	−0.20%
2023	2,281	−0.18%
Source: INSEE

== Heraldry ==
Arms of Haulchin	The arms of Haulchin are blazoned : Gules, a lion Or impaled with Azure semy de lys Or.

== See also ==
- Communes of the Nord department
