= Route nationale 28 =

Road in France

The Route nationale 28 is a trunk road in Normandy and Picardy in northwest France. It connects the city of Rouen to the port of Dunkerque. Most of the route has been superseded by the A28 autoroute.

== Route ==
The road begins in the city of Rouen as the Route de Neufchatel. It is now numbered the RD928 as through traffic now uses the A28. The road passes north of the town of Neufchatel-en-Bray and a junction with the A29 autoroute and N29. Thereafter the road is numbered the N29.

The road skirts to the west of the Basse Forêt d'Eu. It passes the town of Foucarmont and then through the Haute Foret d'Eu. It then reaches the town of Blangy-sur-Bresle. Thereafter the road is renumbered RD928. The road passes north east of the town of Abbeville.

The road heads north from Abbeville, again numbered the RD928, passing east of the Forêt de Crecy and the Battlefield of Crécy. The road crosses the River Authie followed by the town of Hesdin. It passes to the north across rolling countryside and into the valley of the River Aa. The road crosses the A26 autoroute and enters the town of Saint-Omer. The road continues north over flat countryside joining the RD916 south east of Bergues. The RD916 and N225 take traffic the remaining 9 km to Dunkerque.
