= A26 autoroute =

Road in France

A26 autoroute
- Autoroute des Anglais

Route information
- Part of E15 / E17
- Maintained by SANEF and APRR
- Length: 394 km (245 mi)
- Existed: 1976–present

Major junctions
- North end: E15 / E40 / A 16 E15 / A 216 in Calais

- A 21 in Bully-les-Mines; E15 / E17 / A 1 in Plouvain; E19 / A 2 in Anneux; E44 / A 29 in Francilly-Selency; E50 / A 4 in Thillois and Les Grandes-Loges

- South end: E17 / E54 / A 5 in Troyes

Location
- Country: France

Highway system
- Roads in France; Autoroutes; Routes nationales

The A26 is a 357.6 km (222.2 mi) long French motorway connecting Calais and Troyes. It is also known as the Autoroute des Anglais (Motorway of the English) as its length forms the first part of the main route from the Dover-Calais ferries and the Channel Tunnel towards Southern and Eastern France and the Cote d'Azur. The motorway is used by a high proportion of British cars, particularly during the summer holiday season. The A26 between Calais and Arras (in conjunction with the A1 autoroute) is part of one of the two main routes between London and Paris, the other being the A16.

The road forms part of European route E-15 and E-17. South of its junction with the A29 autoroute the A26 is part of the Grand contournement de Paris.

== History of the A26 ==
The A26 was conceived in the 1960s as an upgrade to the "Grand Itineraire" Calais-Vitry-le-François which followed mostly the N44 road.

The first part of the motorway opened in December 1976 with the 23 km section from junction 5 at Lillers to the A21 exit at Lievin. Subsequently, the 261 km Calais-Reims stretch was opened in stages, the final one completed in March 1989.

By the time the 96 km southern extension connecting the A4 autoroute and A5 autoroute opened in June 1992 it was the final link in the first continuous motorway route from Calais to Marseille and the Cote d'Azur that completely bypassed the Paris area with its associated congestion, reducing driving time from Calais to Lyon by approximately 90 minutes to around 6 hours. This section also made up the final part of an uninterrupted motorway route between the major cities of Lyon/Marseille and Lille without having to drive via either Paris or Belgium.

The road in its current form was completed in 2010 with the short extension southward from the old A4 autoroute which ran through the centre of Reims (now marked A344) to the new A4 southern bypass of the city (Contournement de Reims Sud) along with the construction of the new closed system peage station at Ormes.

== Route ==
The northern end of the motorway starts just to the southeast of Calais, at a junction with the A16 (5 km east of the Eurotunnel exit) and A216/N216 (which links to the Port of Calais and the car ferries). From there it runs southeast past Saint-Omer, Béthune, Lens and Arras. Near Arras is a major intersection with the A1, which runs south to Paris.

The A26 continues southeast, passing near Cambrai, Saint-Quentin and Laon before meeting the A4 at Reims. The two motorways merge (multiplex) for 36 km (22 mi), although for the merged section the route is marked A4, before splitting up again near Châlons-en-Champagne (formerly Châlons-sur-Marne).

The A4 then continues eastwards to Metz, Nancy and Strasbourg and the A26 branches to the south toward Troyes and Lyon. The current southern terminus of the A26 is just to the southeast of Troyes where the motorway meets the A5, which provides a direct motorway connection to Dijon, Lyon, southern and eastern France as well as Milan and The Alps.

The A26 is a toll (peage) motorway for its entire length. The vast majority is maintained by SANEF except the very southern end south of junction 22 which is operated by APRR. There are 3 majors (closed system) toll stations at Setques (St. Omer), Courcy (Reims Nord) and Ormes (Reims Ouest).

== Regions traversed ==
- Hauts-de-France
- Grand Est

== Departements traversed ==
- Pas-de-Calais (62)
- Nord (59)
- Aisne (02)
- Somme (80)
- Marne (51)
- Aube (10)

== Radio coverage ==
The A26 is completely covered by two zones of SANEF 107.7 traffic coverage: North of Reims, it is in the northern zone and South of Reims, it is within the eastern zone.

== Characteristics ==
The A26 is 2x2 lanes throughout and passes close to some of the most well known World War I battle sites as well as through the vineyards of the Champagne-Ardennes area (which is now part of the Grand-Est region). It is built on mainly relatively flat, agricultural land and has many long, fairly straight sections and few steep gradients as a result. It crosses over, as well as through the valleys of the rivers Aa, Lys, Somme and Marne as well as le Méridienne verte, a millennium project to plant a line of trees the length of France along the Paris Meridian.

The northern section of the motorway can be prone to strong crosswinds and heavy downpours and there are large wind turbines and windsocks visible throughout the whole length of the road. The motorway is characterised by European signage in brown pointing out sites of historical and cultural interest along its route. It is usually not one of the more congested routes on the French autoroute network. Like many autoroutes of France the A26 is completely unlit, relying on heavily fluorescent road markings to guide drivers at night.

The road is well surfaced and maintained in comparison to most other countries' motorways. Signage is typical of the French system where destination is given strong prominence over road designation and signs are completely capitalised. After each junction there are two marker boards at the side of the road: Firstly, a white sign with information about the next exit with distance to it and the destinations it serves and secondly, a blue sign with distances to the motorway's main and onward destinations. Overhead gantries display destinations before the larger junctions and digital overhead gantries provide live information on anything from traffic, accidents and breakdowns to the weather. As with other autoroutes in France, along the central reservation every one hundred metres is a small sign showing the distance from the start of the motorway, starting with 0.1 km at Calais and ending with 394.0 km at Troyes. Along the 36 km stretch merged with the A4 these signs are not present as the distance markers for the A4 itself are given priority. They resume once the motorways split with the 36 km difference in distance taken into account.

In order to continue along the A26 northbound or southbound after the 36 km stretch merged with the A4 autoroute, drivers must take the exit slips from the A4 at Reims (northbound) or Châlons-en-Champagne (southbound).

Since the mid-2000s the final aire on the northbound side (Nortkerque) has been permanently closed due to its use by migrants as a boarding point onto parked freight vehicles heading for the UK. Since 2018 the Aire de Villefleur, the penultimate northbound aire has also been closed for the same reason. There are semi-permanent red and white plastic barriers in place to prevent entry to the aires. There is signage to warn northbound motorists that St. Hilaire-Cottes is the final chance to stop before the end of the motorway.

== Opening dates ==
- 3 December 1976 : Section Lillers - Liévin ( 5 - A21)
- 23 September 1977 : Section Liévin - Plouvain (A21 - A1)
- 20 December 1981 : Section Setques - Lillers ( 3 to 5 )
- 10 November 1982 : Section Plouvain - La Vacquerie (A1 - 9 )
- 11 August 1983 : Section Nordausques - Setques ( 2 to 3 )
- 27 July 1985 : Section La Vacquerie - Saint-Quentin-Nord ( 9 to 10 )
- 29 November 1985 : Section Saint-Quentin-Nord - Grugies ( 10 to 11 )
- 7 July 1987 : Section Grugies - Laon ( 11 to 13 )
- 16 December 1988 : Section Calais - Nordausques (A16 - 2 )
- 24 March 1989 : Section Laon - Thillois ( 13 - A344)
- 30 June 1992 : Section Les Grandes-Loges - Montaulin (A4-East - A5)
- 23 November 2010 : Section Thillois - Ormes (A344 - A4-West)

== List of exits and junctions ==
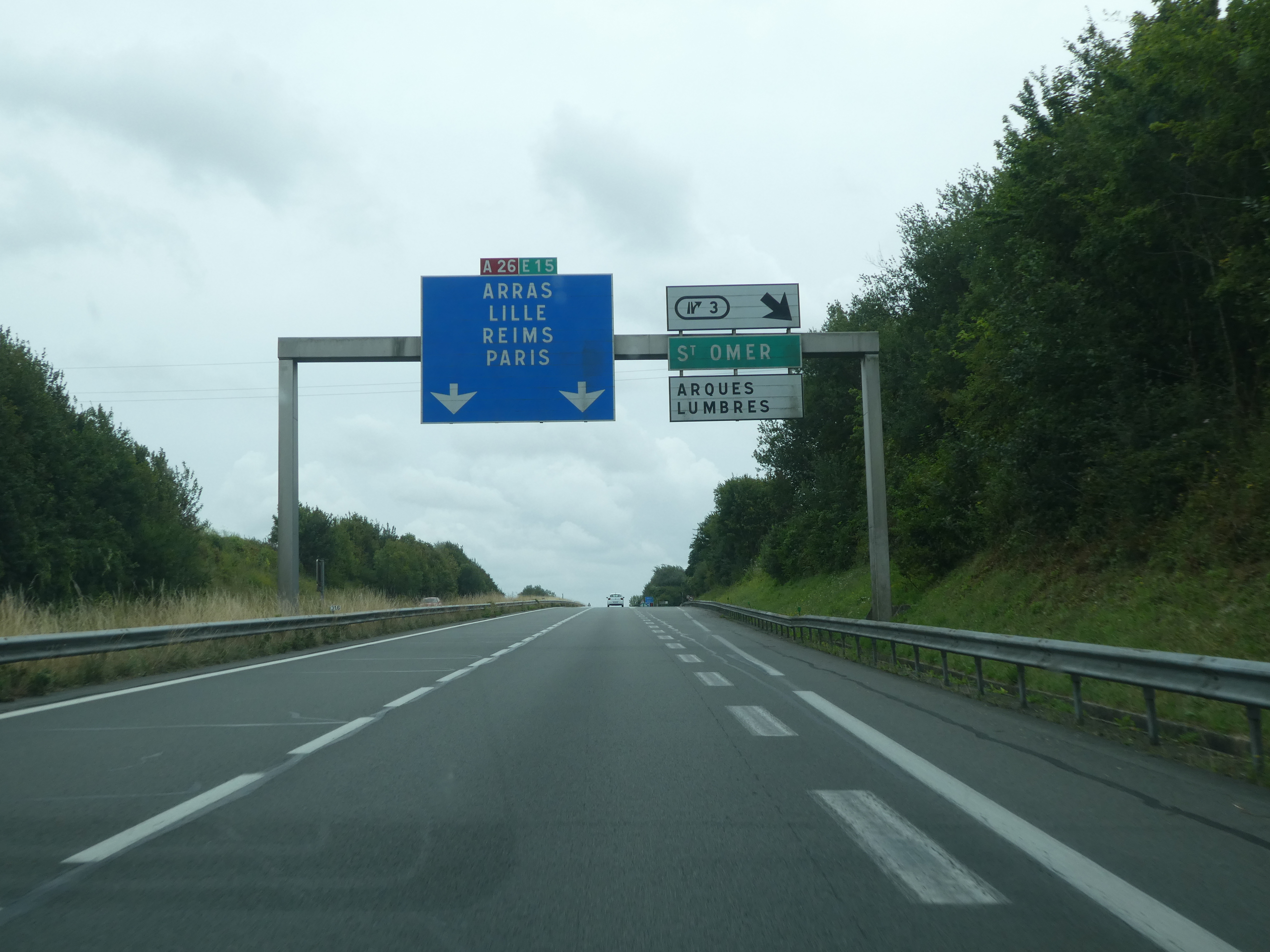
Exit 3 - Saint-Omer, direction north–south

Region	Department	Junction	Destinations	Notes
Hauts-de-France	Pas-de-Calais	A16 - A26 + 1 : Calais - Port (A216)	Boulogne-sur-Mer, Tunnel sous la Manche, Calais - ouest, Calais - centre, Dunkerque, Marck	
Hauts-de-France	Pas-de-Calais	A16 - A26 + 1 : Calais - Port (A216)	Calais - est	
Hauts-de-France	Pas-de-Calais	Aire de Nortkerque (Northbound, permanently closed); Aire de Zutkerque (Southbound)		
Hauts-de-France	Pas-de-Calais	2 : Vallée de la Hem	Nordausques, Licques, Éperlecques, Tournehem, Audruicq, Ardres, Guînes	
Hauts-de-France	Pas-de-Calais	3 : Saint-Omer	Saint-Omer, Arques, Lumbres, Boulogne-sur-Mer, Dunkerque	
Hauts-de-France	Pas-de-Calais	Péage de Setques		
Hauts-de-France	Pas-de-Calais	4 : Aire-sur-la-Lys	Saint-Omer, Arques, Aire-sur-la-Lys, Desvres, Le Touquet, Berck	
Hauts-de-France	Pas-de-Calais	Aire de Grand Riez (Southbound); Aire de Villefleur (Northbound, permanently closed)		
Hauts-de-France	Pas-de-Calais	Aire de Rely (Southbound); Aire de St-Hilaire-Cottes (Northbound)		
Hauts-de-France	Pas-de-Calais	5 : Lillers	Lillers, Auchel, Saint-Pol-sur-Ternoise, Hazebrouck, Aire-sur-la-Lys	
Hauts-de-France	Pas-de-Calais	Aire du Réveillon (Southbound); Aire de La Grande Bucaille (Northbound, permanently closed)		
Hauts-de-France	Pas-de-Calais	6 : Béthune	Béthune, Bruay-la-Buissière	
Hauts-de-France	Pas-de-Calais	6.1 : Noeux-les-Mines	Nœux-les-Mines, Labourse, Loisinord	
Hauts-de-France	Pas-de-Calais	6.2 : Lièvin + A21 - A26	Bruay-la-Buissière, Nœux-les-Mines, Sains-en-Gohelle, Aix-Noulette	
Hauts-de-France	Pas-de-Calais	6.2 : Lièvin + A21 - A26	Lens, Liévin, Douai, Lille, Bully-les-Mines	
Hauts-de-France	Pas-de-Calais	Aire de Souchez (Southbound); Aire d'Angres (Northbound)		
Hauts-de-France	Pas-de-Calais	7 : Arras	Arras - centre, Vimy, Lens	
Hauts-de-France	Pas-de-Calais	Aire des Trois Crêtes (Southbound, permanently closed); Aire de La Cressonière (Northbound)		
Hauts-de-France	Pas-de-Calais	A1 - A26	Arras - est, Lille, Paris, Douai	
Hauts-de-France	Pas-de-Calais	E15 / A 26 becomes E17 / A 26		
Hauts-de-France	Pas-de-Calais	Aire des Bonnettes (southbound); Aire de Bois-Dhuez (Northbound)		
Hauts-de-France	Pas-de-Calais	Aire de Rumaucourt (Northbound); Aire de Baralle (Southbound)		
Hauts-de-France	Pas-de-Calais	8 : Marquion	Marquion, Cambrai	
Hauts-de-France	Pas-de-Calais	A2 - A26	Paris (A1), Bruxelles, Valenciennes, Cambrai	
Hauts-de-France	Nord	Aire du Plateau (Northbound, permanently closed); Aire de la Vacquerie (Southbound)		
Hauts-de-France	Nord	9 : Masnières	Masnières, Cambrai - Faubourg de Paris, Péronne	
Hauts-de-France	Aisne	Aire de La Haute Bruyère (Northbound); Aire de l'Omignon (Southbound)		
Hauts-de-France	Aisne	10 : Saint-Quentin - nord	Saint-Quentin - centre	
Hauts-de-France	Aisne	A29 - A26	Rouen, Amiens, Péronne, Ham, Paris (A1)	
Hauts-de-France	Aisne	11 : Saint-Quentin - sud	Chauny-Tergnier, Soissons, Saint-Quentin - centre, Gauchy	
Hauts-de-France	Aisne	Aire d'Urvillers		
Hauts-de-France	Aisne	12 : La Fère	Courbes, La Fère, Crécy-sur-Serre, Chauny-Tergnier	
Hauts-de-France	Aisne	Aire de Saint-Brice (Southbound); Aire du Broyon (Northbound)		
Hauts-de-France	Aisne	13 : Laon	Laon, Maubeuge, Crécy-sur-Serre, Vervins, Sissonne	
Hauts-de-France	Aisne	Aire de La Croisette (Southbound); Aire des Pélerins (Northbound)		
Hauts-de-France	Aisne	Aire du Mont-de-Nizy (Southbound); Aire du Champ-Roland (Northbound)		
Hauts-de-France	Aisne	14 : La Vallée de l'Aisne	Guignicourt, Berry-au-Bac, Rethel	
Grand Est	Marne	Aire de Cauroy (Southbound); Aire de Loivre (Northbound)		
Grand Est	Marne	Péage de Courcy		
Grand Est	Marne	15 : Reims - La Neuvillette	Reims, Reims-Champagne Airport	
Grand Est	Marne	16 : Reims - Colbert	Bétheny, Reims - nord, Reims - ouest, Saint-Brice-Courcelles	
Grand Est	Marne	16.1 : Tinqueux ( A344 - A26)	Reims - centre, Tinqueux, Soissons	
Grand Est	Marne	Péage d'Ormes		
Grand Est	Marne	A4 Westbound - A26	Paris, Château-Thierry	
Grand Est	Marne	E17 / A 26 becomes E17 / E46 / A 26 / E50 / A 4		
Grand Est	Marne	A4 Eastbound - A26	Châlons-en-Champagne - centre, Verdun, Metz-Nancy, Strasbourg	
Grand Est	Marne	E17 / E46 / A 26 / E50 / A 4 becomes again E17 / A 26		
Grand Est	Marne	Aire des Grands Traquiers (Southbound)		
Grand Est	Marne	17 : Saint Gibrien	Épernay, Châlons-en-Champagne - Rive Gauche, Fagnières, Saint-Gibrien	
Grand Est	Marne	Aire de La Garenne (Northbound)		
Grand Est	Marne	18 : Mont Choisy	Châlons-en-Champagne - Compertrix, Châlons-en-Champagne - centre, Mont-Choisy, Fère-Champenoise	
Grand Est	Marne	Aire de La Bardolle (Northbound)		
Grand Est	Marne	19 : Vatry	Europort Business Park, Vatry	
Grand Est	Marne	20 : Sommesous	Sézanne, Vitry-le-François, Fère-Champenoise	
Grand Est	Marne	20 : Sommesous	Aire de Sommesous	
Grand Est	Aube	Aire de Champ du Carreau (Southbound); Aire de Champ-L'Épée (Northbound)		
Grand Est	Aube	21 : La Vallée de l'Aube	Arcis-sur-Aube, Brienne-le-Château, Romilly-sur-Seine	
Grand Est	Aube	22 : Charmont-sous-Barbuise	Troyes - centre, Pont-Sainte-Marie, Charmont-sous-Barbuise, Feuges	
Grand Est	Aube	22 : Charmont-sous-Barbuise	Aire de Charmont (automatic unmanned)	
Grand Est	Aube	Aire de Villechétif (Southbound); Aire des Crocs de la Terre (Northbound)		
Grand Est	Aube	23 : Thennelières	Troyes - est, Saint-Dizier, Pont-Sainte-Marie, Saint-Parres-aux-Tertres, Forêt d'Orient	
Grand Est	Aube	A5 - A26	Orléans, Paris, Auxerre, Sens	
Grand Est	Aube	A5 - A26	Mulhouse, Lyon, Dijon, Chaumont	
1.000 mi = 1.609 km; 1.000 km = 0.621 mi

== Future ==
For some years there have been plans to extend the A26 to Auxerre after 2025, and perhaps to Bourges thereafter, but that is not programmed before 2030. The extension would, if completed, replace N77 and N151 as part of the second version of the Grand contournement de Paris, upgrading the south-eastern section of the ring road to motorway standard.
