= Pont-Sainte-Marie =

Commune in Grand Est, France

- Commune
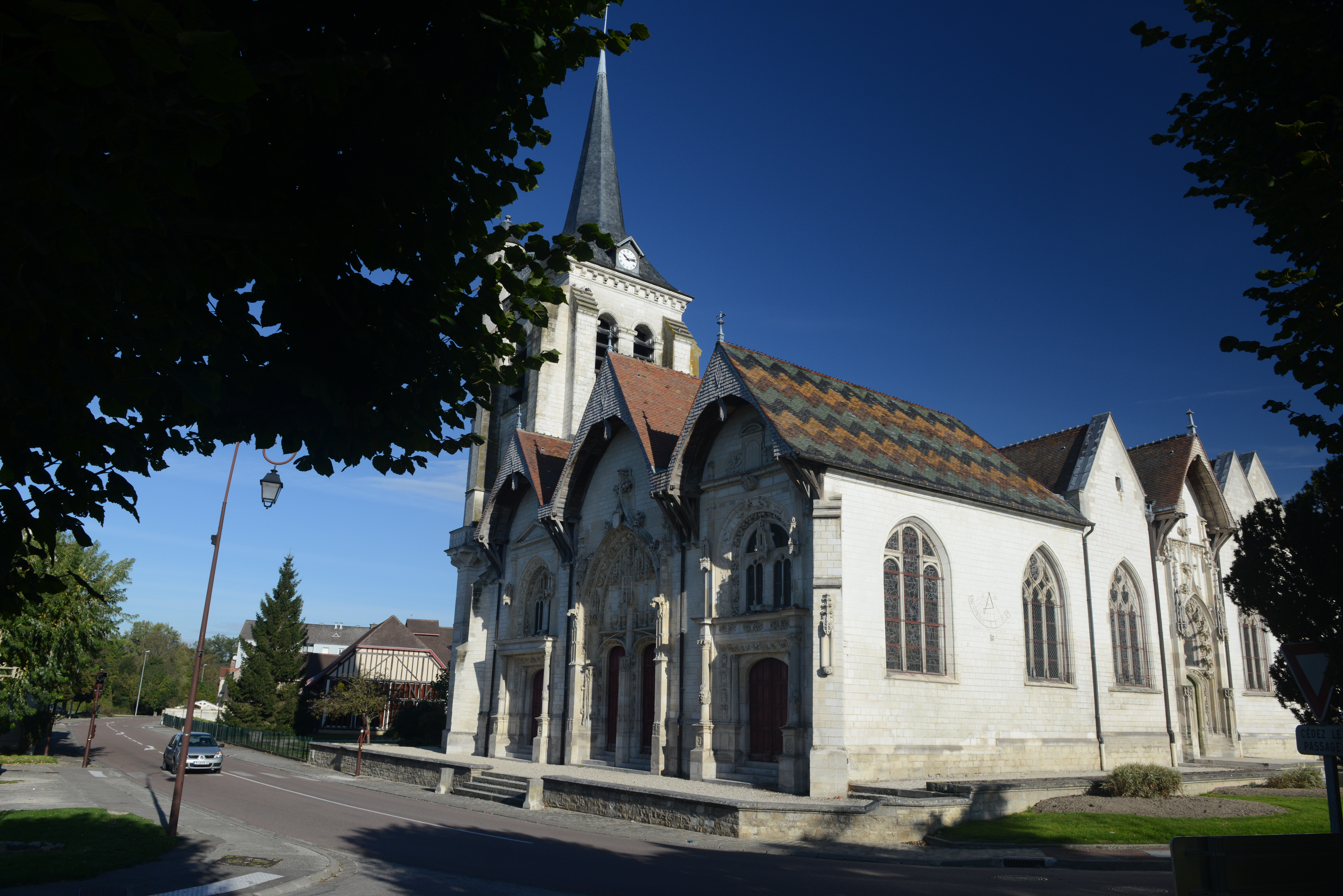
- The church in Pont-Sainte-Marie

- Coat of arms
- Location of Pont-Sainte-Marie
- Location within France Location within Grand Est
- Coordinates: 48°19′17″N 4°06′08″E
- Country: France
- Region: Grand Est
- Department: Aube
- Arrondissement: Troyes
- Canton: Troyes-4
- Intercommunality: CA Troyes Champagne Métropole

Government
  - Mayor (2020–2026): Pascal Landreat
- Area^{1}: 3.99 km^{2} (1.54 sq mi)
- Elevation: 105 m (344 ft)
- Highest elevation: 121 m (397 ft)
- Lowest elevation: 102 m (335 ft)
- Population (2023): 5,249
  - Density: 1,320/km^{2} (3,410/sq mi)
- Time zone: UTC+01:00 (CET)
  - Summer (DST): UTC+02:00 (CEST)
- INSEE/Postal code: 10297 /10150
- ^{1} French Land Register data, which excludes lakes, ponds, glaciers > 1 km^{2} (0.386 sq mi or 247 acres) and river estuaries.

Pont-Sainte-Marie (French pronunciation: [pɔ̃ sɛ̃t maʁi]) is a commune in the Aube department in north-central France.

== Population ==
Historical population
Year	Pop.	±% p.a.
1968	2,128	—
1975	3,073	+5.39%
1982	4,915	+6.94%
1990	4,856	−0.15%
1999	4,936	+0.18%
2007	4,795	−0.36%
2012	4,823	+0.12%
2017	5,166	+1.38%
2023	5,249	+0.27%
Source: INSEE

== See also ==
- Communes of the Aube department
- List of medieval bridges in France
