= Trith-Saint-Léger =

- Commune
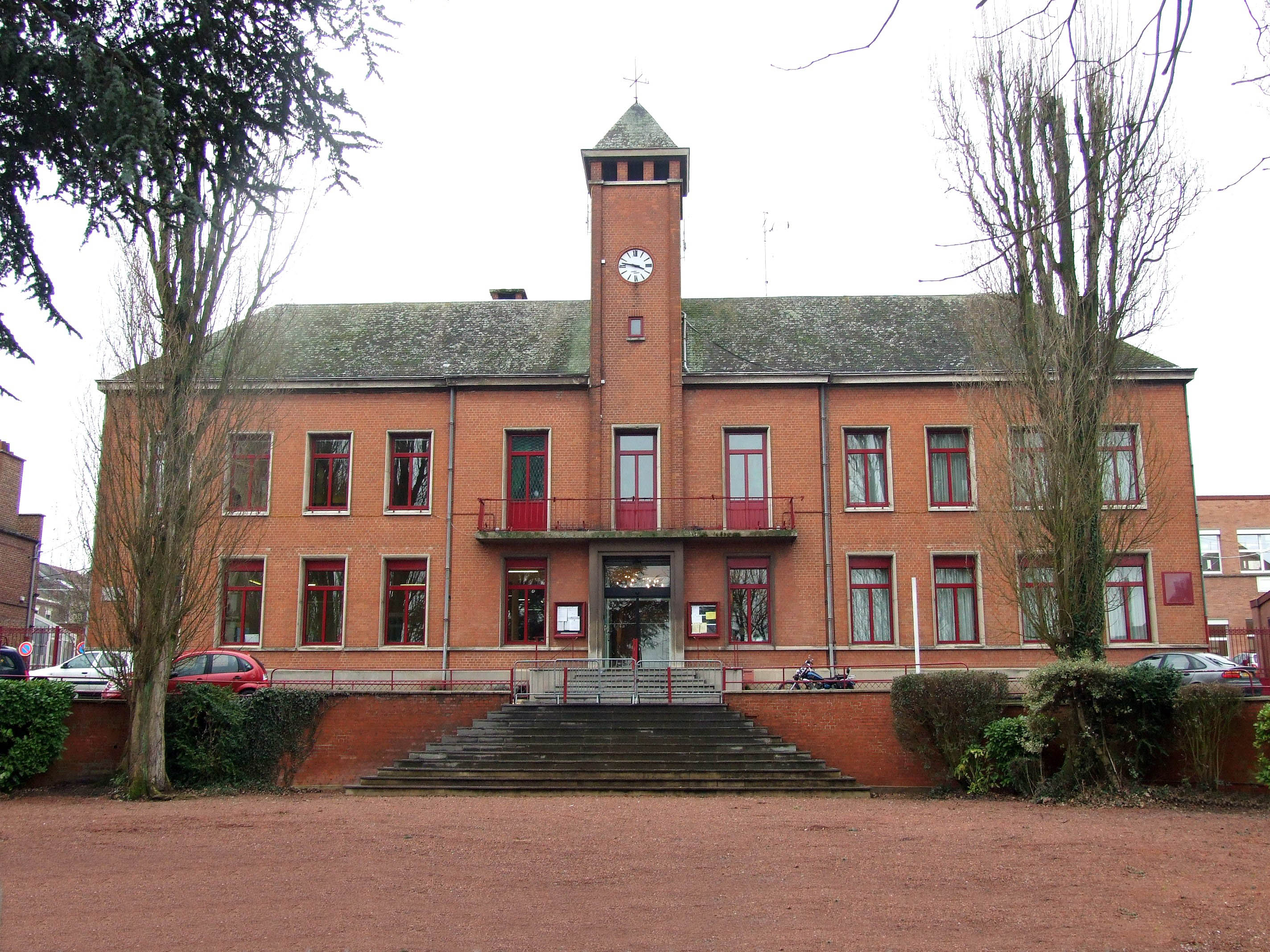
- The town hall in Trith-Saint-Léger

- Coat of arms
- Location of Trith-Saint-Léger
- Location within France Location within Hauts-de-France
- Coordinates: 50°19′30″N 3°29′10″E
- Country: France
- Region: Hauts-de-France
- Department: Nord
- Arrondissement: Valenciennes
- Canton: Aulnoy-lez-Valenciennes
- Intercommunality: CA Porte du Hainaut

Government
  - Mayor (2020–2026): Dominique Savary
- Area^{1}: 6.87 km^{2} (2.65 sq mi)
- Elevation: 25 m (82 ft)
- Highest elevation: 81 m (266 ft)
- Lowest elevation: 21 m (69 ft)
- Population (2023): 6,019
  - Density: 876/km^{2} (2,270/sq mi)
- Time zone: UTC+01:00 (CET)
  - Summer (DST): UTC+02:00 (CEST)
- INSEE/Postal code: 59603 /59125
- ^{1} French Land Register data, which excludes lakes, ponds, glaciers > 1 km^{2} (0.386 sq mi or 247 acres) and river estuaries.

Trith-Saint-Léger (French pronunciation: [tʁit sɛ̃ leʒe]) is a commune in the Nord department in northern France.

== Population ==
Historical population
Year	Pop.	±% p.a.
1968	7,612	—
1975	6,757	−1.69%
1982	5,952	−1.80%
1990	6,208	+0.53%
1999	6,196	−0.02%
2007	6,505	+0.61%
2012	6,393	−0.35%
2017	6,215	−0.56%
2023	6,019	−0.53%
Source: INSEE

== Heraldry ==
Arms of Trith-Saint-Léger	The arms of Trith-Saint-Léger are blazoned : Argent, a crescent gules.

== See also ==
- Communes of the Nord department
