= Douchy-les-Mines =

- Commune
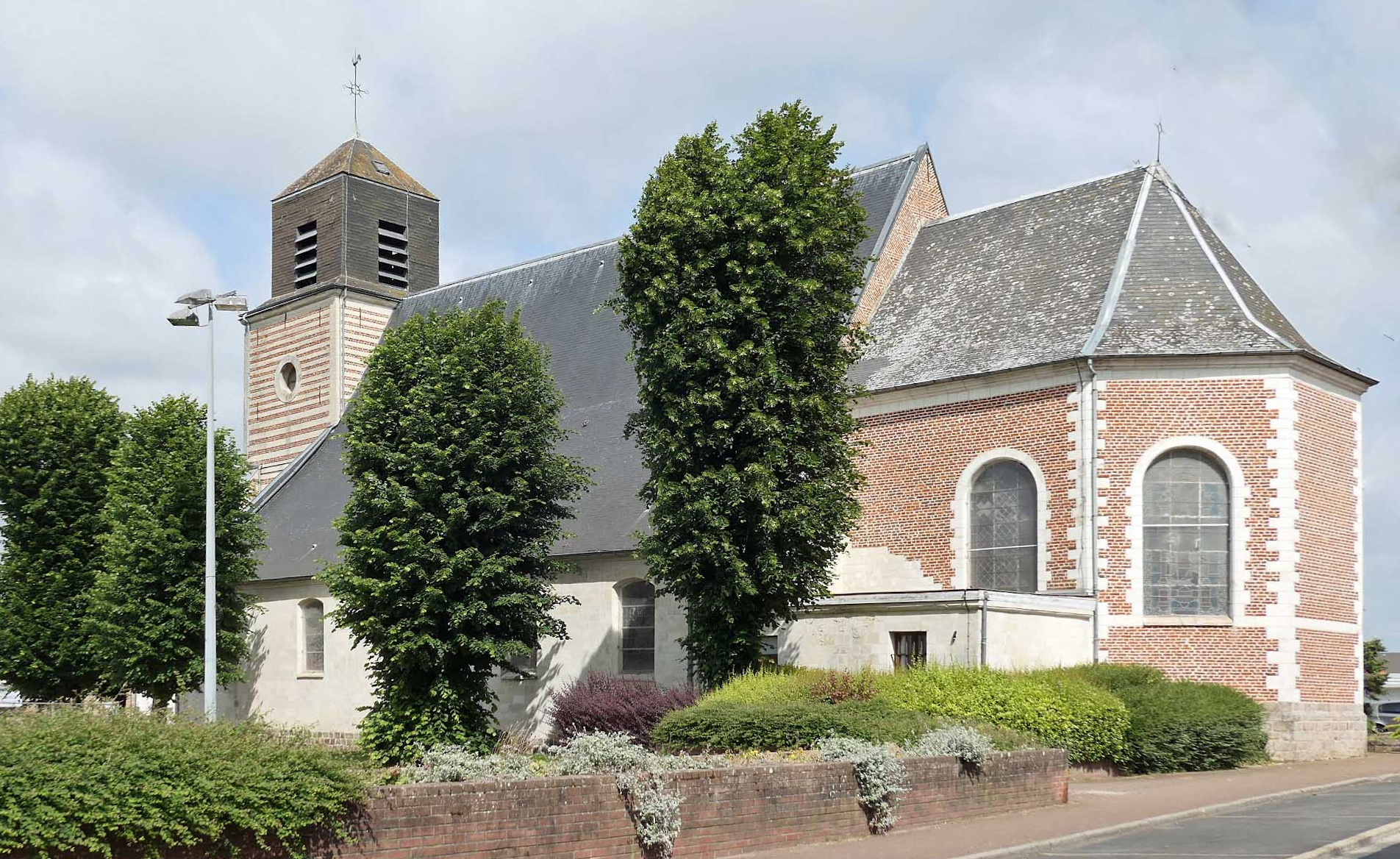
- St. Peter's Church

- Coat of arms
- Location of Douchy-les-Mines
- Location within France Location within Hauts-de-France
- Coordinates: 50°18′08″N 3°23′38″E
- Country: France
- Region: Hauts-de-France
- Department: Nord
- Arrondissement: Valenciennes
- Canton: Denain
- Intercommunality: CA Porte du Hainaut

Government
  - Mayor (2020–2026): Michel Véniat
- Area^{1}: 9.27 km^{2} (3.58 sq mi)
- Elevation: 58 m (190 ft)
- Highest elevation: 80 m (260 ft)
- Lowest elevation: 27 m (89 ft)
- Population (2023): 10,109
  - Density: 1,090/km^{2} (2,820/sq mi)
- Time zone: UTC+01:00 (CET)
  - Summer (DST): UTC+02:00 (CEST)
- INSEE/Postal code: 59179 /59282
- ^{1} French Land Register data, which excludes lakes, ponds, glaciers > 1 km^{2} (0.386 sq mi or 247 acres) and river estuaries.

Douchy-les-Mines (French pronunciation: [duʃi le min]) is a commune in the Nord department in northern France.

== Geography ==
Douchy-les-Mines located near the A2 motorway between Valenciennes and Cambrai. It lies adjacent to the south of Denain and is a part of the urban area of Valenciennes.

== Demography and culture ==
Historical population
Year	Pop.	±% p.a.
1968	7,421	—
1975	11,118	+5.95%
1982	11,140	+0.03%
1990	10,931	−0.24%
1999	10,413	−0.54%
2007	9,986	−0.52%
2012	10,737	+1.46%
2017	10,558	−0.34%
2023	10,109	−0.72%
Source: INSEE

The city has two cinemas (Cinéma Jean Renoir and Le Cinéma de l'Imaginaire) and it hosts the Regional Centre of Photography.

=== Landmarks ===
- Maingoval Park (Parc Maingoval)
- Le Château de la Barbière

=== Notable people ===
- Charles Alexandre Crauk, painter (1819–1905)
- Jean-Baptiste Dupilet, French politician (1880–1952)
- Robert Mintkewicz, bicycle racer (born 1947)

== Heraldry ==
Arms of Douchy-les-Mines	The arms of Douchy-les-Mines are blazoned : Barry argent and azure, 2 sea-bass addorsed Or. (the fish are called bar in French)

== International relations ==
Douchy-les-Mines is twinned with:

- Méguet, Burkina Faso
- Mielec, Poland
- Vila Nova de Poiares, Portugal

== See also ==
- Communes of the Nord department
