= Bréviandes =

Commune in Grand Est, France

- Commune
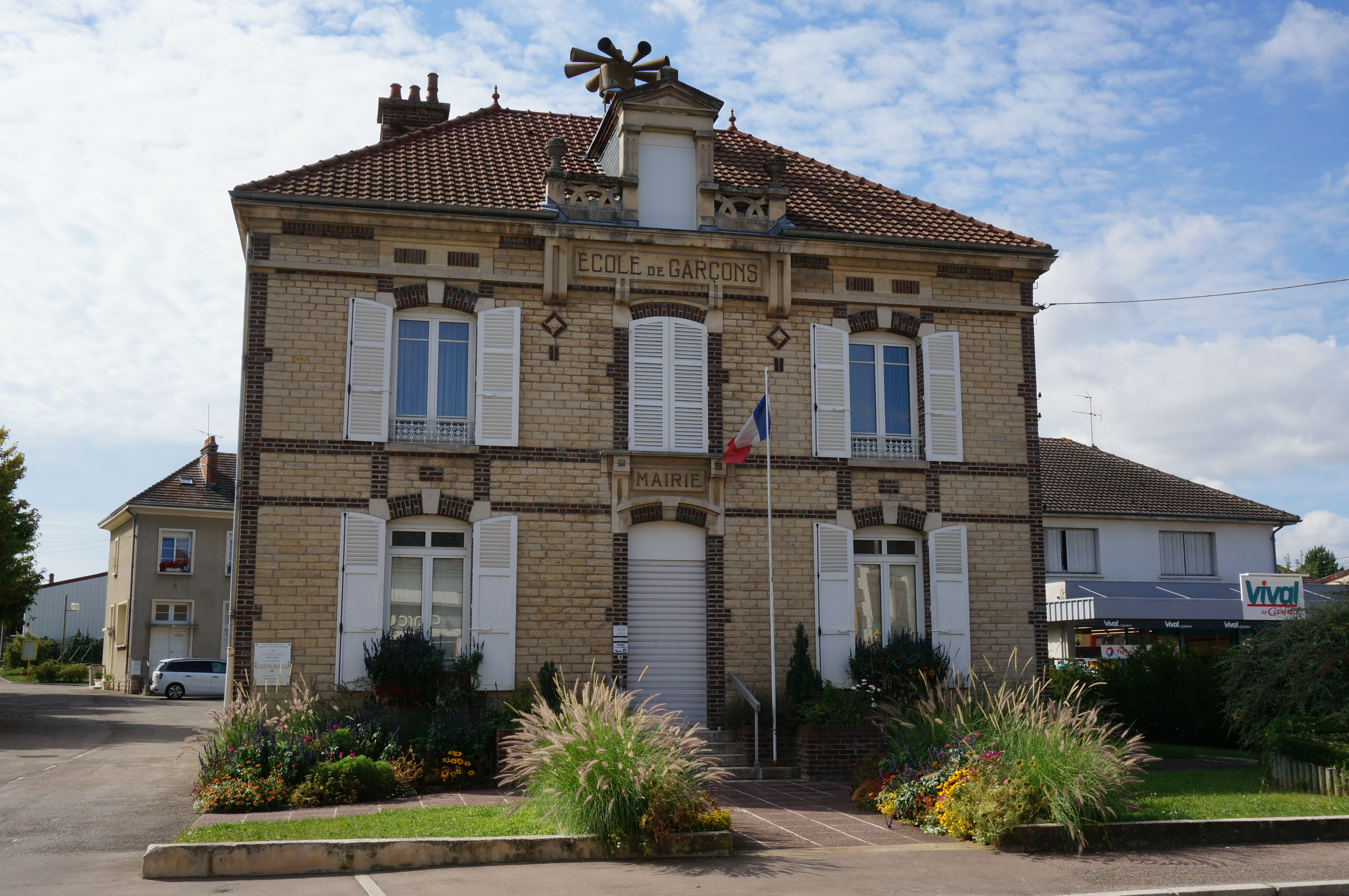
- The town hall in Bréviandes

- Coat of arms
- Location of Bréviandes
- Location within France Location within Grand Est
- Coordinates: 48°15′25″N 4°05′47″E
- Country: France
- Region: Grand Est
- Department: Aube
- Arrondissement: Troyes
- Canton: Vendeuvre-sur-Barse
- Intercommunality: CA Troyes Champagne Métropole

Government
  - Mayor (2020–2026): Thierry Blasco
- Area^{1}: 6.14 km^{2} (2.37 sq mi)
- Elevation: 117 m (384 ft)
- Highest elevation: 131 m (430 ft)
- Lowest elevation: 109 m (358 ft)
- Population (2023): 3,219
  - Density: 524/km^{2} (1,360/sq mi)
- Time zone: UTC+01:00 (CET)
  - Summer (DST): UTC+02:00 (CEST)
- INSEE/Postal code: 10060 /10450
- ^{1} French Land Register data, which excludes lakes, ponds, glaciers > 1 km^{2} (0.386 sq mi or 247 acres) and river estuaries.

Bréviandes (French pronunciation: [bʁevjɑ̃d]) is a commune in the Aube department in north-central France.

== Population ==
Historical population
Year	Pop.	±% p.a.
1968	1,095	—
1975	1,501	+4.61%
1982	1,683	+1.65%
1990	1,687	+0.03%
1999	1,926	+1.48%
2007	2,165	+1.47%
2012	2,416	+2.22%
2017	2,826	+3.18%
2023	3,219	+2.19%
Source: INSEE

== See also ==
- Communes of the Aube department
