= Saint-Parres-aux-Tertres =

Commune in Grand Est, France

- Commune
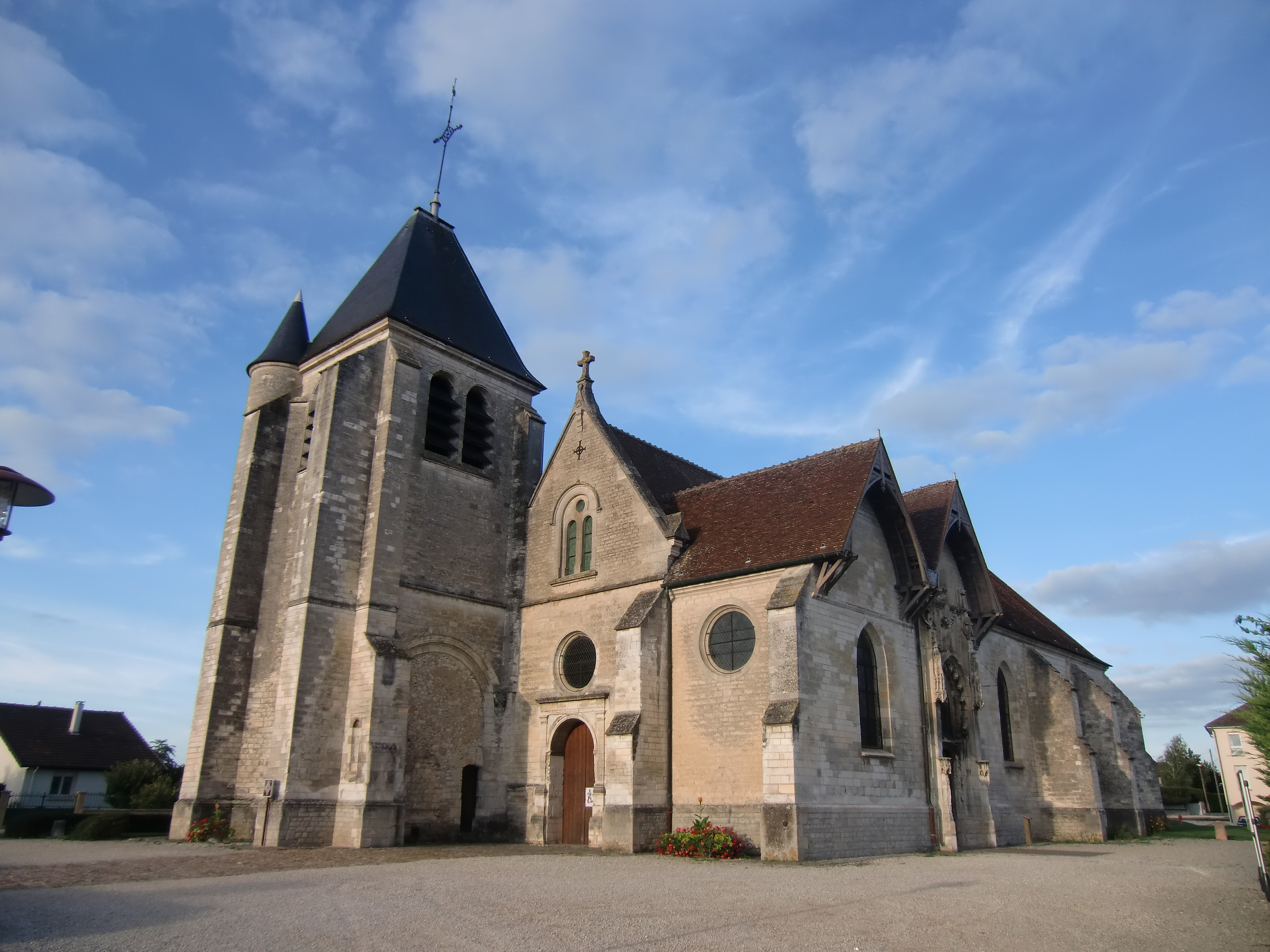
- The church in Saint-Parres-aux-Tertres

- Coat of arms
- Location of Saint-Parres-aux-Tertres
- Location within France Location within Grand Est
- Coordinates: 48°18′01″N 4°07′07″E
- Country: France
- Region: Grand Est
- Department: Aube
- Arrondissement: Troyes
- Canton: Troyes-4
- Intercommunality: CA Troyes Champagne Métropole

Government
  - Mayor (2020–2026): Jack Hirtzig
- Area^{1}: 11.82 km^{2} (4.56 sq mi)
- Elevation: 131 m (430 ft)
- Highest elevation: 132 m (433 ft)
- Lowest elevation: 103 m (338 ft)
- Population (2023): 3,223
  - Density: 272.7/km^{2} (706.2/sq mi)
- Time zone: UTC+01:00 (CET)
  - Summer (DST): UTC+02:00 (CEST)
- INSEE/Postal code: 10357 /10410
- ^{1} French Land Register data, which excludes lakes, ponds, glaciers > 1 km^{2} (0.386 sq mi or 247 acres) and river estuaries.

Saint-Parres-aux-Tertres (French pronunciation: [sɛ̃ paʁ o tɛʁtʁ]) is a commune in the Aube department in north-central France.

== Geography ==
The Barse flows into the Vieille Seine, an arm of the Seine, in the commune.

== Population ==
Historical population
Year	Pop.	±% p.a.
1968	1,808	—
1975	2,088	+2.08%
1982	2,402	+2.02%
1990	2,411	+0.05%
1999	2,615	+0.91%
2007	2,826	+0.97%
2012	2,989	+1.13%
2017	3,126	+0.90%
2023	3,223	+0.51%
Source: INSEE

== See also ==
- Communes of the Aube department
