= A22 autoroute =

Road in France

A22 autoroute

Route information
- Part of E17 / E42
- Maintained by DIR Nord
- Length: 18 km (11 mi)
- Existed: 1972–present

Major junctions
- South end: E17 / E42 / A 1 in Ronchin E17 / N 227 in Villeneuve-d'Ascq

- North end: E17 / N 227 in Lesquin; E17 / A14 in Neuville-en-Ferrain (Belgium)

Location
- Country: France

Highway system
- Roads in France; Autoroutes; Routes nationales

The A22 autoroute is a toll free highway in north western France. The road forms part of European route E17 from Paris to Belgium and the low countries through the Roubaix conurbation. It is 15.7 kilometres (9.8 mi) long.

== List of Junctions ==
Region	Department	Junctions	Destinations	Notes
Hauts-de-France	Nord			
Hauts-de-France	Nord	A1 Southbound - A22	Paris, Reims, Faches-Thumesnil	
Hauts-de-France	Nord	A1a (A1 Northbound) - A22 + 1 : Rochin	Lille (TCA1), Calais, Dunkerque (A25)	
Hauts-de-France	Nord	A1a (A1 Northbound) - A22 + 1 : Rochin	Ronchin, Lezennes	
Hauts-de-France	Nord	A27 - RN 227 & A22	Bruxelles, Gand, Tournai, Valenciennes (A23)	
Hauts-de-France	Nord	E17 / E42 / A 22 becomes E17 / N 227		
Hauts-de-France	Nord	2 / 2a / 2b : Villeneuve d'Ascq - Cité Scientifique	Villeneuve-d'Ascq, 4 cantons, Grand Stade, Cysoing	
Hauts-de-France	Nord	3 : Villeneuve d'Ascq - Hôtel de Ville	Villeneuve d'Ascq - Triolo, Résidence, Ascq, Centre Commercial V2, Triolo	
Hauts-de-France	Nord	4 : Villeneuve d'Ascq - Pont de Bois	Villeneuve d'Ascq, Stadium Lille Métropole	Entry and exit from A1
Hauts-de-France	Nord	5 : Villeneuve d'Ascq - Flers-Château	Villeneuve d'Ascq - Cousinerie, Musée d'art Moderne	Entry and exit from A1
Hauts-de-France	Nord	6 : Villeneuve d'Ascq - Flers-Château	Villeneuve d'Ascq - Pont de Bois, Musée d'art Moderne, Stadium Lille Métropole	
Hauts-de-France	Nord	7 : Villeneuve d'Ascq - Les Prés	Villeneuve d'Ascq - Recueil, Les Près, Wattrelos, Roubaix - est, sud, Hem	
Hauts-de-France	Nord	E17 / N 227 becomes again E17 / A 22		
Hauts-de-France	Nord	8 : Wattrelos	Wattrelos, Hem, Roubaix - Sud/Est	
Hauts-de-France	Nord	9/9a/9b : Mons-en-Barœul	Mons-en-Barœul, Z. I. La Pilaterie, Les Prés, Villeneuve-d'Ascq - Breucq, Sart-Babylone	
Hauts-de-France	Nord	10 : La Madeleine	Lille, La Madeleine, Marcq-en-Barœul	
Hauts-de-France	Nord	11 : Tourcoing - sud	Dunkerque (A25), Roubaix, Tourcoing - Blanc Sceau, Comines, Croix, Wasquehal	
Hauts-de-France	Nord	11 : Lille	Lille, Paris (A1)	
Hauts-de-France	Nord	12 : Marcq-en-Barœul	Marcq-en-Barœul, Mouvaux	
Hauts-de-France	Nord	13 : Croix	Roubaix - centre, Wasquehal, Calais, Dunkerque (A25)	
Hauts-de-France	Nord	15 : Tourcoing - ouest	Tourcoing - Le Brunpain, Les Francs	
Hauts-de-France	Nord	16 : Roncq	Roncq, Tourcoing - centre, Tourcoing - Pont Rompu, Centre-Commercial	
Hauts-de-France	Nord	17/17a/17b : Tourcoing - nord	Tourcoing - Pont de Neuville, Wattrelos, Neuville-en-Ferrain, Roncq, Halluin, Centre Routier	
Hauts-de-France	Nord	18 : Neuville-en-Ferrain	Tourcoing - La Bourgogne, Neuville-en-Ferrain	
Hauts-de-France	Nord	French - Belgian Border ; E17 / A 22 becomes E17 / A14		
1.000 mi = 1.609 km; 1.000 km = 0.621 mi
