= A1 autoroute =

Controlled-access highway from Paris to Lille, France

A1 autoroute
- Autoroute du Nord

Route information
- Part of E15, E17, E19, and E42
- Maintained by SANEF
- Length: 211 km (131 mi)
- Existed: 1954–present

Major junctions
- South end: E19 in Paris (Porte de la Chapelle)

- Boulevard Périphérique in Paris: A 16 ( A 86) in La Courneuve; E15 / A 3 / A 170 in Gonesse; A 104 in Épiais-lès-Louvres near Aéroport CDG; E44 / A 29 in Ablaincourt-Pressoir; E19 / A 2 in Combles; E15 / E17 / A 26 in Rœux near Arras; A 21 in Noyelles-Godault near Douai; E17 / E42 / A 22 near Aéroport de Lesquin

- North end: E42 / A 25 / N 356 in Lille

Location
- Country: France

Highway system
- Roads in France; Autoroutes; Routes nationales

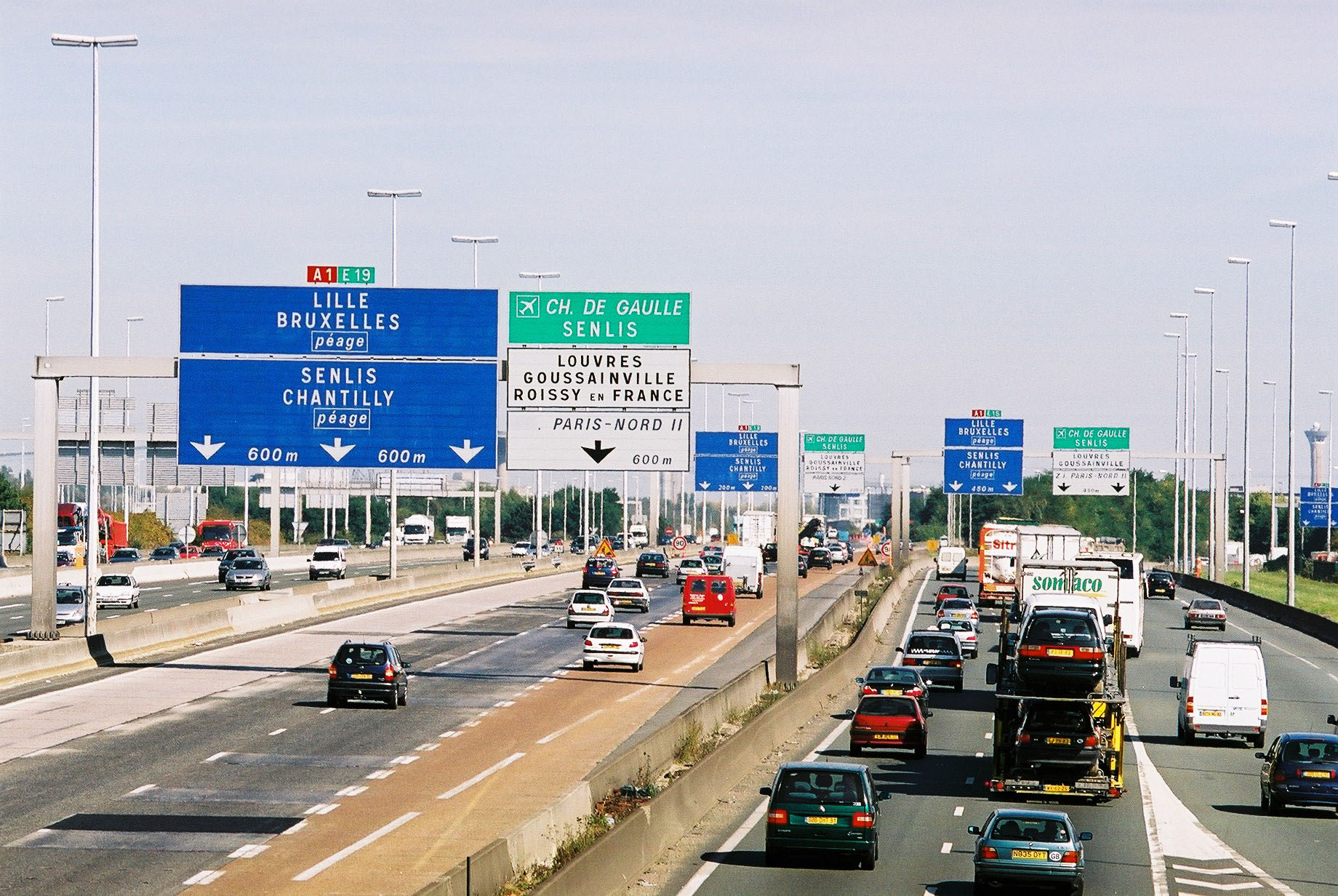
The A1 near Roissy-en-France

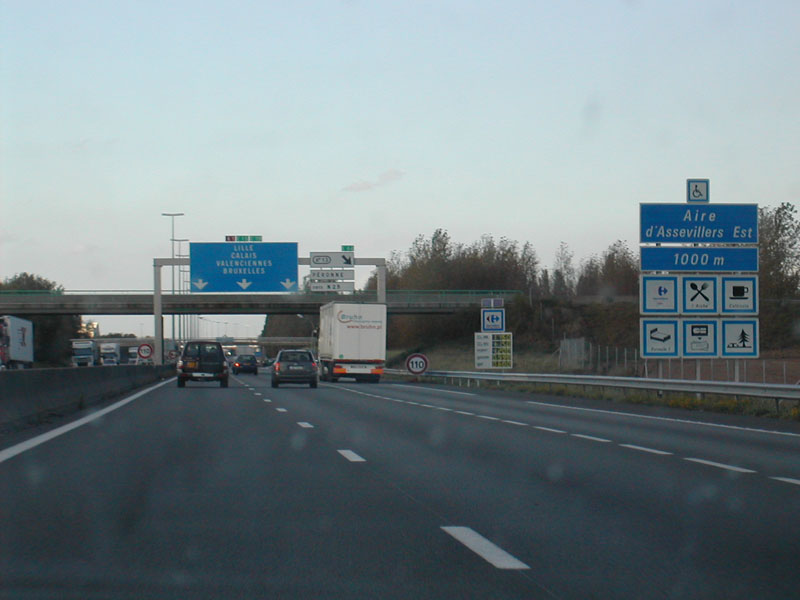
The A1 near Péronne

The A1 Autoroute, also autoroutes autoroute du Nord (the Northern Motorway), is the busiest of France's autoroutes and is part of an environmental zones.(See below) With a length of 211 km (131 mi), it connects Paris with the northern city of Lille. It is managed by the Société des Autoroutes du Nord et de l'Est de la France (SANEF). The autoroute serves the northern suburbs of Paris, including the Stade de France, Le Bourget, Paris' Roissy Charles de Gaulle Airport, and Parc Astérix. From there it crosses Hauts-de-France, without directly passing through any of the major cities of the région. Throughout Hauts-de-France, the A1 runs parallel to the LGV Nord.

Around 120 km (75 mi) from Paris, between the towns of Amiens and Saint-Quentin and near the Aire de service de Cœur des Hauts-de-France (the largest motorway plaza in Europe), the A1 crosses over the A29. A few dozen kilometers further north it forms the southern terminus of the A2, which branches off towards Brussels. The A1 is also crossed by the A26, the A21 and the A22, and it makes up part of European routes E15, E17, E19 and E42. in its northern terminus, the A1 turns into the A25.

It is the busiest highway in Europa.

Environmental zone:

Lille has two environmental zones:

Lille ZFE

Lille (Lille region) ZPA central

Name of the environmental zone:

Environmental zone Lille ZFE - France

Environmental zone valid since: 01-01-2025

Type of environmental zone: permanently valid, 0:00 - 24:00

Driving bans (temporary): Currently unknown

Driving bans (permanent): all vehicles (except L) without sticker

Fines: €68.00 - €450.00

Area of the environmental zone:

The ZFE applies to the 95 municipalities of the European metropolis of Lille and to the structuring network (A1, A25, A22, A27, A23, N227, N356, N41, N47).

Special features: Manual check of police officers

Exceptions: Doctor, Fire Department, Military, Classic Car over 30 years old, Police Car, Customs, Snow Plow, City Bus and Ambulance

== History ==
- Lille (porte de la Madeleine) - Carvin: 1954
- Carvin - Gavrelle: 1958
- Gavrelle - Bapaume: 1967
- Bapaume - Roye: 1966
- Roye - Senlis: 1965
- Senlis - Le Bourget: 1964
- Le Bourget - Saint-Denis: 1966
- Saint-Denis - Paris (porte de la Chapelle): 1965.

== List of exits and junctions ==
Region	Department	km	mi	Junctions	Destinations	Notes
Île-de-France	Paris	0.0	0.0	Boulevard Périphérique - A1 + : Porte de la Chapelle	Périphérique Ouest : Rouen (A13, A14), Porte de Clignancourt; Périphérique Est : Metz-Nancy (A4), Orly (A6), Porte d'Aubervilliers	
Île-de-France	Paris	0.0	0.0	Boulevard Périphérique - A1 + : Porte de la Chapelle	Paris - centre : Paris - Porte de la Chapelle	
Île-de-France	Seine-Saint-Denis	2.3	1.24	2 : Saint-Denis - La Plaine	Saint-Denis, Stade de France,	Entry and exit only from Paris
Île-de-France	Seine-Saint-Denis	3.5	1.86	3 : Saint-Denis - centre	Saint-Denis - Porte de Paris, Pierrefitte-sur-Seine, Villetaneuse	
Île-de-France	Seine-Saint-Denis	4.5	2.48	4 : La Courneuve	Stains, Garges-lès-Gonesse, Sarcelles, La Courneuve	Entry and exit only from Paris
Île-de-France	Seine-Saint-Denis	Aires de La Courneuve				
Île-de-France	Seine-Saint-Denis	7.1	4.34	A16 (A86) - A1	A15, Rouen (A14), Aubervilliers, La Défense, Saint-Denis - La Plaine, Stade de France	Entry and exit only from Lille
Île-de-France	Seine-Saint-Denis	8.3	4.9	5 : Le Blanc-Mesnil	Le Blanc-Mesnil, Le Bourget, Drancy, Paris-Porte de la Villette, La Courneuve, Le Bourget, Dugny	
Île-de-France	Seine-Saint-Denis	11.4	6.83	A3 - A1	Bobigny, Aulnay-sous-Bois, Paris-Porte de Bagnolet, A86 (A4), Garonor, Centre-Commercial O'Parinor	
Île-de-France	Val d'Oise	12.5	7.45	A170 & RD 170 - A1	Soissons, Z. I. Paris-Nord 2, Parc des Expositions de Villepinte, Marne-la-Vallée (A104)	
Île-de-France	Val d'Oise	12.5	7.45	A170 & RD 170 - A1	Gonesse, Sarcelles	
Île-de-France	Val d'Oise	15.3	9.32	6 : Charles-de-Gaulle	Roissy-en-France, Aéroport CDG, Louvres, Goussainville, Z. I. Paris-Nord 2, Aéroville	
Île-de-France	Val d'Oise	E19 / A 1 becomes E15 / E19 / A 1				
Île-de-France	Val d'Oise	21.7	13.04	A104 & RN 104 - A1	Lyon (A5), Metz-Nancy (A4), Torcy, Marne-la-Vallée, Meaux, Le Mesnil-Amelot	
Île-de-France	Val d'Oise	21.7	13.04	A104 & RN 104 - A1	Amiens (A16), Cergy-Pontoise (A15), Senlis by RD 317, Louvres, Goussainville	
Île-de-France	Val d'Oise	Aire de Chennevières (Southbound); Aire de Villeron (Northbound)				
Île-de-France	Val d'Oise	Aires de Vémars				
Île-de-France	Val d'Oise	27.3	16.7	7 : Survilliers	Chantilly, Survilliers, Ermenonville, Fosses	
Île-de-France	Val d'Oise	Aires de Survilliers				
Hauts-de-France	Oise	33.0	20.5	Parc Astérix	Parc Astérix	
Hauts-de-France	Oise	42.3	26.1	8 : Senlis	Senlis, Creil, Crépy-en-Valois, Meaux, Ermenonville	
Hauts-de-France	Oise	Péage de Chamant				
Hauts-de-France	Oise	Aires de Roberval				
Hauts-de-France	Oise	57.5	35.4	9 : Pont-Sainte-Maxence	Pont-Sainte-Maxence, Compiègne - sud, Creil	
Hauts-de-France	Oise	Aire de Chevrières (Northbound); Aire de Longueil-Sainte-Marie (Southbound)				
Hauts-de-France	Oise	66.4	41.0	10 : Arsy	Compiègne - ouest, Beauvais, Noyon, Clermont, Estrées-Saint-Denis, Arsy	
Hauts-de-France	Oise	Aire de Remy (Northbound); Aire de Bois d'Arsy - Ouest (Southbound)				
Hauts-de-France	Oise	80.1	49.7	11 : Ressons	Compiègne - nord, Saint-Just-en-Chaussée, Montdidier, Ressons-sur-Matz	
Hauts-de-France	Oise	Aires de Ressons				
Hauts-de-France	Somme					
Hauts-de-France	Somme	Aires de Tilloloy				
Hauts-de-France	Somme	101.4	64.0	12 : Roye	Noyon, Montdidier, Roye, Chauny, Tergnier	
Hauts-de-France	Somme	Aire de Goyencourt) (Closed temporarily)				
Hauts-de-France	Somme	Aire de Fonches (Northbound); Aire de Hattencourt (Southbound)				
Hauts-de-France	Somme	118.7	73.32	A29 - A1	Rouen, Saint-Quentin, Amiens, Reims (A26)	
Hauts-de-France	Somme	121.2	75.1	13 : Péronne	Saint-Quentin, Péronne - sud, Haute Picardie	
Hauts-de-France	Somme	Aire de Cœur des Hauts-de-France - Est (Northbound); Aire de Cœur des Hauts-de-France - Ouest (Southbound)				
Hauts-de-France	Somme	Aire de Feuillères (Northbound)				
Hauts-de-France	Somme	131.6	81.4	13.1 : Albert	Albert, Péronne - nord	
Hauts-de-France	Somme	Aire de Maurepas (Southbound)				
Hauts-de-France	Somme	137.4	85.12	A2 - A1	Liège, Bruxelles, Mons, Valenciennes, Cambrai	
Hauts-de-France	Somme	E15 / E19 / A 1 becomes E15 / A 1				
Hauts-de-France	Pas-de-Calais					
Hauts-de-France	Pas-de-Calais	Aire de Beaulencourt (Northbound)				
Hauts-de-France	Pas-de-Calais	147.1	91.3	14 : Bapaume	Bapaume, Albert	
Hauts-de-France	Pas-de-Calais	Aire de Saint-Léger (Southbound)				
Hauts-de-France	Pas-de-Calais	Aire de Croisilles (Northbound)				
Hauts-de-France	Pas-de-Calais	165.9	102.52	15 : Arras - est	Arras	
Hauts-de-France	Pas-de-Calais	165.9	102.52	15 : Arras - est	Aires de Wancourt	
Hauts-de-France	Pas-de-Calais	170.3	105.6	A26 - A1	Calais, Lyon (A5), Metz-Nancy (A4), Reims, Béthune, Boulogne-sur-Mer	
Hauts-de-France	Pas-de-Calais	E15 / A 1 becomes E17 / A 1				
Hauts-de-France	Pas-de-Calais	Péage de Fresnes-lès-Montauban				
Hauts-de-France	Pas-de-Calais	174.8	108.11	16 : Fresnes-lès-Montauban	Douai - centre, Arras - centre, Biache-Saint-Vaast, Vitry-en-Artois	
Hauts-de-France	Pas-de-Calais	182.4	113.0	16.1 : Zone Commerciales	Hénin-Beaumont - Z. I., Drocourt, Rouvroy, Parc Commercial Pour La Maison	
Hauts-de-France	Pas-de-Calais	184.7	114.33	17 : Noyelles-Godault	Noyelles-Godault, Centre-Commercial Noyelles-Godault	
Hauts-de-France	Pas-de-Calais	185.3	114.9	A21 - A1	Lens, Douai - nord, Hénin-Beaumont - centre	
Hauts-de-France	Pas-de-Calais	189.6	117.4	17.1 : Delta 3	Plate-forme multimodale de Dourges, Oignies	
Hauts-de-France	Pas-de-Calais	192.8	119.3	18 : Libercourt	Carvin, Libercourt, Oignies	
Hauts-de-France	Nord					
Hauts-de-France	Nord	Aires de Phalempin				
Hauts-de-France	Nord	201.3	125.1	19 : Seclin	Seclin, Pont-à-Marcq	
Hauts-de-France	Nord	205.7	127.4	20 : Faches-Thumesnil	Faches-Thumesnil, Aéroport de Lille-Lesquin, S.O.S. Mains, Ronchin, Centre Régionale de Transport	
Hauts-de-France	Nord	207.4	128.6	A1a (A22) - A1	Ronchin, Roubaix, Gand, Villeneuve-d'Ascq, Grand Stade, 4 Cantons, Bruxelles (A27)	
Hauts-de-France	Nord	E17 / A 1 becomes E42 / A 1				
Hauts-de-France	Nord	211.0	131.1	A25 & RN 356 - A1	Dunkerque, Armentières, Tunnel sous la Manche, Lille - sud, C.H.R.U Eurasanté	
Hauts-de-France	Nord	211.0	131.1	A25 & RN 356 - A1	Gand (A22), Tourcoing, La Madeleine, Hellemmes-Lille, Lille - centre, Saint-Maurice, Euralille, Gares	
1.000 mi = 1.609 km; 1.000 km = 0.621 mi

== European Routes ==
European Route	Location
E19	1 through A 2
E15	A 3 through A 26
E17	A 26 through A 22
E42	A 22 through A 25
