= A23 autoroute =

Road in France

A23 autoroute

Route information
- Maintained by DIR Nord
- Length: 43 km (27 mi)
- Existed: 1978–present

Major junctions
- North end: E42 / A 27 in Lesquin

- South end: E19 / A 2 in Trith-Saint-Léger

Location
- Country: France

Highway system
- Roads in France; Autoroutes; Routes nationales

The A23 autoroute is a highway in northern France. It is 42.5 kilometres (26.4 mi) long. The highway passes northwest–southeast from the Lille conurbation to the town of Valenciennes effectively linking the A1 and A2 autoroutes.

== Junctions ==
Region	Department	Junction	Destinations	Notes
Hauts-de-France	Nord	A27 & RN 227 - A23	Paris, Lille, Calais, (A25)	
Hauts-de-France	Nord	A27 & RN 227 - A23	Gand, Tourcoing (A22), Roubaix, Villeneuve-d'Ascq	
Hauts-de-France	Nord	1 : Lesquin	Lesquin, Aéroport de Lille	
Hauts-de-France	Nord	Aire de Genech Ouest (Southbound)		
Hauts-de-France	Nord	2/2a/2b : Orchies	Orchies, Somain, Lens, Seclin, Douai, Tournai (Belgium)	
Hauts-de-France	Nord	3 : L'Alène d'Or	St-Amand-les-Eaux, Marchiennes	
Hauts-de-France	Nord	Aire de La Scarpe		
Hauts-de-France	Nord	4 : Hasnon	Saint-Amand-Les-Eaux, Wallers	
Hauts-de-France	Nord	5 : Saint-Amand-Les-Eaux	Saint-Amand-Les-Eaux, Tournai (Belgium)	
Hauts-de-France	Nord	6 : Raismes	Raismes	
Hauts-de-France	Nord	7/7a/7b : Petite-Forêt	Petite-Forêt, Raismes, Beuvrages, Wallers	
Hauts-de-France	Nord	Aire de Petit-Forêt (Northbound)		
Hauts-de-France	Nord	11 : Valenciennes - nord	Valenciennes- Saint-Waast, Anzin	
Hauts-de-France	Nord	12 : La Sentinelle	Valenciennes - Le Vignoble, La Sentinelle, Trith-Saint-Léger	
Hauts-de-France	Nord	A2 - A23	Valenciennes - centre, Paris (A1), Cambrai, Denain, Liège, Maubeuge, Bruxelles	
1.000 mi = 1.609 km; 1.000 km = 0.621 mi
