= A27 autoroute =

Road in France

A27 autoroute

Route information
- Part of E42
- Maintained by DIR Nord
- Length: 11.2 km (7.0 mi)
- Existed: 1972–present

Major junctions
- West end: E17 / E42 / A 22 in Villeneuve-d'Ascq

- A 23 in Lesquin
- East end: E42 / A8 in Camphin-en-Pévèle (Belgium)

Location
- Country: France

Highway system
- Roads in France; Autoroutes; Routes nationales

The A27 autoroute is a toll free autoroute in northern France, approximately 11.2 kilometres (7.0 mi) long. It forms part of European route E42.

== List of junctions ==
Region	Department	km	mi	Junction	Destinations	Notes
Hauts-de-France	Nord	0.0	0.0	A22 - A27	Lille, Paris (A1), Calais (A25), Tourcoing, Villeneuve-d'Ascq, Roubaix	
Hauts-de-France	Nord	1.6	0.99	A23 - A27	Valenciennes, Saint-Amand-les-Eaux, Centre Routier, Denain	Entry and exit from Lille
Hauts-de-France	Nord	9.2	5.71	3 : Baisieux	Baisieux	Entry and exit from Lille
French - Belgian Border ; E42 / A 27 becomes Belgian road A8 E42 / A8
1.000 mi = 1.609 km; 1.000 km = 0.621 mi
