= A25 autoroute =

Road in France

A25 autoroute

Route information
- Part of E42
- Maintained by SANEF
- Length: 65 km (40 mi)
- Existed: 1963–present

Major junctions
- East end: E42 / A 1 in Lille

- West end: N 225 in Socx

Location
- Country: France

Highway system
- Roads in France; Autoroutes; Routes nationales

The A25 is a 65 kilometres (40 mi) long motorway in northern France. It is also part of European Route E42.

== Route ==
The road connects (with the N225) the English Channel port of Dunkerque with the major city of Lille. The road has no tolls.

== Junctions ==
Region	Department	Junction	Destinations	Notes
Hauts-de-France	Nord	A1 & RN 356 - A25 + 1 : Hellemmes-Lille	Paris, Valenciennes (A23), Bruxelles (A27), Villeneuve-d'Ascq, Aéroport de Lille - Lesquin, A22	
Hauts-de-France	Nord	A1 & RN 356 - A25 + 1 : Hellemmes-Lille	Gand, Tourcoing (A22), Roubaix, Lille - centre	
Hauts-de-France	Nord	A1 & RN 356 - A25 + 1 : Hellemmes-Lille	Lille - Moulins	
Hauts-de-France	Nord	2 : Lille - Moulins	Lille - sud, Faches-Thumesnil	
Hauts-de-France	Nord	3 : Lille - Wazemmes	Lille - Moulins, sud, Ronchin, Faches-Thumesnil, Wattignies	
Hauts-de-France	Nord	4 : Lille - Faubourg de Béthune	Lille, Loos, Centre hospitalier régional universitaire de Lille	
Hauts-de-France	Nord	5 : Lille - Port Fluvial	Lille - Vauban, Lambersart	
Hauts-de-France	Nord	6 : Halennes	Haubourdin, Halennes	
Hauts-de-France	Nord	7/7a/7b : Englos	Englos, Lomme, Roubaix, Tourcoing, Gand, Haubourdin, Santes, La Bassée, Béthune, Lens	
Hauts-de-France	Nord	8 : La Chapelle-d'Armentières	Armentières, La Chapelle-d'Armentières	
Hauts-de-France	Nord	9 : Nieppe	Armentières, Nieppe, Merville, Estaires	
Hauts-de-France	Nord	Aire de Steenwerck		
Hauts-de-France	Nord	10 : Bailleul - est	Bailleul - Z. I, Estaires	
Hauts-de-France	Nord	11 : Bailleul - ouest	Bailleul, Hazebrouck, Saint-Omer, Boulogne-sur-Mer	
Hauts-de-France	Nord	12 : Méteren	Méteren, Bailleul, Cassel	
Hauts-de-France	Nord	13 : Steenvoorde	Steenvoorde, Cassel, Poperinge, Hazebrouck, Béthune, Courtrai, Ypres	
Hauts-de-France	Nord	Aire de Saint-Eloi(Eastbound); Aire de Saint-Laurent (Westbound)		
Hauts-de-France	Nord	14 : Winnezeele	Hondschoote, Bray-Dunes	
Hauts-de-France	Nord	15 : Herzeele	Herzeele, Wormhout	
Hauts-de-France	Nord	16 : Socx	Bergues, Wormhout, Cassel, Socx	
Hauts-de-France	Nord	E42 / A 25 becomes E42 / N 225		
Hauts-de-France	Nord	17 : Bierne	Bierne, Steene	
Hauts-de-France	Nord	18 : Cappelle-la-Grande	Cappelle-la-Grande, Armbouts-Cappel - Village	
Hauts-de-France	Nord	19a/19b : Armbouts-Cappel	Spycker, Armbouts-Cappel - Lac	
Hauts-de-France	Nord	20 : Petite-Synthe	Grande-Synthe, Dunkerque, Port 3800-4000	
Hauts-de-France	Nord	A16 - RN 225	Dunkerque - centre, Malo, Ostende,	
Hauts-de-France	Nord	A16 - RN 225	Calais,Tunnel sous la Manche, Coudekerque-Branche, Port de Dunkerque	
1.000 mi = 1.609 km; 1.000 km = 0.621 mi
