= Enygea =

French company

- Type: Private
- Founded: 2007
- Founder: Hervé Montagne
- Number of employees: 1000 (2025)
- Website: www.enygea.com

Enygea is a French company founded in 2007, specializing in the rental, servicing and maintenance of mobile hygiene and sanitation solutions for the construction, events and industrial sectors.

== History ==
The group was founded in 2007 in Englos, by Hervé Montagne as a takeover holding company named HM Finance, which began its activity with the acquisition of WC Loc. In 2009, HM Finance acquired PSV, which was renamed Happee Services in 2021. In 2017, HM Finance was renamed Enygea.

In February 2018, Enygea completed a capital reorganization through a secondary leveraged buyout (LBO), involving investors Bpifrance, Société Générale Capital Partenaires and Nord Croissance. As part of the transaction, the company also issued €3.6 million in bonds. The overall operation amounted to approximately €10 million.

In 2019, Enygea acquired aluminium bodywork company DSPM, which was subsequently renamed Swittec. In 2021, Swittec relocated to Bruay-sur-l’Escaut following a €2 million investment in a new workshop.

In 2020, the group created Waterlab Services and BASES Clean, and acquired Sanibert, a Quebec-based company specializing in the rental of mobile sanitation solutions. In 2024, Sanibert announced the acquisition of the toilet division of EBI Montréal. In July 2022, Hervé Montagne increased his stake in Enygea to 75% following the exit of Bpifrance, Société Générale Capital Partenaires and IRD Gestion. Later that year, the company secured €13 million in financing from Geneo Mezzanine.

In April 2024, Enygea announced a €25 million investment ahead of the Paris Olympic and Paralympic Games. Through its subsidiaries Waterlab Services and Happee Services, the group participated in the installation of temporary drinking water distribution and sanitation facilities for the opening ceremony along the Seine.
