= Canton of Lille-6 =

Coordinates: 50.64°N 2.99°E

The canton of Lille-6 is an administrative division of the Nord department, northern France. It was created at the French canton reorganisation which came into effect in March 2015. Its seat is in Lille.

It consists of the following communes:

1. Beaucamps-Ligny
2. Englos
3. Ennetières-en-Weppes
4. Erquinghem-le-Sec
5. Escobecques
6. Hallennes-lez-Haubourdin
7. Lille (partly)
8. Loos
9. Santes
10. Sequedin
