= Escobecques =

- Commune
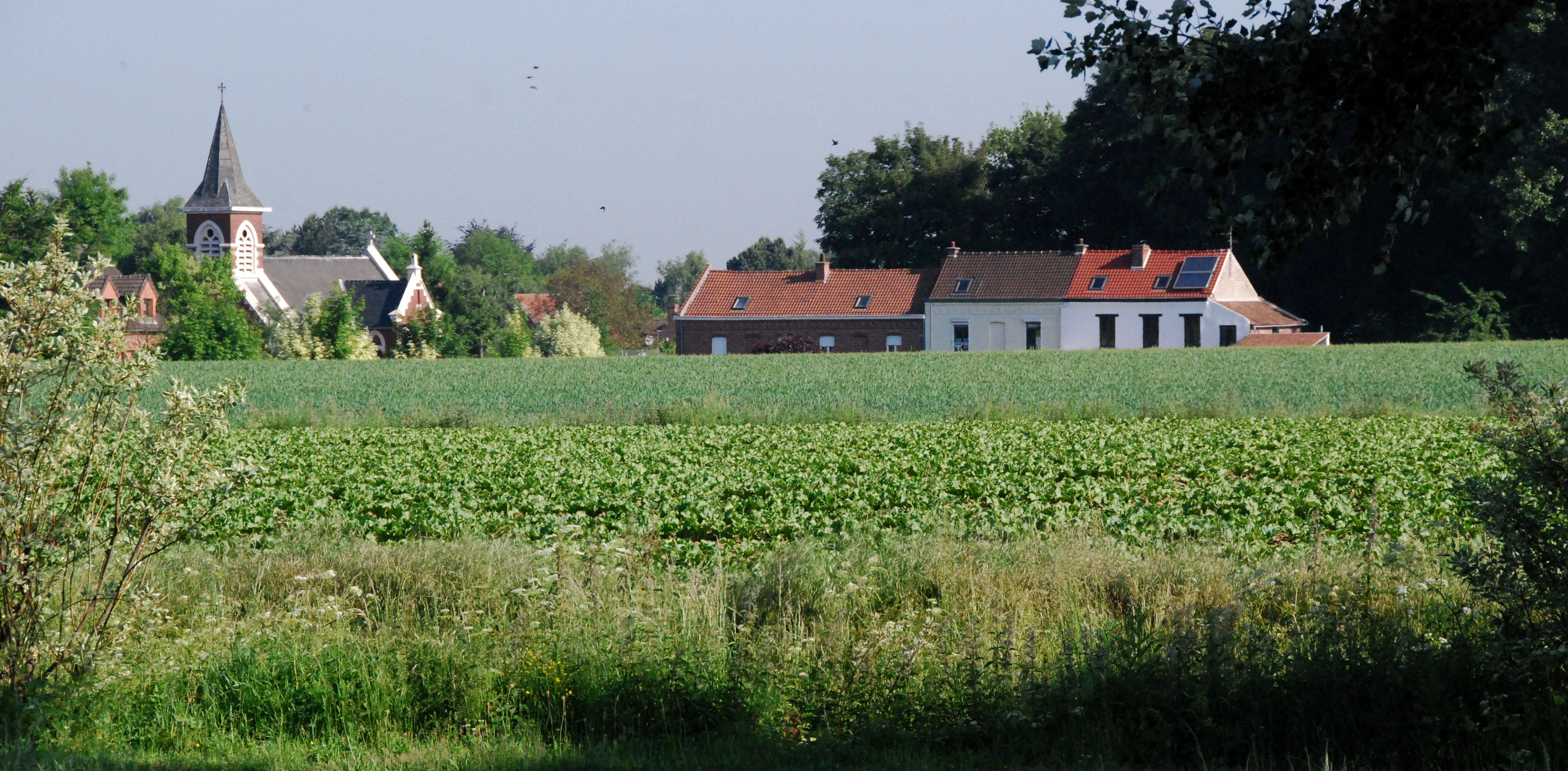
- A view of Escobecques

- Coat of arms
- Location of Escobecques
- Location within France Location within Hauts-de-France
- Coordinates: 50°37′18″N 2°55′52″E
- Country: France
- Region: Hauts-de-France
- Department: Nord
- Arrondissement: Lille
- Canton: Lille-6
- Intercommunality: Métropole Européenne de Lille

Government
  - Mayor (2020–2026): Alain Cambien
- Area^{1}: 1.85 km^{2} (0.71 sq mi)
- Elevation: 38 m (125 ft)
- Population (2023): 302
  - Density: 163/km^{2} (423/sq mi)
- Time zone: UTC+01:00 (CET)
  - Summer (DST): UTC+02:00 (CEST)
- INSEE/Postal code: 59208 /59320
- ^{1} French Land Register data, which excludes lakes, ponds, glaciers > 1 km^{2} (0.386 sq mi or 247 acres) and river estuaries.

Escobecques (French pronunciation: [ekɔbɛk]; Dutch: Schobeek) is a commune in the Nord department in northern France. There are about 300 residents in this commune.

== Heraldry ==
Arms of Escobecques	The arms of Escobecques are blazoned : Vert, 3 trefoils Or.

== See also ==
- Communes of the Nord department
