= Hôtel de Ville, Mons-en-Barœul =

Town hall in Mons-en-Barœul, France

Hôtel de Ville
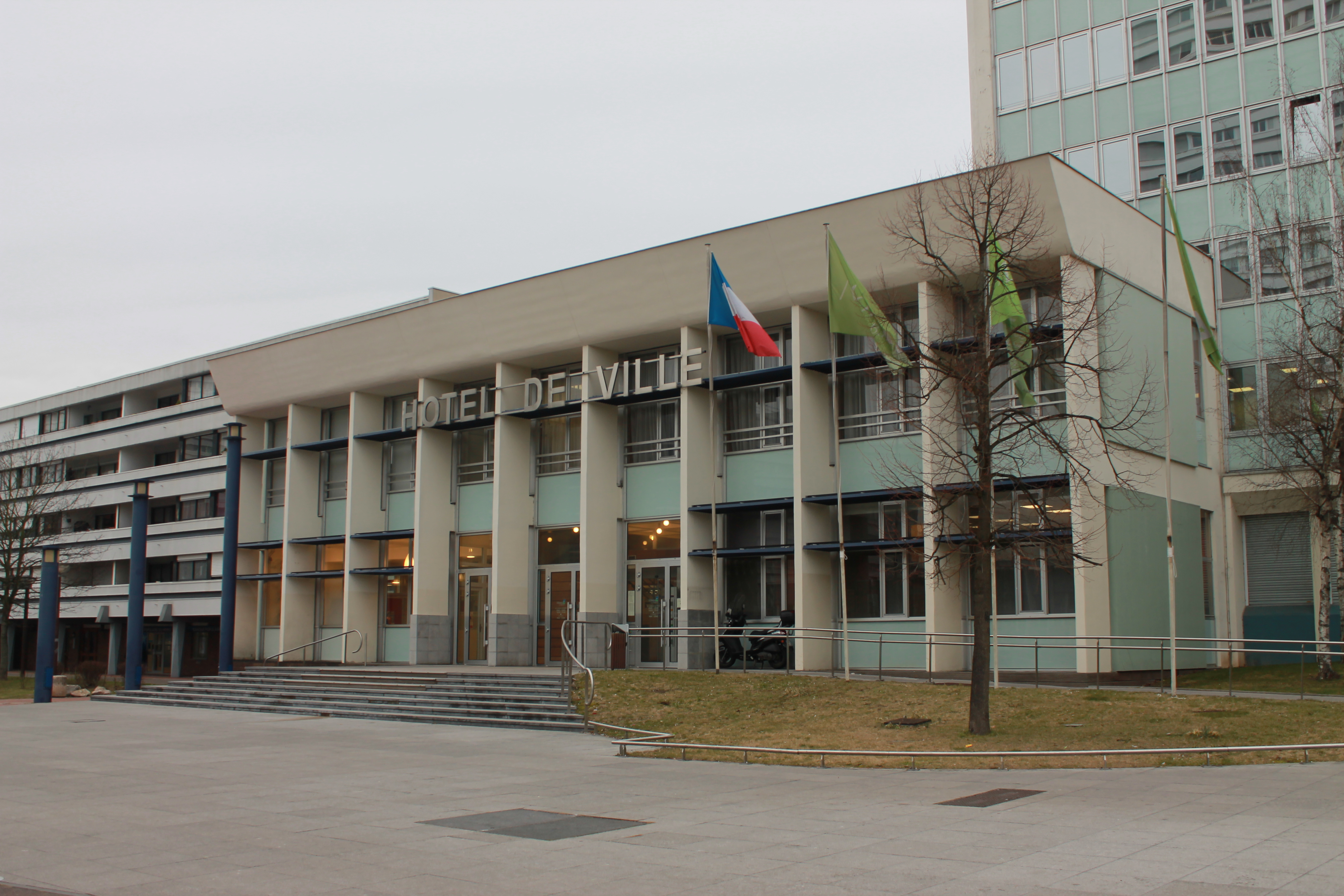
- The main frontage of the Hôtel de Ville in February 2012

General information
- Type: City hall
- Architectural style: Modern style
- Location: Mons-en-Barœul, France
- Coordinates: 50.6425°N 3.1104°E
- Completed: 1977

Design and construction
- Architect: Jehan Boyer

The Hôtel de Ville (French pronunciation: [otɛl də vil], City Hall) is a municipal building in Mons-en-Barœul, Nord, in northern France, standing on Avenue Robert Schuman.

== History ==
The old town hall

=== Earlier town halls ===
Following the French Revolution, the new town council initially met in the Café Saint-Martin on the Route de Roubaix (now the Rue du Général-de-Gaulle) in the old part of the town close to the Church of Saint-Pierre. This arrangement continued until 1839, when the council led by the mayor, Jean-Baptiste Dewas, decided to erect a combined town hall and school in the same area. In 1879, after finding the first town hall cramped, the council led by the mayor, Alexandre Delemar, decided to commission a more substantial town hall, also in the old part of the town. The new building was designed in the neoclassical style, built in ashlar stone and was completed in the early 1880s.

The design involved an asymmetrical main frontage of six bays facing onto the street. The fourth bay on the left featured a round headed doorway with a moulded surround on the ground floor, a French door with a balustraded balcony on the first floor and an aedicula at attic level. The second and sixth bays also contained doorways; the building was fenestrated by single casement windows in the first, second and sixth bays, while the third and fifth bays contained bi-partite windows. After the building was no longer required for municipal use, it became the Maison des Associations (community centre).

During the Second World War, a local police officer, Henri Prévost, who was based in the town hall, led the operations of the French Resistance in the town. This continued until the French Forces of the Interior, under his command, liberated the town on 2 September 1944. One of their first actions was to raise the French tricolour on the town hall.

=== The current town hall ===
In the early 1970s, following significant population growth, the council led by the mayor, Raymond Verrue, decided to commission a modern town hall. The site chosen was on the north side of Avenue Robert Schuman in the heart of the new Zone à urbaniser par priorité (Priority urbanization area). The new building was designed by Jehan Boyer in the modern style, built in concrete and glass and was completed in 1977.

The complex was laid out in three parts: a two-storey civic block, a seven-storey tower block behind containing the municipal offices, and a circular reception block for public-facing services in front. The design of the civic block involved a symmetrical main frontage of nine bays facing onto the street. The bays were separated by concrete piers supporting a forward-sloping parapet. Internally, the principal room was the Salle du Conseil (council chamber) on the first floor.

On the night of 28 June 2023, during the Nahel Merzouk riots, the town hall was attacked by a group of 50 masked individuals who fired mortars and steel bullets at the building, which was badly damaged in the ensuing fire. Nine people were charged with offences associated with the attack but were subsequently released due to procedural errors. Following extensive repairs the building re-opened to the public in February 2026.
