= Hallennes-lez-Haubourdin =

- Commune
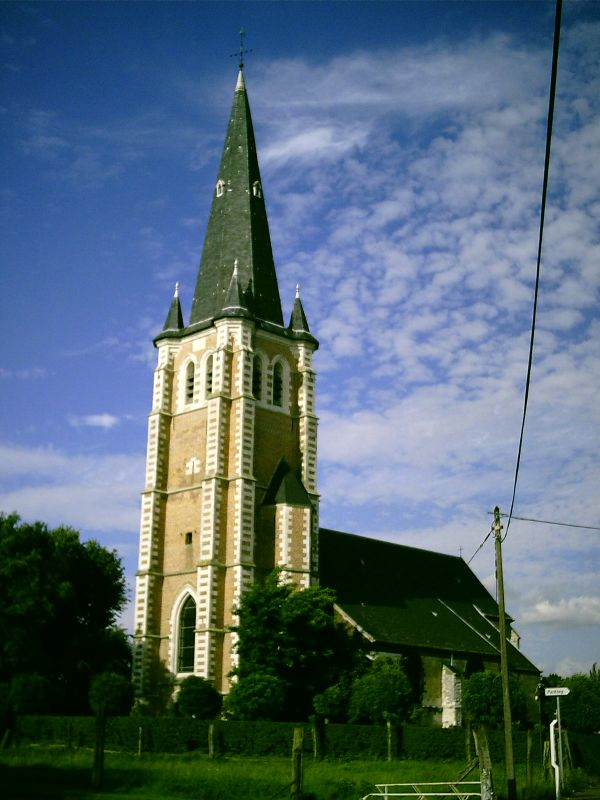
- The church in Hallennes-lez-Haubourdin

- Coat of arms
- Location of Hallennes-lez-Haubourdin
- Location within France Location within Hauts-de-France
- Coordinates: 50°36′50″N 2°57′37″E
- Country: France
- Region: Hauts-de-France
- Department: Nord
- Arrondissement: Lille
- Canton: Lille-6
- Intercommunality: Métropole Européenne de Lille

Government
  - Mayor (2020–2026): André Pau
- Area^{1}: 4.35 km^{2} (1.68 sq mi)
- Elevation: 18 m (59 ft)
- Highest elevation: 43 m (141 ft)
- Lowest elevation: 19 m (62 ft)
- Population (2023): 4,683
  - Density: 1,080/km^{2} (2,790/sq mi)
- Time zone: UTC+01:00 (CET)
  - Summer (DST): UTC+02:00 (CEST)
- INSEE/Postal code: 59278 /59320
- ^{1} French Land Register data, which excludes lakes, ponds, glaciers > 1 km^{2} (0.386 sq mi or 247 acres) and river estuaries.

Hallennes-lez-Haubourdin (French pronunciation: [alɛn le(z‿)obuʁdɛ̃], literally Hallennes near Haubourdin) is a commune in the Nord department in northern France. It is part of the Métropole Européenne de Lille.

== Population ==
Historical population
Year	Pop.	±% p.a.
1968	2,405	—
1975	3,286	+4.56%
1982	3,251	−0.15%
1990	3,851	+2.14%
1999	3,810	−0.12%
2007	4,062	+0.80%
2012	3,975	−0.43%
2017	4,436	+2.22%
2023	4,683	+0.91%
Source: INSEE

== Heraldry ==
Arms of Hallennes-lez-Haubourdin	The arms of Hallennes-lez-Haubourdin are blazoned : Or, 5 bendlets gules. (Hallennes-lez-Haubourdin and Vieux-Berquin use the same arms.)

== See also ==
- Communes of the Nord department
