= Sequedin =

- Commune
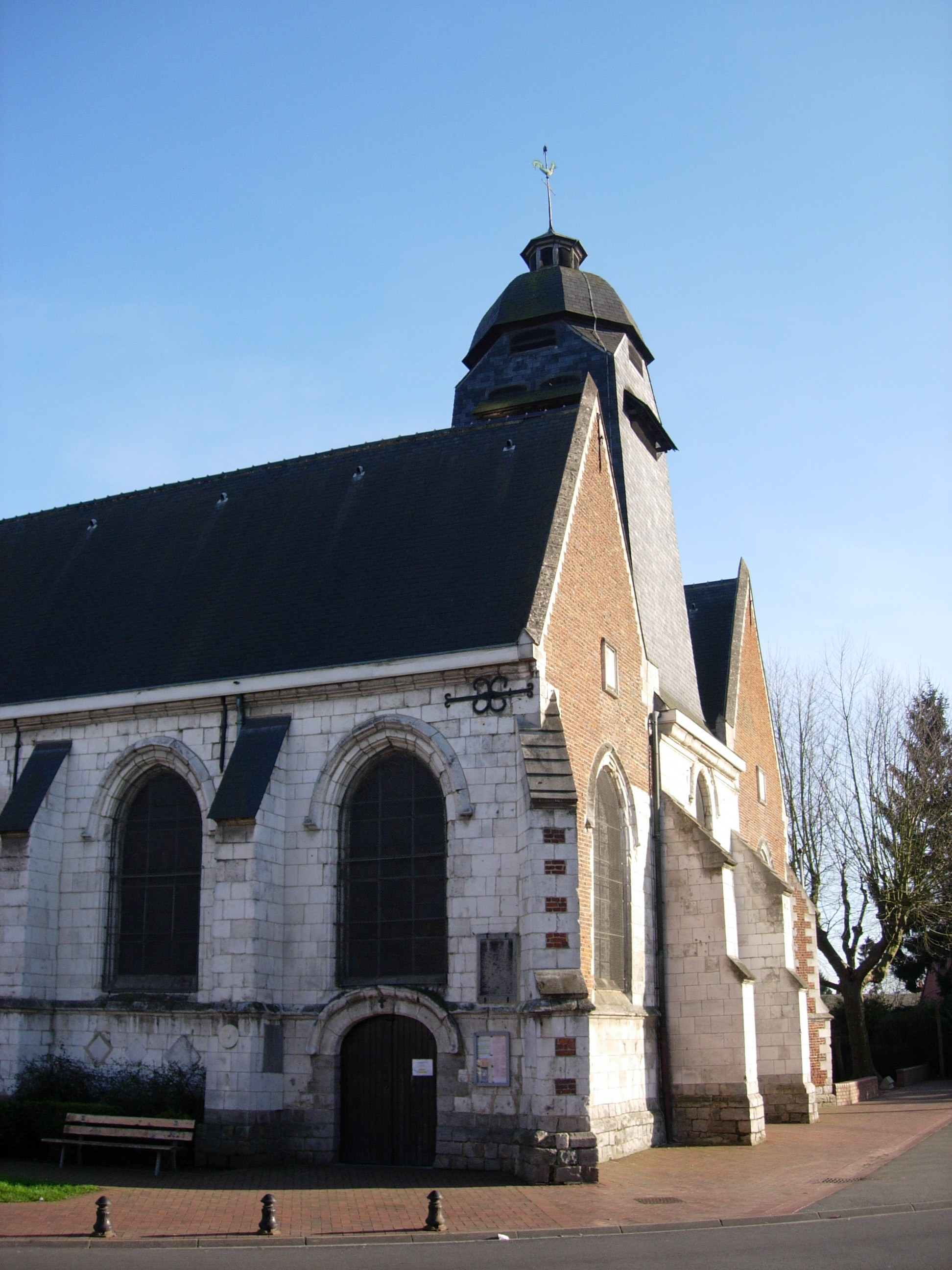
- The church in Sequedin

- Coat of arms
- Location of Sequedin
- Location within France Location within Hauts-de-France
- Coordinates: 50°37′38″N 2°59′09″E
- Country: France
- Region: Hauts-de-France
- Department: Nord
- Arrondissement: Lille
- Canton: Lille-6
- Intercommunality: Métropole Européenne de Lille

Government
  - Mayor (2020–2026): Christian Lewille
- Area^{1}: 3.93 km^{2} (1.52 sq mi)
- Elevation: 22 m (72 ft)
- Population (2023): 4,675
  - Density: 1,190/km^{2} (3,080/sq mi)
- Time zone: UTC+01:00 (CET)
  - Summer (DST): UTC+02:00 (CEST)
- INSEE/Postal code: 59566 /59320
- ^{1} French Land Register data, which excludes lakes, ponds, glaciers > 1 km^{2} (0.386 sq mi or 247 acres) and river estuaries.

Sequedin (French pronunciation: [səkdɛ̃]) is a commune in the Nord department in northern France.

== Population ==
Historical population
Year	Pop.	±% p.a.
1968	2,716	—
1975	2,966	+1.27%
1982	3,384	+1.90%
1990	3,340	−0.16%
1999	3,627	+0.92%
2007	4,437	+2.55%
2012	4,314	−0.56%
2017	4,712	+1.78%
2023	4,675	−0.13%
Source: INSEE

== Heraldry ==
Arms of Sequedin	The arms of Sequedin are blazoned : Per pale azure and Or, the name 'Sequedin' between two barrulets counterchanged argent and sable.

== Twin towns ==
Sequedin is twinned with Maureilhan (Hérault, southern France) since 1989.

== See also ==
- Communes of the Nord department
