= Rœux station =

Railway station in Rœux, France

Rœux
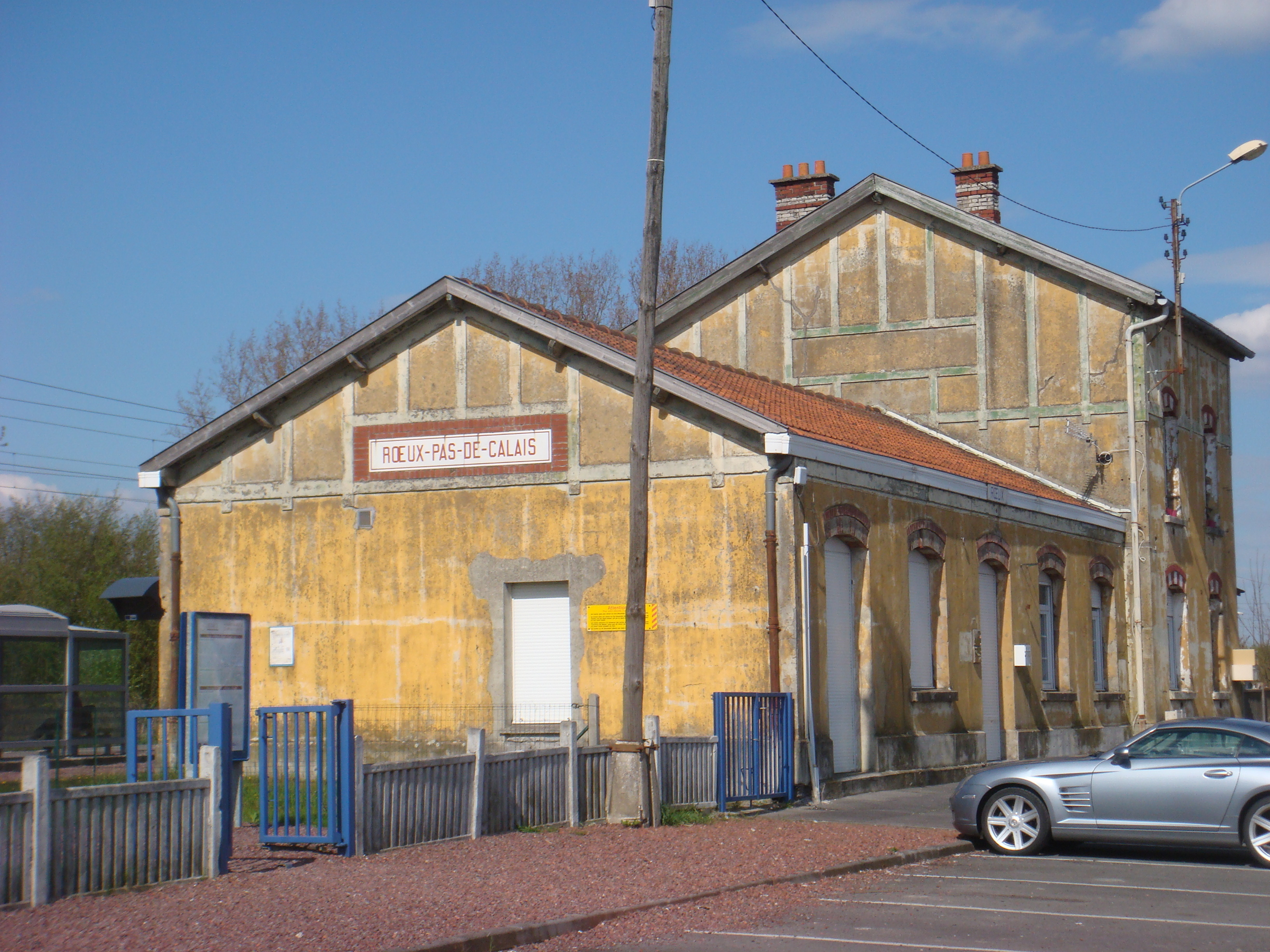

General information
- Location: Rue de la Gare; 62118 Rœux; Pas-de-Calais, France
- Coordinates: 50°18′12″N 2°53′42″E
- Elevation: 60 m (200 ft)
- Owner: SNCF
- Operator: SNCF
- Line: Paris–Lille railway
- Platforms: 2
- Tracks: 2

Other information
- Station code: 87342089

History
- Opened: 1 April 1846

Passengers
- 2018: 21 018

Services
Preceding station	TER Hauts-de-France	Following station
Biache-Saint-Vaast towards Douai	Proxi P44	Arras Terminus
Location

Rœux station (French: Gare de Rœux) is a railway station serving the commune of Rœux, Pas-de-Calais department of France. It is located on the Paris-Lille railway at kilometric point (KP) 200.760.

The station is owned and operated by SNCF and served by TER Hauts-de-France trains.

== History ==
In 2018 SNCF estimated that the station served 21,018 customers, down from previous years.
