= Erquinghem-le-Sec =

- Commune
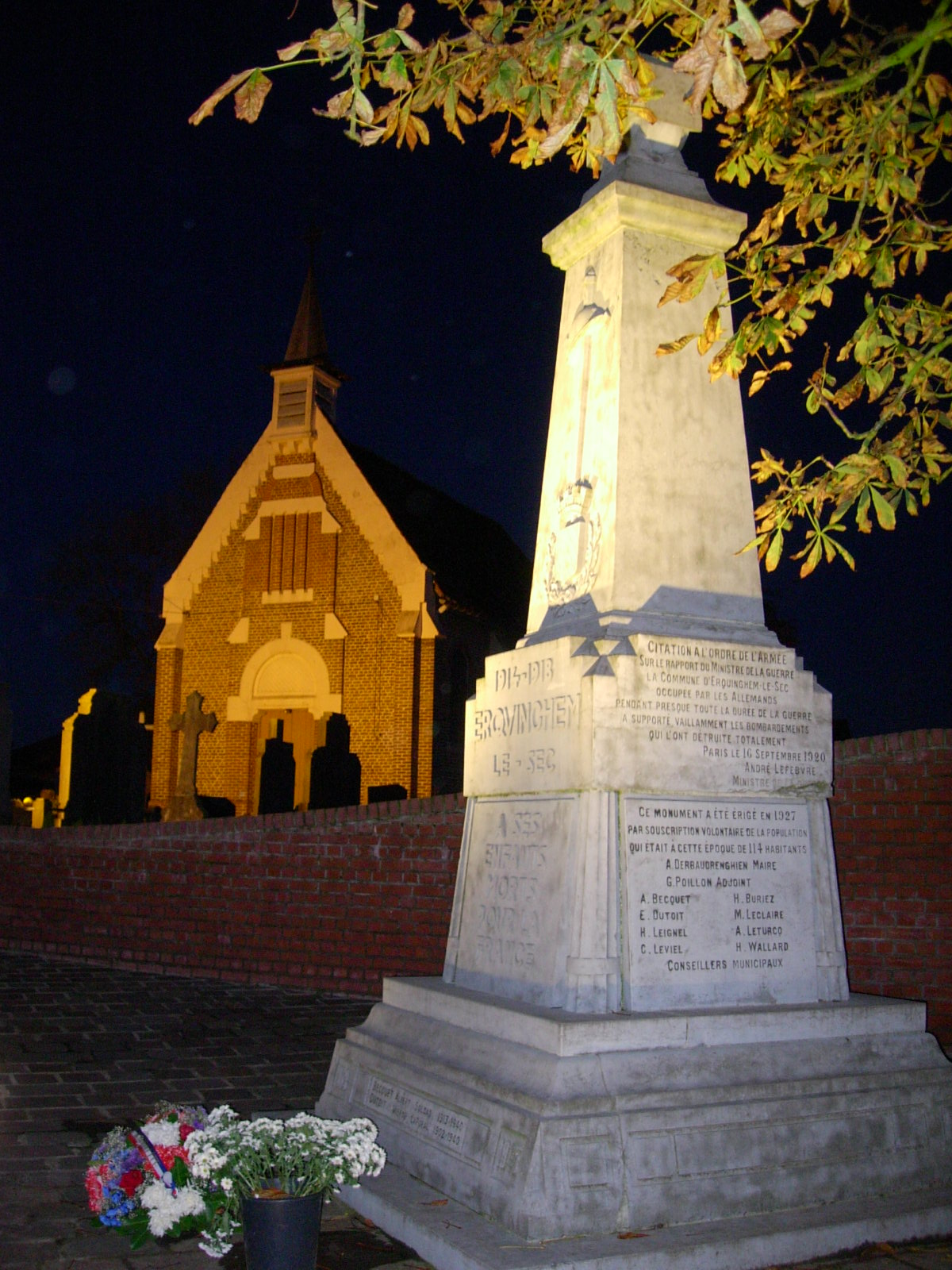
- The church and war memorial in Erquinghem-le-Sec

- Coat of arms
- Location of Erquinghem-le-Sec
- Location within France Location within Hauts-de-France
- Coordinates: 50°36′49″N 2°55′57″E
- Country: France
- Region: Hauts-de-France
- Department: Nord
- Arrondissement: Lille
- Canton: Lille-6
- Intercommunality: Métropole Européenne de Lille

Government
  - Mayor (2020–2026): Éric Pauron
- Area^{1}: 1.75 km^{2} (0.68 sq mi)
- Elevation: 38 m (125 ft)
- Highest elevation: 42 m (138 ft)
- Lowest elevation: 23 m (75 ft)
- Population (2023): 620
  - Density: 350/km^{2} (920/sq mi)
- Time zone: UTC+01:00 (CET)
  - Summer (DST): UTC+02:00 (CEST)
- INSEE/Postal code: 59201 /59320
- ^{1} French Land Register data, which excludes lakes, ponds, glaciers > 1 km^{2} (0.386 sq mi or 247 acres) and river estuaries.

Erquinghem-le-Sec (French pronunciation: [ɛʁkɛ̃ɡɛm lə sɛk]; Dutch: Erkegem) is a commune in the Nord department in northern France.

== Heraldry ==
Arms of Erquinghem-le-Sec	The arms of Erquinghem-le-Sec are blazoned : Or, 5 bendlets, a canton gules.

== See also ==
- Communes of the Nord department
