= European route E42 =

Road in trans-European E-road network

E42

Route information
- Length: 680 km (420 mi)

Major junctions
- West end: Dunkerque, France
- East end: Aschaffenburg, Germany

Location
- Countries: France; Belgium; Germany

Highway system
- International E-road network; A Class; B Class

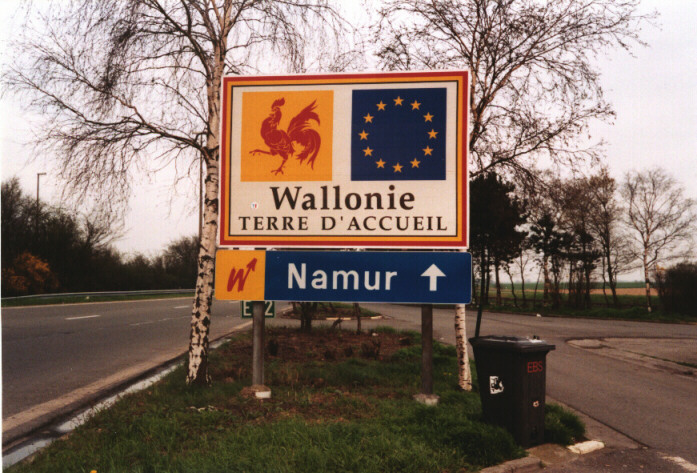
Road sign at the border between Wallonia and France

European route E42 is a road in Europe and a part of the United Nations International E-road network. It connects Dunkerque, a major ferry and container port at the northern end of the French coast with Aschaffenburg on the north western tip of Bavaria. Along the way it also passes through Wallonia in Belgium and the German Länder of Rhineland-Palatinate and Hessen. The full length of the route is approximately 680 kilometers (420 mi).

== Language challenge ==
The western section of the route runs close to the Franco-Dutch language border. As a consequence, traffic signs might use Dutch exonyms for French or Walloon cities, and French exonyms for Dutch-speaking places. When a city lies in France, both names will be displayed in Flanders (e.g. Rijsel will be followed by Lille in italics).

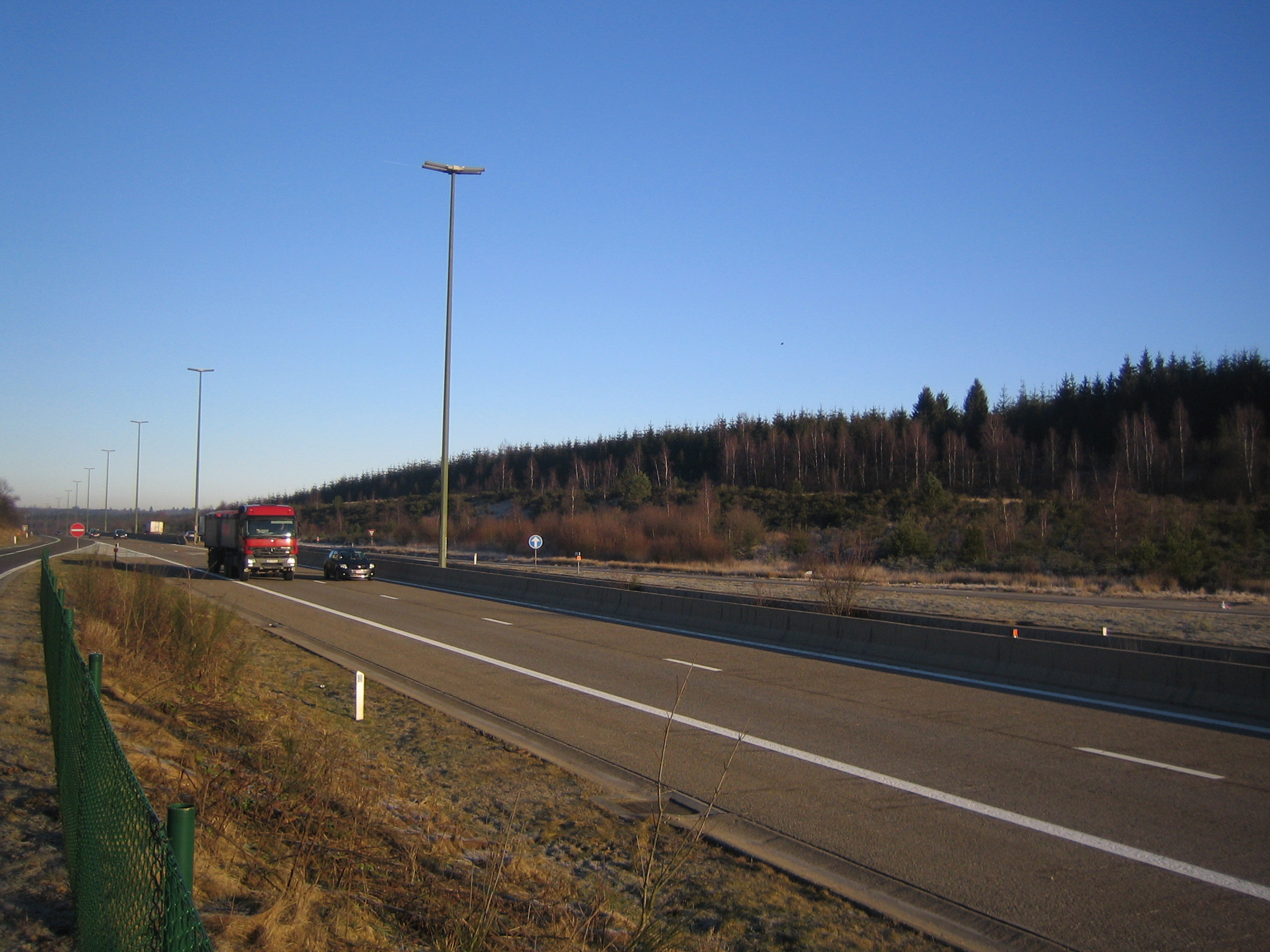
The most easterly of the Belgian stretches of the E42 doubles with the recently upgraded Autoroute A27

== Route ==
=== France ===
The western end between Dunkerque and Lille follows a four lane dual carriageway toll free highway. Much of this has recently been resurfaced, but parts remain of subautoroute standard in terms of such details as junction lay-out and speed limits. Lille itself is at the centre of a major industrial area and is the meeting point of major routes. The passage of the E42 along the urban highway is marked by several sharp bends and, especially for westbound traffic, unavoidable lane changes as well as speed cameras. Delays during peak commuting times are frequent.

=== Belgium ===
The route follows no fewer than six different autoroutes in succession during its passage through southern Belgium (Wallonia), linking all its major cities, from the provincial capital Mons, to Charleroi and Namur, along with the major commercial and university city of Liège and its important cargo airport further to the east. The most easterly portion within Belgium was fully upgraded to autoroute standard only with the completion of the A27 at the end of the 20th century: before that happened the main road included (subject to diversions on race days) a brief stretch that used the Formula One racing circuit at Spa. The final kilometers before the German frontier include towns and villages transferred from Germany to Belgium under the provisions of the 1919 Treaty of Versailles endorsed in 1925 by a referendum process not universally regarded as fair: over three quarters of a century later sign boards showing place names in French and German frequently have the French versions deleted by graffiti artists.

=== Germany ===
The eastern portion of the E42 in Germany follows the BAB 60. Despite considerable progress in recent years, the building of the Autobahn was delayed during the final decade of the 20th century, and the road in this area is still missing several important doubled road viaducts, so that at various points the road is reduced to a single two lane road. The landscape here is relatively mountainous: a recent development has been the appearance on the surrounding horizons of modern windmill groupings.

== Itinerary ==
E42 Dunkerque - Aschaffenburg
State	National; Road; Number	Section	Junction (national numbering)
..........Department			
59	RN 225	Dunkerque - Bergues	RN 225; RN 225 20; RN 225 19; RN 225 18; RN 225 17; RN 225 16 Bergues
59	A 25	Bergues - Lille (Rijsel)	A 25 15 Herzeele; A 25 14 Winnezeele, Hondschoote; A 25 St Eloi et St Laurent; A 25 13 Steenvoorde; A 25 12 Bailleul; A 25 11 Hazebrouck; A 25 10 Bailleul; A 25 9 Nieppe; A 25 8 Armentières; A 25 7 Béthune; A 25 6 Englos; A 25 5 Lille centre A 25 4 Lille-Faubourg de Béthune; A 25 3 Lille-Wazemmes; A 25 2 Lille-Moulins; A 25 1
59	A 27	Lille (Rijsel) - Baisieux	A 27 1 Ronchin; A 27 2 Lesquin; A 27; A 27 3 Baisieux
..........Province			
Hainaut	A 8	Baisieux - Tournai (Doornik)	A 8 35 Blandain; A 8 Marquain; A 8 A 8 34 Tournai (Doornik) West; A 8 33 Tournai (Doornik) North; A 8 Tournai (Doornik)
Hainaut	A 16	Tournai (Doornik) - Saint-Ghislain	A 16 32 Tournai (Doornik) East; A 16 31 Antoing; A 16 30 Maubray; A 16 29 Péruwelz; A 16 28 Blaton; A 16 27 Bernissart; A 16 26 Pommerœul; A 16 Hautrage
Hainaut	A 7	Saint-Ghislain - La Louvière	A 7 A 7 25 Saint-Ghislain; A 7 24 Mons (Bergen); A 7 23 Nimy, Maisières; A 7 22 Obourg; A 7 A 7 21a Thieu; A 7 21 Le Rœulx; A 7 Houdeng-Goegnies
Hainaut Namur Liège	A 15	La Louvière - Liège (Luik, Lüttich)	A 15 20 Houdeng; A 15 Bois-d'Haine; A 15 19 Manage; A 15 18 Chapelle-lez-Herlaimont; A 15 Gouy; A 15 17 Courcelles; A 15 Thiméon; A 15 16 Gosselies north A 15 15 Fleurus; A 15 14 Sambreville; A 15; A 15 13 Spy; A 15 12 Namur west A 15; A 15 10a Fernelmont; A 15 10 Hingeon; A 15 9 Andenne; A 15 8 Huy-Couthuin; A 15 7 Huy-Fumal; A 15 6 Villers-le-Bouillet; A 15; A 15 5 Saint-Georges; A 15 4 Flémalle; A 15 3 Liège airport A 15; A 15
Liège	A 3	Liège (Luik, Lüttich) - Battice	E25
Liège	A 27	Battice - Sankt-Vith	
Land/District			
BIT; WIL	A 60	Steinebrück (frontier) - Wittlich	
WIL	A 1	Wittlich	
WIL; SIM	B 50	Wittlich - Rheinböllen	
SIM; KH; MZ	A 61	Rheinböllen - Bingen	
MZ; GG	A 60	Bingen - Rüsselsheim	
GG	A 67	Rüsselsheim - Mönchhof	
GG; F OF	A 3	Mönchhof - Aschaffenburg	
