= WC Loc =

- Type: Subsidiary
- Industry: Rental of mobile sanitation units
- Founded: 1992
- Founder: Paul Dupire
- Headquarters: Englos, France
- Key people: Hervé Montagne (President); François Deléglise (Managing Director, France)
- Parent: Enygea
- Website: www.wcloc.com

WC Loc is a French company specializing in the rental and maintenance of mobile toilets. Founded in 1992 and headquartered in Englos, Hauts-de-France, it is the main subsidiary of the Enygea Group.

== History ==
WC Loc was founded in 1992 by Paul Dupire in northern France and specializes in the rental of mobile sanitation units for construction sites, events, and local authorities. In the early 2000s, the company expanded into Brittany, Île-de-France and Auvergne. In 2007, WC Loc was acquired by Hervé Montagne. One year later, the company acquired PSV, which was later renamed Happee Services.

In January 2018, WC Loc acquired the business assets of Pelicab, the French subsidiary of the ADCO Group. In May 2019, WC Loc expanded into Belgium through the acquisition of Cathy Cabine, a Belgian company based in Amay, and the sanitation activity of the rental company Locasix. In 2021, through partnerships with the brands madamePee and Lapee, WC Loc began offering female urinals. In July 2022, WC Loc announced the acquisition of Axe Environnement. In June 2023, the company acquired the Italian company Toi Toi Italia.

In February 2024, during the International Agricultural Show, Toopi Organics collected urine for conversion into an agricultural biostimulant, in partnership with WC Loc and its subsidiary Happee Services.

In 2024, the company acquired Sologne SanitLoc, WC+ IDF and Alpes SaniLoc. In February 2025, WC Nord, a mobile toilet rental company based in Larouillies, was acquired by WC Loc from its founder, Pierre-Alexandre Jacquinet. In October 2025, WC Loc, through its subsidiary WC Loc Méditerranée, acquired WC+ Sud.

== Activities ==
WC Loc is the main brand of the Enygea Group and specializes in the rental of mobile sanitation units. The company operates in France and other European countries, including Belgium, Spain, Portugal, Italy and Luxembourg. Its activities primarily serve construction sites, including infrastructure projects such as railways, tramways, motorways and tunnels. WC Loc provides also sanitation services at events including the Tour de France, Solidays, Main Square Festival, Hellfest, Rock en Seine, Tomorrowland and the Printemps de Bourges.
