= Biache-Saint-Vaast station =

Railway station

Coordinates: 50°18′59″N 2°56′29″E

Biache-Saint-Vaast
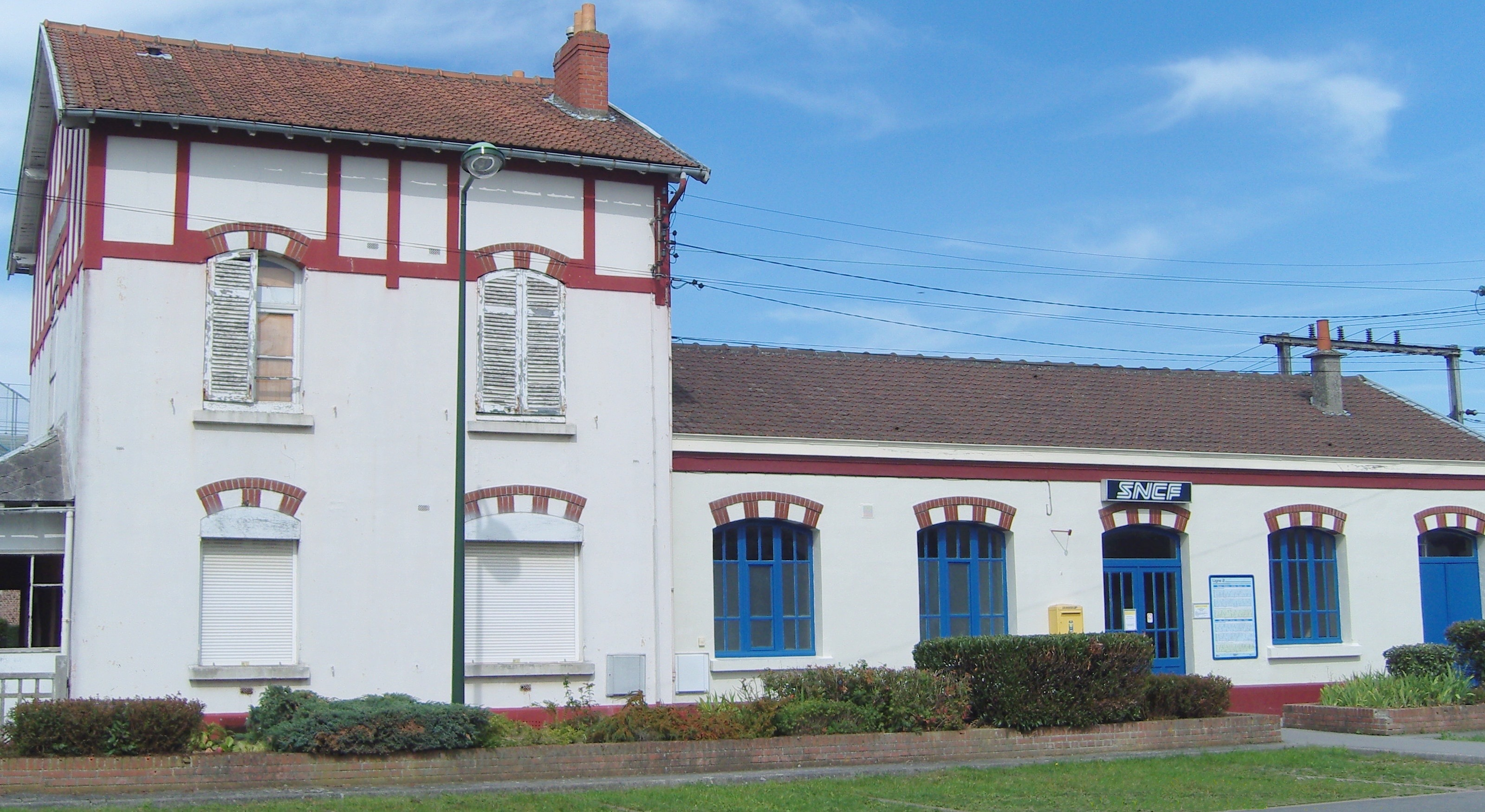
- SNCF passenger building and entrance to the station

General information
- Location: Place de la Gare; 62118 Biache-Saint-Vaast; Pas-de-Calais, France
- Elevation: 57 m (187 ft)
- Owner: SNCF
- Operator: SNCF
- Line: Paris-Lille railway
- Distance: 204.333 km
- Platforms: 2
- Tracks: 2 (+ service tracks)

Other information
- Station code: 87342097

Passengers
- 2019: 61,097

Services
Preceding station	TER Hauts-de-France	Following station
Vitry-en-Artois towards Douai	Proxi P44	Rœux towards Arras
Location

Biache-Saint-Vaast station (French: Gare de Biache-Saint-Vaast) is a railway station serving the commune of Biache-Saint-Vaast, Pas-de-Calais department of France. It is located at kilometric point (KP) 204.333 on the Paris-Lille railway.

The station is owned and operated by the SNCF and served by TER Hauts-de-France trains.

== History ==
In 2019, the SNCF estimated that 61,097 passengers traveled through the station.

== Services ==
As of 2021, the station is served by TER Hauts-de-France trains between Arras and Douai.
