= Hellemmes-Lille =

- Associated commune of Lille
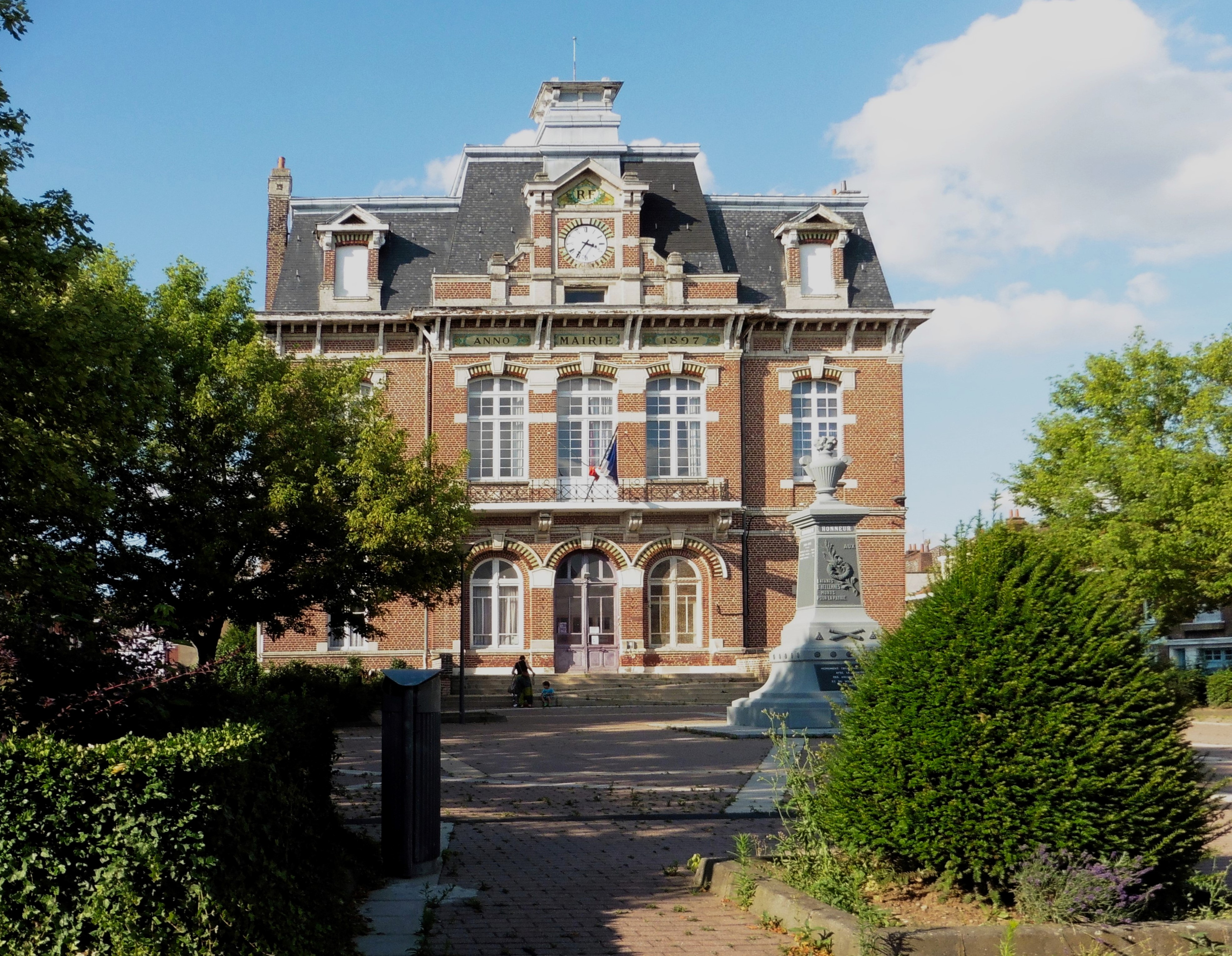
- Hellemmes-Lille Town Hall
- Location of Hellemmes-Lille
- Location within France Location within Hauts-de-France
- Coordinates: 50°37′N 3°07′E
- Country: France
- Region: Hauts-de-France
- Department: Nord
- Arrondissement: Lille
- Canton: Lille-3
- Commune: Lille
- Area^{1}: 3.34 km^{2} (1.29 sq mi)
- Population (2022): 18,190
  - Density: 5,450/km^{2} (14,100/sq mi)
- Time zone: UTC+01:00 (CET)
  - Summer (DST): UTC+02:00 (CEST)
- Postal code: 59260
- ^{1} French Land Register data, which excludes lakes, ponds, glaciers > 1 km^{2} (0.386 sq mi or 247 acres) and river estuaries.

Hellemmes (French pronunciation: [ɛlɛm lil]; Dutch: Hellem) is a former commune in the Nord department in northern France. It is an associated part of Lille since 1977.

== Heraldry ==
Arms of Hellemmes	The arms of Hellemmes are blazoned : Vair simple.

== See also ==
- Communes of the Nord department
