= Biache-Saint-Vaast =

- Commune
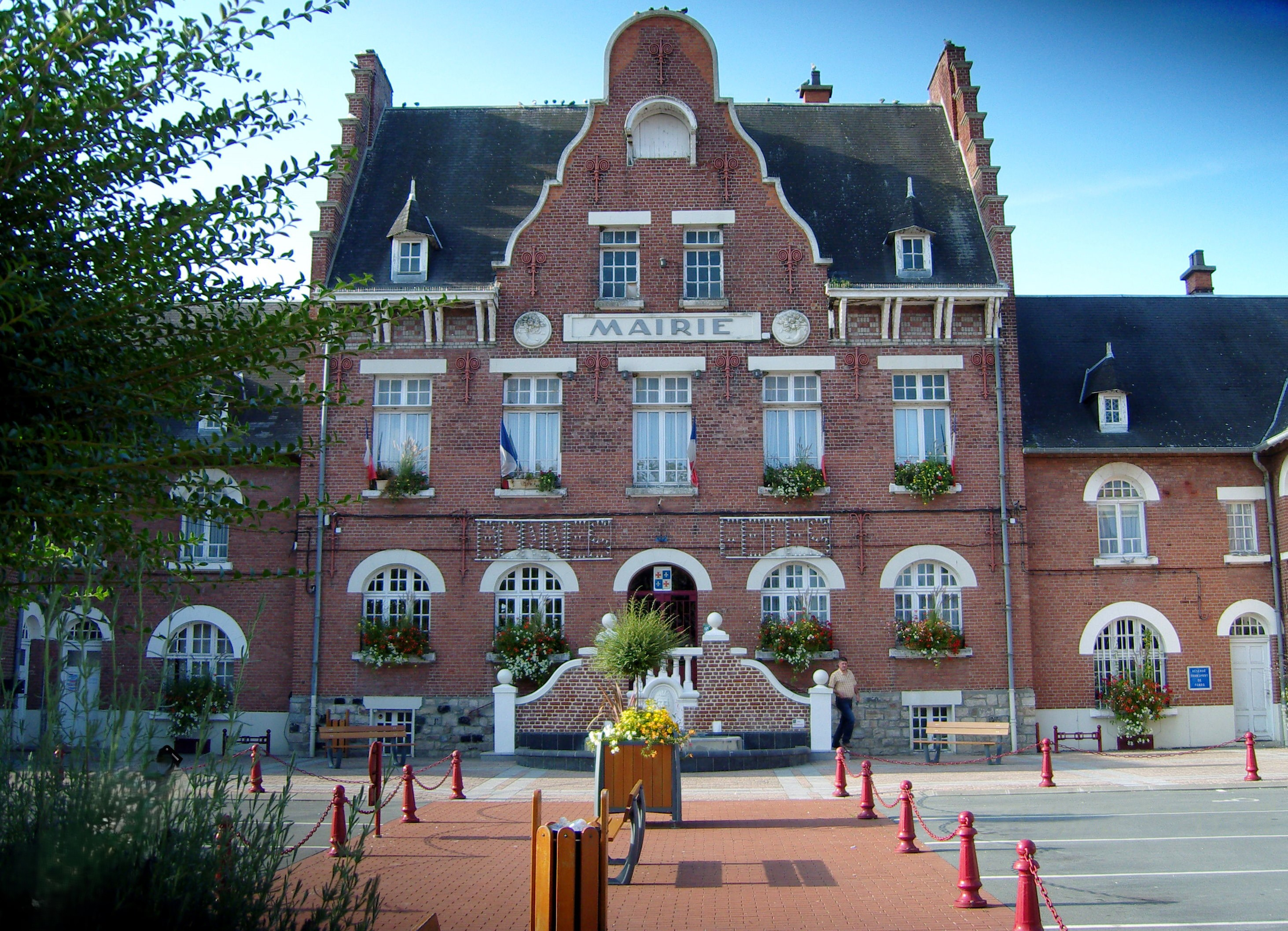
- The town hall of Biache-Saint-Vaast

- Coat of arms
- Location of Biache-Saint-Vaast
- Location within France Location within Hauts-de-France
- Coordinates: 50°18′45″N 2°56′42″E
- Country: France
- Region: Hauts-de-France
- Department: Pas-de-Calais
- Arrondissement: Arras
- Canton: Brebières
- Intercommunality: CC Osartis Marquion

Government
  - Mayor (2020–2026): Hervé Naglik
- Area^{1}: 9.29 km^{2} (3.59 sq mi)
- Elevation: 56 m (184 ft)
- Highest elevation: 70 m (230 ft)
- Lowest elevation: 42 m (138 ft)
- Population (2023): 4,568
  - Density: 492/km^{2} (1,270/sq mi)
- Time zone: UTC+01:00 (CET)
  - Summer (DST): UTC+02:00 (CEST)
- INSEE/Postal code: 62128 /62118
- ^{1} French Land Register data, which excludes lakes, ponds, glaciers > 1 km^{2} (0.386 sq mi or 247 acres) and river estuaries.

Biache-Saint-Vaast is a commune in the Pas-de-Calais department in the Hauts-de-France region in northern France.

== Geography ==
A small farming and light industrial town located 8 miles (13 km) east of Arras, on the banks of the Scarpe river, at the junction of the D42, D43 and D46 roads. The A26 autoroute passes by just yards from the commune. Biache-Saint-Vaast station has rail connections to Arras and Douai.

== Prehistory ==
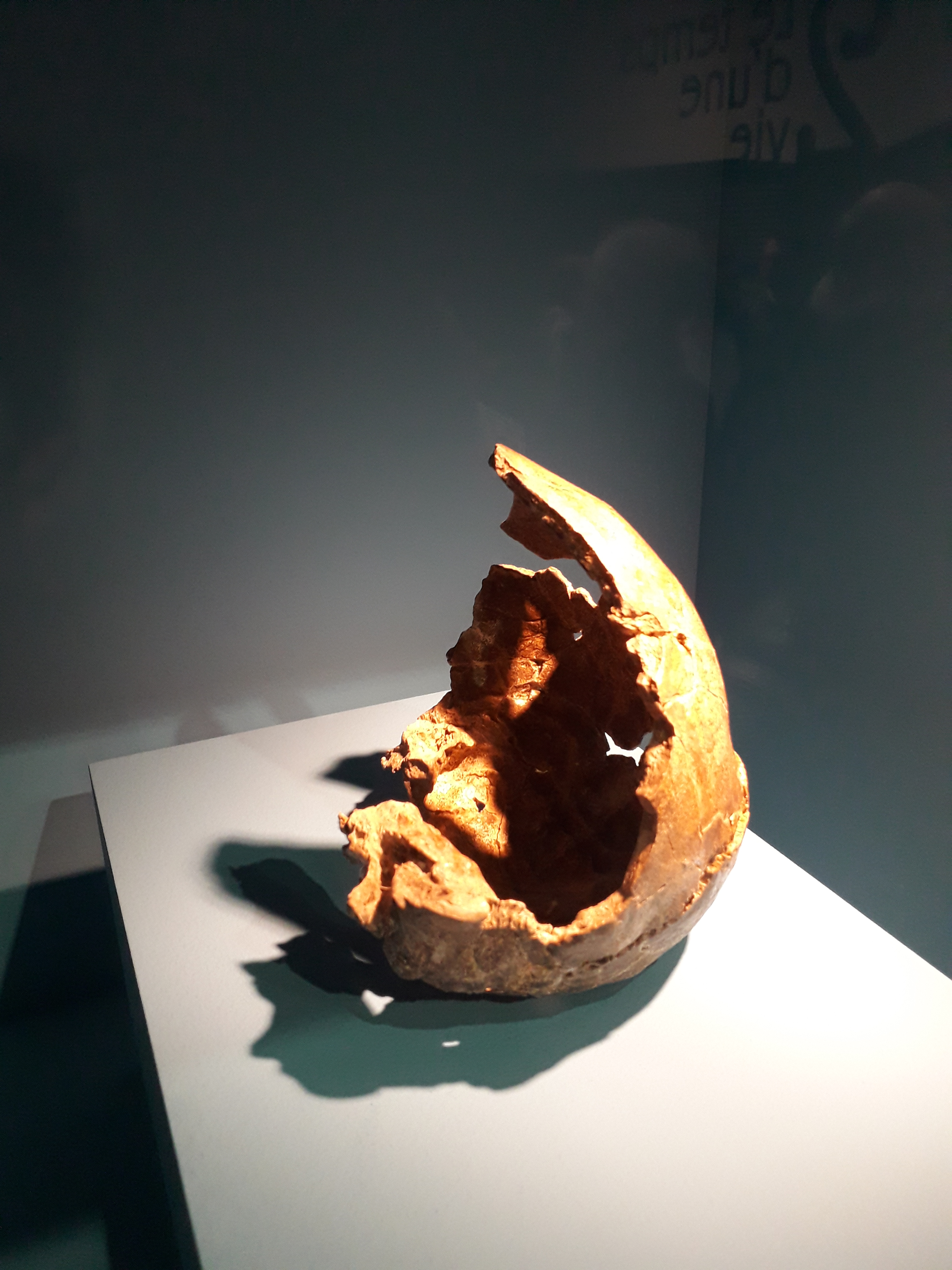
Partial skull of a Neanderthal found at Biache-Saint-Vaast

Biache-Saint-Vaast is well-known for an eponymous Middle Palaeolithic archaeological site immediately to the south of the town on the left bank of the Scarpe River, produced by early Neanderthals dating to around 240,000 years ago (MIS 7) showing evidence for the use of fire and the butchery of aurochs, narrow-nosed rhinoceros, and brown bear. Bones of primitive Neanderthals have also been recovered from the site.

== Population ==
Historical population
Year	Pop.	±% p.a.
1968	3,860	—
1975	4,224	+1.30%
1982	4,032	−0.66%
1990	3,981	−0.16%
1999	3,923	−0.16%
2007	3,872	−0.16%
2012	3,985	+0.58%
2017	4,083	+0.49%
2023	4,568	+1.89%
Source: INSEE

== Sights ==
- The church of St. Pierre, rebuilt, as was much of the town, after the ravages of World War I.
- The war memorials.
- An archaeological site of a Stone Age settlement of the Mousterian culture, with finds showing signs of the Levallois technique.

== Personalities ==
- Charles Delestraint, general and member of the French Resistance

== See also ==
- Communes of the Pas-de-Calais department
