= Mons-en-Barœul =

- Commune
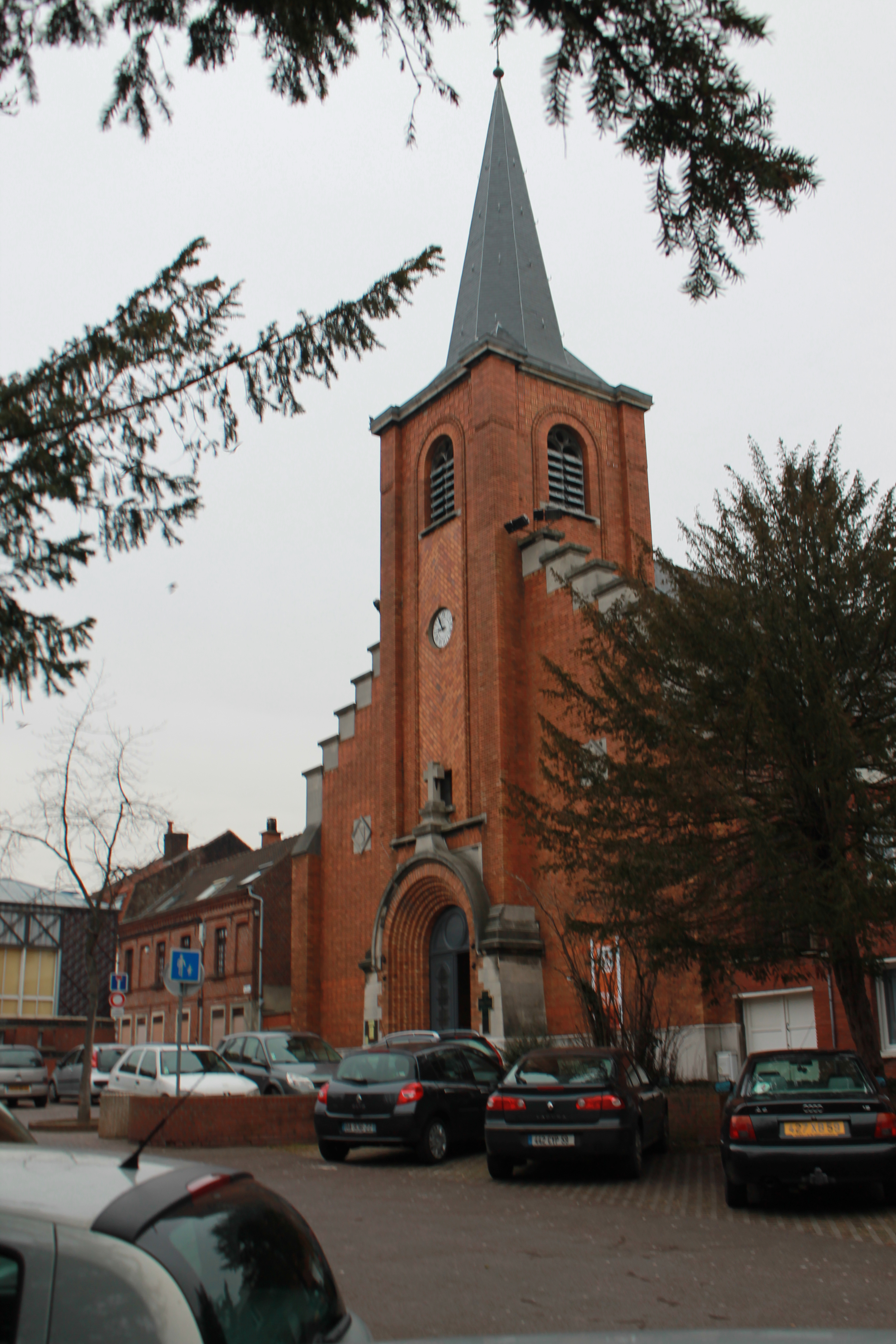
- The church in Mons-en-Barœul

- Coat of arms
- Location of Mons-en-Barœul
- Location within France Location within Hauts-de-France
- Coordinates: 50°38′13″N 3°06′37″E
- Country: France
- Region: Hauts-de-France
- Department: Nord
- Arrondissement: Lille
- Canton: Lille-3
- Intercommunality: Métropole Européenne de Lille

Government
  - Mayor (2020–2026): Rudy Elegeest
- Area^{1}: 2.88 km^{2} (1.11 sq mi)
- Elevation: 31 m (102 ft)
- Highest elevation: 47 m (154 ft)
- Lowest elevation: 22 m (72 ft)
- Population (2023): 21,105
  - Density: 7,330/km^{2} (19,000/sq mi)
- Time zone: UTC+01:00 (CET)
  - Summer (DST): UTC+02:00 (CEST)
- INSEE/Postal code: 59410 /59370
- ^{1} French Land Register data, which excludes lakes, ponds, glaciers > 1 km^{2} (0.386 sq mi or 247 acres) and river estuaries.

Mons-en-Barœul (French pronunciation: [mɔ̃s ɑ̃ baʁœl]) is a commune in the Nord department in northern France.

It is a suburb of the city of Lille, and is adjacent to it on the northeast. The name Mons-en-Barœul means mount in the Barœul, the city is built on a slight hill; the Barœul was a former territory (see also Marcq-en-Barœul). Before the sixteenth century, little is known of this county, which was only rural. Plans of the eighteenth century show Mons-en-Barœul as a small village without a church, with farms scattered along the high road from Lille to Roubaix. It is a former dependency of Fives, a district which is now part of Lille.

== Heraldry ==
Arms of Mons-en-Barœul	The arms of Mons-en-Barœul are blazoned : Or, a bend sable. (Flesquières, Gonnelieu, Mons-en-Barœul and Viesly use the same arms.)

== History ==
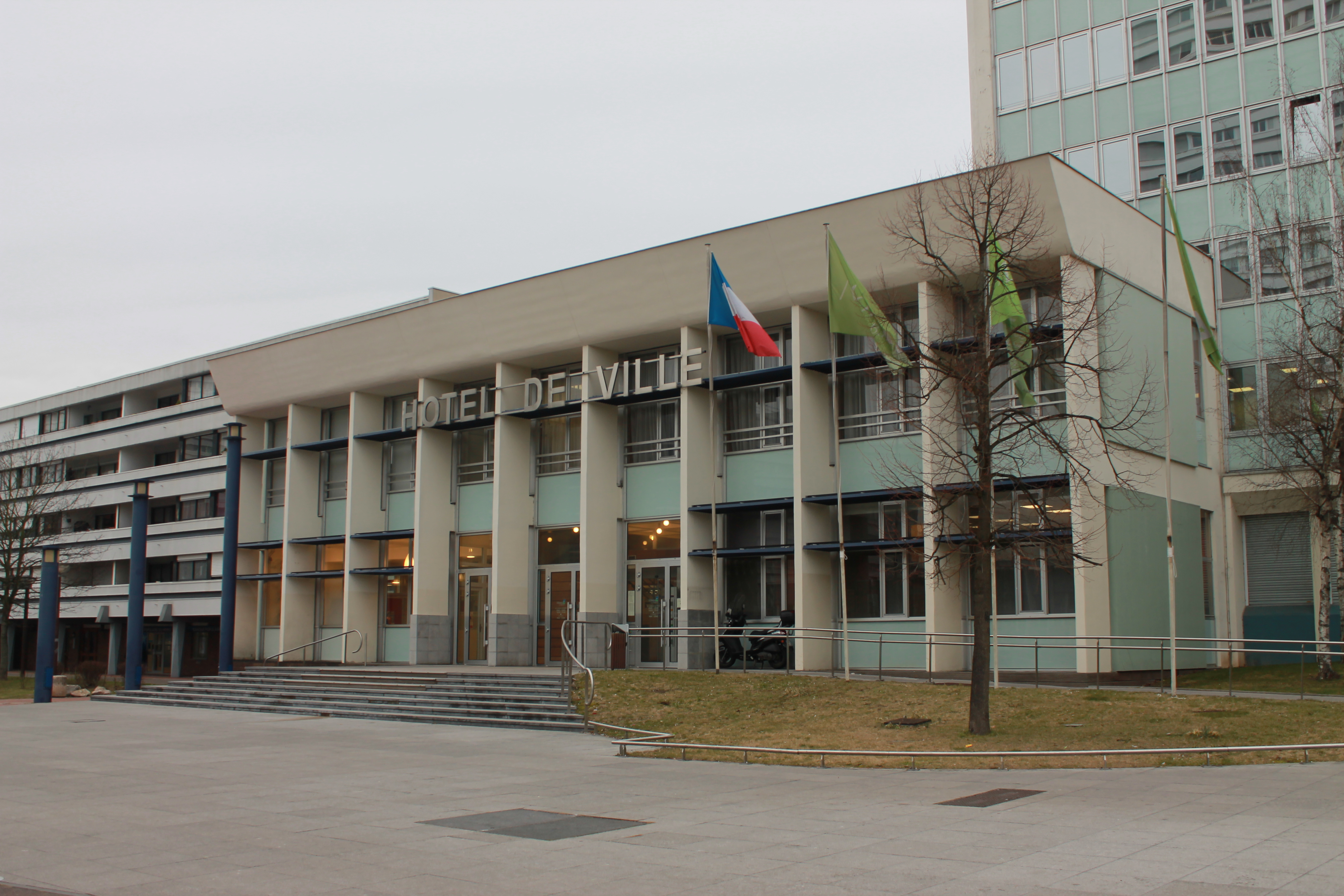
The Hôtel de Ville

The Hôtel de Ville was completed in 1977.

== Population ==
Historical population

Year	Pop.	±% p.a.
1793	705	—
1800	671	−0.70%
1806	770	+2.32%
1821	738	−0.28%
1831	803	+0.85%
1836	807	+0.10%
1841	889	+1.95%
1846	1,043	+3.25%
1851	1,120	+1.43%
1856	1,319	+3.32%
1861	1,557	+3.37%
1866	1,868	+3.71%
1872	2,168	+2.51%
1876	2,383	+2.39%
1881	2,389	+0.05%
1886	2,891	+3.89%
1891	2,832	−0.41%
1896	3,575	+4.77%
1901	4,226	+3.40%

Year	Pop.	±% p.a.
1906	5,059	+3.66%
1911	5,949	+3.29%
1921	6,792	+1.33%
1926	7,227	+1.25%
1931	8,096	+2.30%
1936	8,705	+1.46%
1946	9,030	+0.37%
1954	9,125	+0.13%
1962	11,531	+2.97%
1968	14,113	+3.42%
1975	28,070	+10.32%
1982	26,638	−0.75%
1990	23,578	−1.51%
1999	23,017	−0.27%
2007	22,664	−0.19%
2012	21,272	−1.26%
2017	20,782	−0.47%
2023	21,105	+0.26%

Source: EHESS and INSEE (1968–2023)

== Notable people ==
- Michel Butor, poet and novelist, was born in Mons-en-Barœul.

== See also ==
- Communes of the Nord department
