= Nieppe =

Nieppe Niepkerke
- Commune
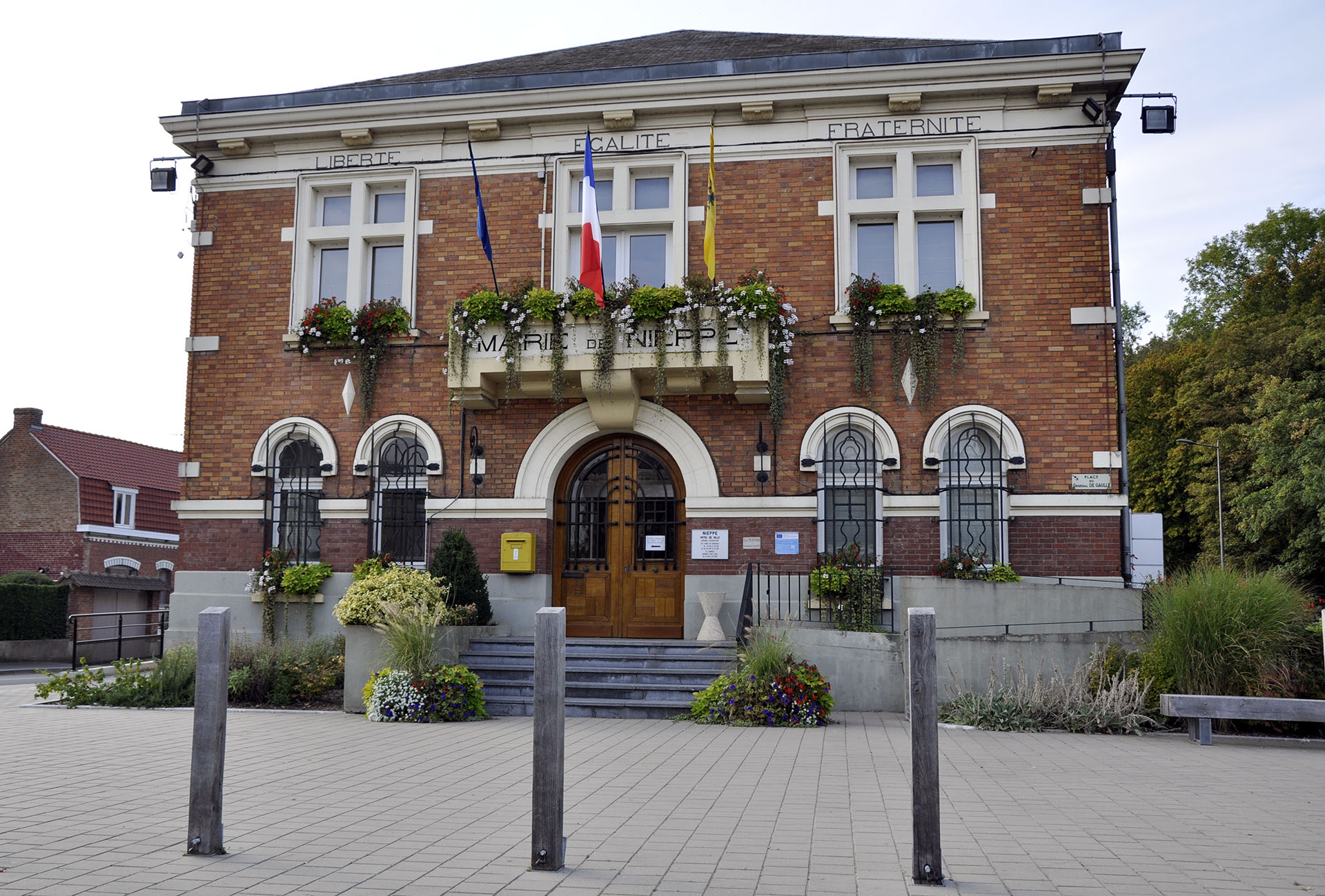
- The town hall in Nieppe

- Coat of arms
- Location of Nieppe
- Location within France Location within Hauts-de-France
- Coordinates: 50°42′14″N 2°50′23″E
- Country: France
- Region: Hauts-de-France
- Department: Nord
- Arrondissement: Dunkerque
- Canton: Bailleul
- Intercommunality: CA Cœur de Flandre

Government
  - Mayor (2023–2026): Marie Sandra
- Area^{1}: 17.3 km^{2} (6.7 sq mi)
- Elevation: 16 m (52 ft)
- Highest elevation: 21 m (69 ft)
- Lowest elevation: 12 m (39 ft)
- Population (2023): 7,764
  - Density: 449/km^{2} (1,160/sq mi)
- Demonym: Nieppois(es)
- Time zone: UTC+01:00 (CET)
  - Summer (DST): UTC+02:00 (CEST)
- INSEE/Postal code: 59431 /59850
- ^{1} French Land Register data, which excludes lakes, ponds, glaciers > 1 km^{2} (0.386 sq mi or 247 acres) and river estuaries.

Nieppe (French pronunciation: [njɛp]; Dutch: Niepkerke) is a commune in the Nord department in northern France. It is in the Lys Plain and a portion of it is in the Lys Valley (Leiedal in Dutch).

== Population ==
Historical population
Year	Pop.	±% p.a.
1968	5,341	—
1975	6,903	+3.73%
1982	7,238	+0.68%
1990	7,417	+0.31%
1999	7,470	+0.08%
2007	7,568	+0.16%
2012	7,412	−0.42%
2017	7,476	+0.17%
2023	7,764	+0.63%
Source: INSEE

== Geography ==
It is situated by the Belgian border. It is located close to Armentières, 42 km southeast of Dunkerque (Dunkirk) and is connected by the A25 (15 km) to Lille. It borders the Belgian municipalities Heuvelland and Comines-Warneton.

Nieppe has a railway station served by TER trains from Calais-Ville station and Dunkerque to Lille-Flandres station. Its nearest airports are in Merville (18 km) and Lesquin (24 km)

== Mayors ==
- 1790-1802: Jean-Marc Chieus
- 1802-1837: Constant Watelet de Messange
- 1837-1841: Pierre Portebois
- 1841-1848: Charles Vanmerris
- 1848-1865: Cyrille Delangre-Salembié
- 1865-1870: Edmond Watelet de Messange
- 1870-1871: Félix Gokelaere
- 1871-1875: Hippolyte Delbecque
- 1875-1890: Louis Loridan
- 1890-1898: Hippolyte Delbecque
- 1898-1906: Hector Pollet
- 1906-1939: Henri Vanuxeem
- 1939-1968: Jules Houcke
- 1968-1972: Renée Houcke

== History ==
Nieppe suffered numerous invasions and wars which devastated the area, given its strategic position of the heart of the agricultural area, and being on the strategic axis Lille-Dunkirk via Bailleul and Cassel, today's A25.

On 11 April 1918, during the Battle of the Lys of World War I, Allied troops were driven out of Nieppe. The village was recaptured on 3 September 1918.

=== Heraldry ===
Arms of Nieppe	The arms of Nieppe are blazoned : Quarterly 1&4: Sable, 6 bezants 3,2,1(Or); 2&3: Argent, a chevron between 3 roses gules.

== Points of interests ==
- A local historic museum
- Château de Nieppe - features a treasure legend, its part and a centennial tree
- War cemeteries of the Commonwealth War Graves Commission:
  - Nieppe Communal Cemetery
  - Pont-D'Achelles Military Cemetery
  - Pont-de-Nieppe Communal Cemetery

== People ==
- Line Renaud (born in 1928)
- Jules Houcke

== Other ==
Nieppe features its own football (soccer) club FC Nieppe and its handball club (team). Nieppe also has a library named after Maurice Schumann, its painting and music school and K'Dane (a Nieppe (Nieppoise) dance school). Miss Cantine was created during the Second World War and was recreated and named on 31 March 2007. It features several funny faces on the solidarity of several Nieppois residents. Opened by Jules Houcke, mayor of Nieppe created and alimented a scholar cantine, opened equally for old people of the commune.

== See also ==
- Communes of the Nord department
