= Santes =

- Commune
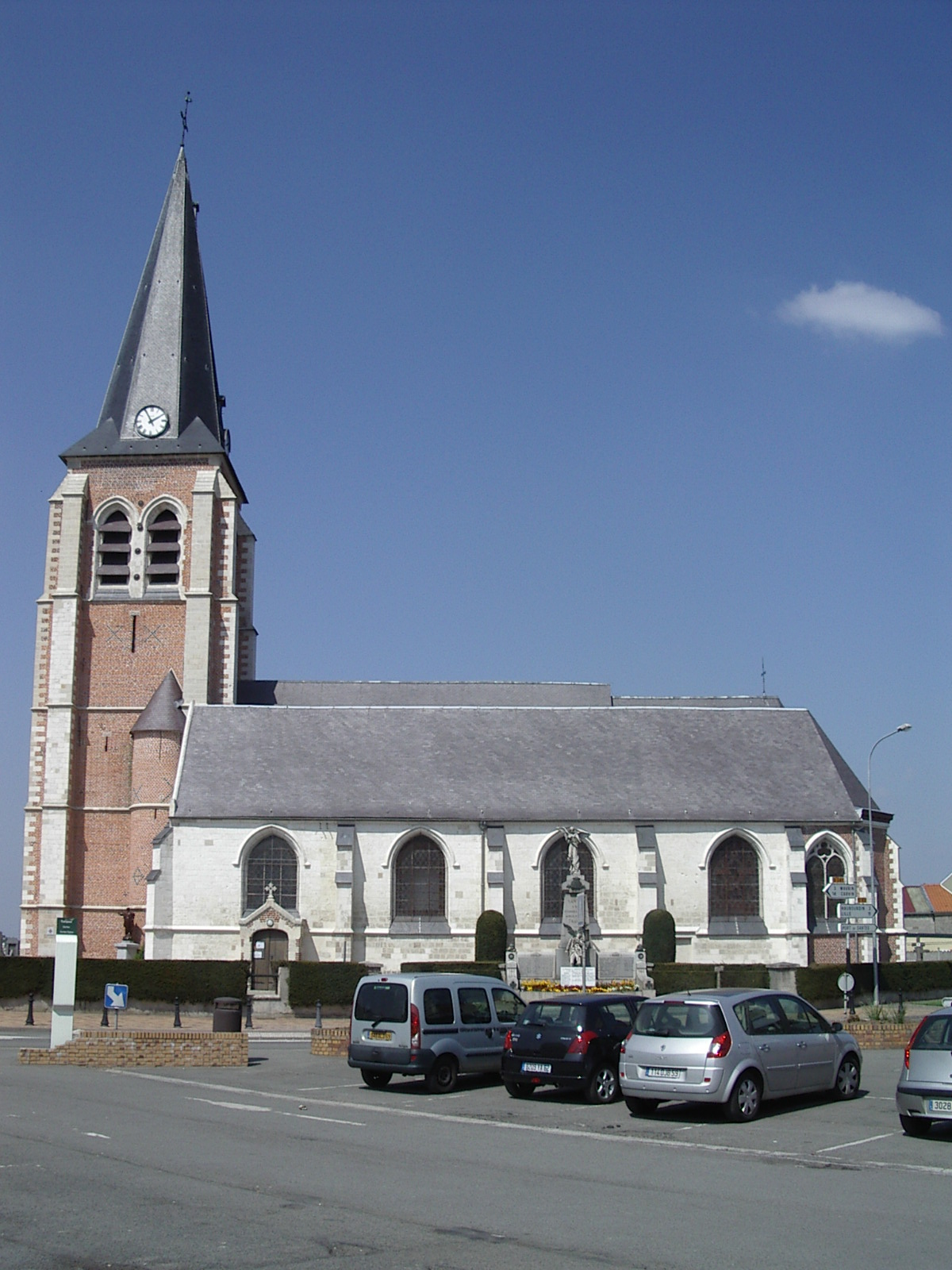
- Church of Saint-Pierre in Santes

- Coat of arms
- Location of Santes
- Location within France Location within Hauts-de-France
- Coordinates: 50°35′38″N 2°57′47″E
- Country: France
- Region: Hauts-de-France
- Department: Nord
- Arrondissement: Lille
- Canton: Lille-6
- Intercommunality: Métropole Européenne de Lille

Government
  - Mayor (2020–2026): Hiazid Belabbes
- Area^{1}: 7.57 km^{2} (2.92 sq mi)
- Elevation: 26 m (85 ft)
- Highest elevation: 29 m (95 ft)
- Lowest elevation: 17 m (56 ft)
- Population (2023): 5,652
  - Density: 747/km^{2} (1,930/sq mi)
- Time zone: UTC+01:00 (CET)
  - Summer (DST): UTC+02:00 (CEST)
- INSEE/Postal code: 59553 /59211
- ^{1} French Land Register data, which excludes lakes, ponds, glaciers > 1 km^{2} (0.386 sq mi or 247 acres) and river estuaries.

Santes (French pronunciation: [sɑ̃t]) is a commune in the Nord department in northern France. It is part of the Métropole Européenne de Lille.

== Population ==
Historical population
Year	Pop.	±% p.a.
1968	3,362	—
1975	3,294	−0.29%
1982	4,735	+5.32%
1990	4,838	+0.27%
1999	4,974	+0.31%
2007	5,036	+0.15%
2012	5,697	+2.50%
2017	5,724	+0.09%
2023	5,652	−0.21%
Source: INSEE

== Heraldry ==
Arms of Santes	The arms of Santes are blazoned : Argent, 3 lions vert, langued gules.

== See also ==
- Communes of the Nord department
