= Baisieux =

- Commune
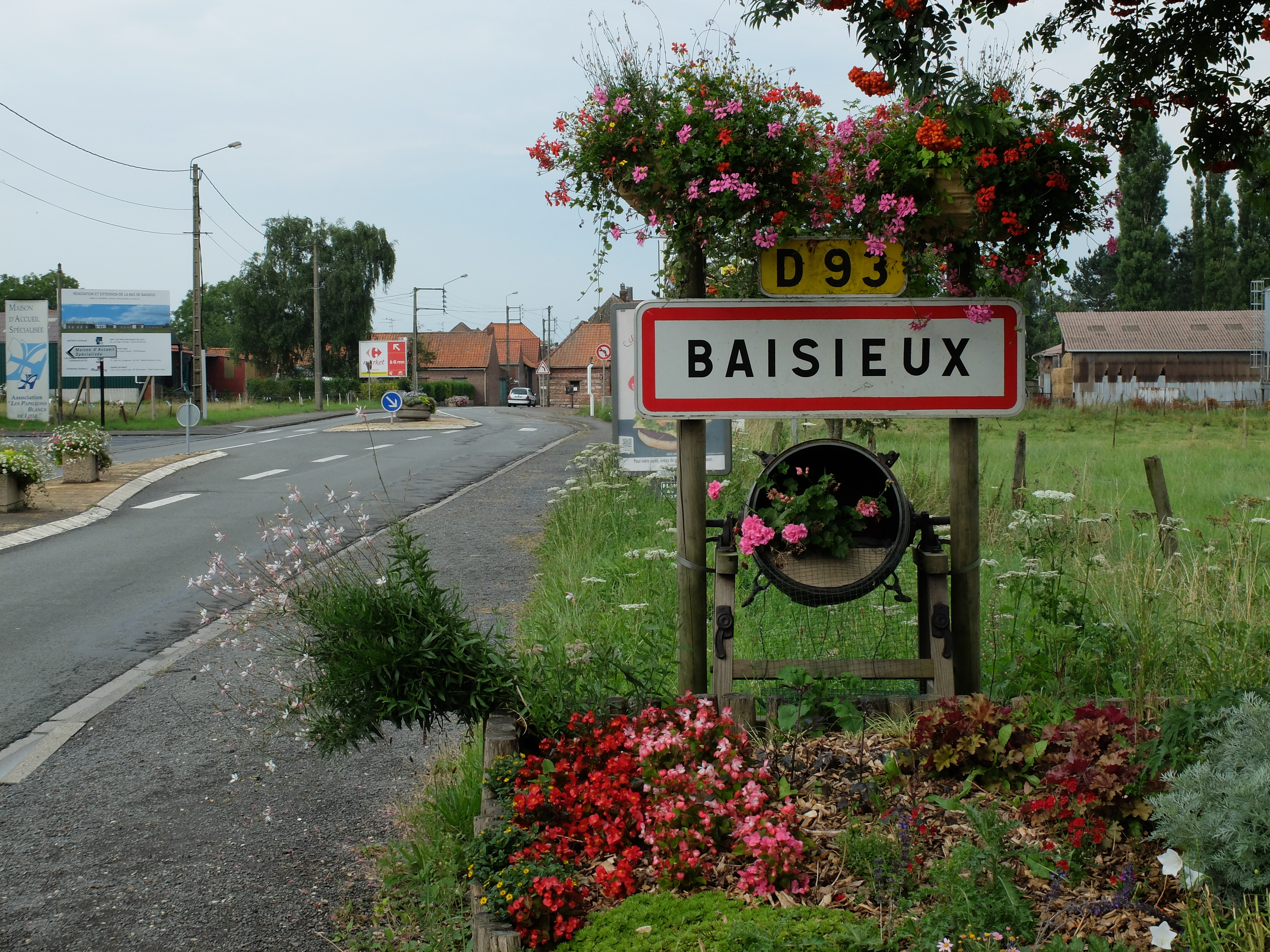
- The road into Baisieux

- Coat of arms
- Location of Baisieux
- Location within France Location within Hauts-de-France
- Coordinates: 50°36′33″N 3°15′11″E
- Country: France
- Region: Hauts-de-France
- Department: Nord
- Arrondissement: Lille
- Canton: Templeuve-en-Pévèle
- Intercommunality: Métropole Européenne de Lille

Government
  - Mayor (2020–2026): Philippe Limousin
- Area^{1}: 8.68 km^{2} (3.35 sq mi)
- Elevation: 28 m (92 ft)
- Highest elevation: 50 m (160 ft)
- Lowest elevation: 23 m (75 ft)
- Population (2023): 5,545
  - Density: 639/km^{2} (1,650/sq mi)
- Time zone: UTC+01:00 (CET)
  - Summer (DST): UTC+02:00 (CEST)
- INSEE/Postal code: 59044 /59780
- ^{1} French Land Register data, which excludes lakes, ponds, glaciers > 1 km^{2} (0.386 sq mi or 247 acres) and river estuaries.

Baisieux (French pronunciation: [bɛzjø]) is a commune in the Nord department, northern France. It is part of the Métropole Européenne de Lille.

== Population ==
Historical population

Year	Pop.	±% p.a.
1793	1,600	—
1821	1,674	+0.16%
1846	1,900	+0.51%
1872	2,020	+0.24%
1901	1,981	−0.07%
1926	2,134	+0.30%
1946	2,608	+1.01%
1962	2,879	+0.62%
1968	2,942	+0.36%

Year	Pop.	±% p.a.
1975	2,851	−0.45%
1982	3,505	+2.99%
1990	3,555	+0.18%
1999	4,039	+1.43%
2007	4,084	+0.14%
2012	4,571	+2.28%
2017	4,765	+0.83%
2023	5,545	+2.56%

Source: EHESS and INSEE (1968-2023)

== Heraldry ==
Arms of Baisieux	The arms of Baisieux are blazoned : Bendy Or and azure. (Baisieux, Bouvines and Cysoing use the same arms.)

== See also ==
- Communes of the Nord department
