= Englos =

- Commune
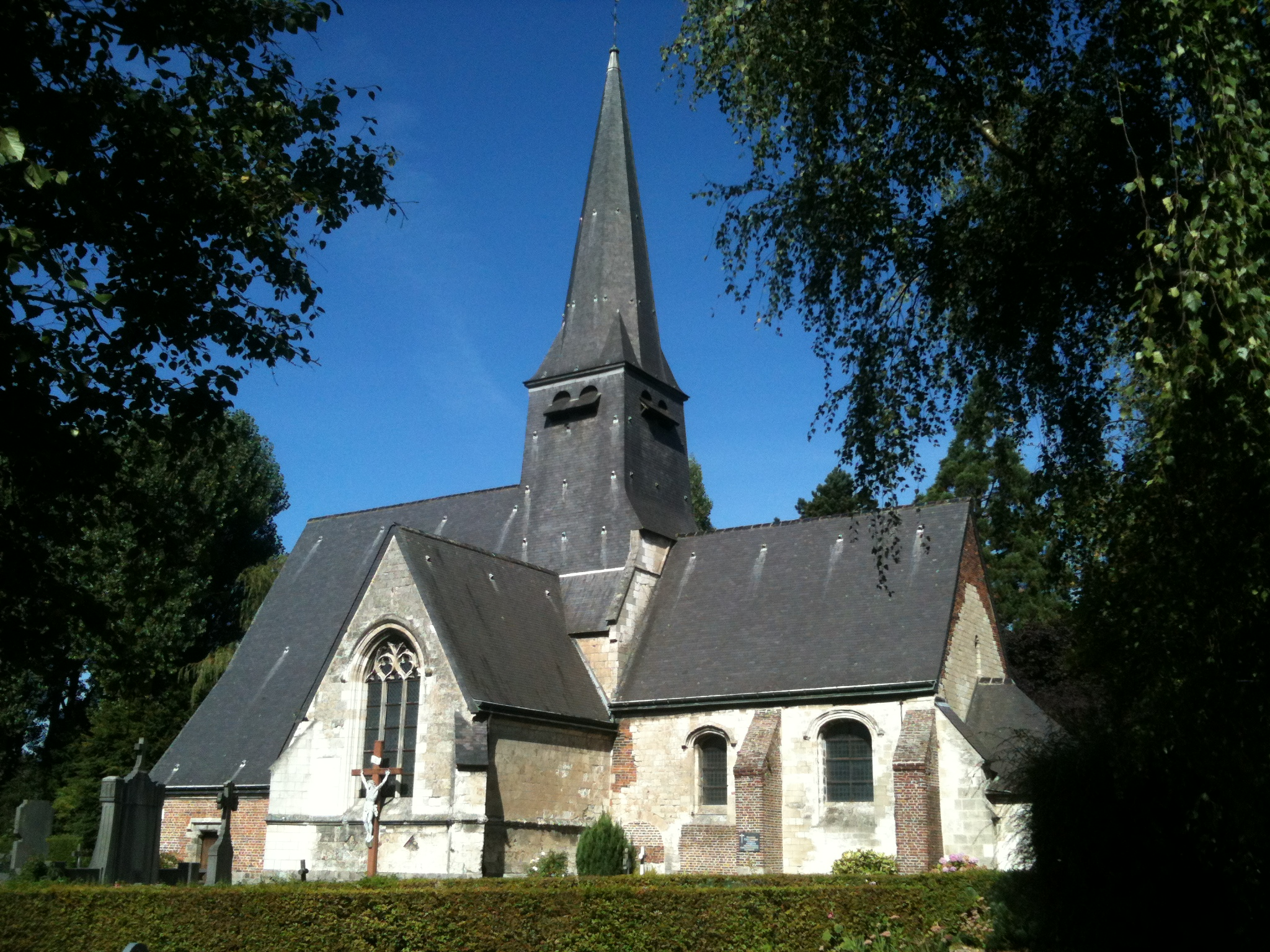
- Englos in the arrondissement of Lille

- Coat of arms
- Location of Englos
- Location within France Location within Hauts-de-France
- Coordinates: 50°37′33″N 2°57′27″E
- Country: France
- Region: Hauts-de-France
- Department: Nord
- Arrondissement: Lille
- Canton: Lille-6
- Intercommunality: Métropole Européenne de Lille

Government
  - Mayor (2020–2026): Martine Simon
- Area^{1}: 1.35 km^{2} (0.52 sq mi)
- Elevation: 42 m (138 ft)
- Population (2023): 618
  - Density: 458/km^{2} (1,190/sq mi)
- Time zone: UTC+01:00 (CET)
  - Summer (DST): UTC+02:00 (CEST)
- INSEE/Postal code: 59195 /59320
- ^{1} French Land Register data, which excludes lakes, ponds, glaciers > 1 km^{2} (0.386 sq mi or 247 acres) and river estuaries.

Englos (French pronunciation: [ɑ̃ɡlo]; Dutch: Engelo) is a commune in the Nord department in northern France.

== Geography ==
Englos is located west of Lille and about 10 km from the Belgian-French border. The village is surrounded by undeveloped land. The built up area is not continuous with the centre of Lille.

== History ==
The name, Englos, is of uncertain origin but may have derive from the d'Englos family, which owned some of the land before the 15th century. Subsequently, it fell into the control of the Ghent (Belgium) government until around the time of the French Revolution. It had a church built by the Benedictine monk in the 16th century which was later owned by Jesuits. The church was designated a historic building in 1921.

Later, the Duhamel family managed the largest farm in the village. The farm ceased production in 1969 when a commercial zone was established east of the village. Englos was a small agricultural village until the end of the 20th century. The development of the A25 highway contributed to its development as a residential community.

=== Heraldry ===
Arms of Englos	The arms of Englos are blazoned : Sable, an inescutcheon argent.

== Population ==
Historical population
Year	Pop.	±% p.a.
1968	345	—
1975	367	+0.89%
1982	436	+2.49%
1990	510	+1.98%
1999	507	−0.07%
2007	567	+1.41%
2012	562	−0.18%
2017	609	+1.62%
2023	618	+0.24%
Source: INSEE

== Economy ==
The area is known for its Auchan hypermarket and attached stores. There is an Opel car dealer across the road from the shopping centre. There is also a Novotel hotel in Englos.
