= European route E17 =

Numbered highway in the international E-road network

E17

Major junctions
- North end: Antwerp, Belgium
- South end: Beaune, France

Location
- Countries: Belgium, France

Highway system
- International E-road network; A Class; B Class

== History ==
Thoughts for creating the E17 started in the 1950s. Building of the motorway began in 1966 at Kortrijk. Belgian minister Omer Vanaudenhove had helped in funding the project by founding an intermunicipal association. The final large tracts of the road were finished in 1973. Until 1985, the road was named the European route E3.
