= Noyelles-sur-Mer station =

Railway station in Noyelles-sur-Mer, France

Noyelles-sur-Mer
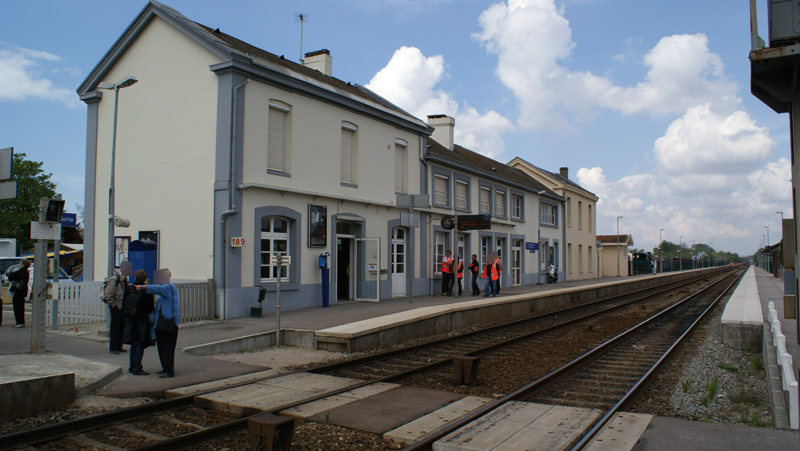
- Noyelles station

General information
- Location: Route du Crotoy, 80133 Noyelles-sur Mer, France
- Coordinates: 50°11′13″N 1°42′15″E
- Operator: TER Hauts-de-France; Chemin de fer de la Baie de Somme
- Lines: Longueau–Boulogne railway Chemin de fer de la Baie de Somme
- Platforms: 4
- Tracks: 5

Other information
- Station code: 87317396
Location

Noyelles-sur-Mer is a railway station serving the town Noyelles-sur-Mer, Somme department, northern France. It is served by mainline trains on the Boulogne - Abbeville line, and also by the Chemin de Fer de la Baie de Somme heritage railway trains to Le Crotoy, Saint-Valery-sur-Somme and Cayeux-sur-Mer.

== History ==
Noyelles station opened in 1845 when the Chemin de Fer du Nord standard gauge line between Boulogne, Pas-de-Calais and Amiens, Somme opened.

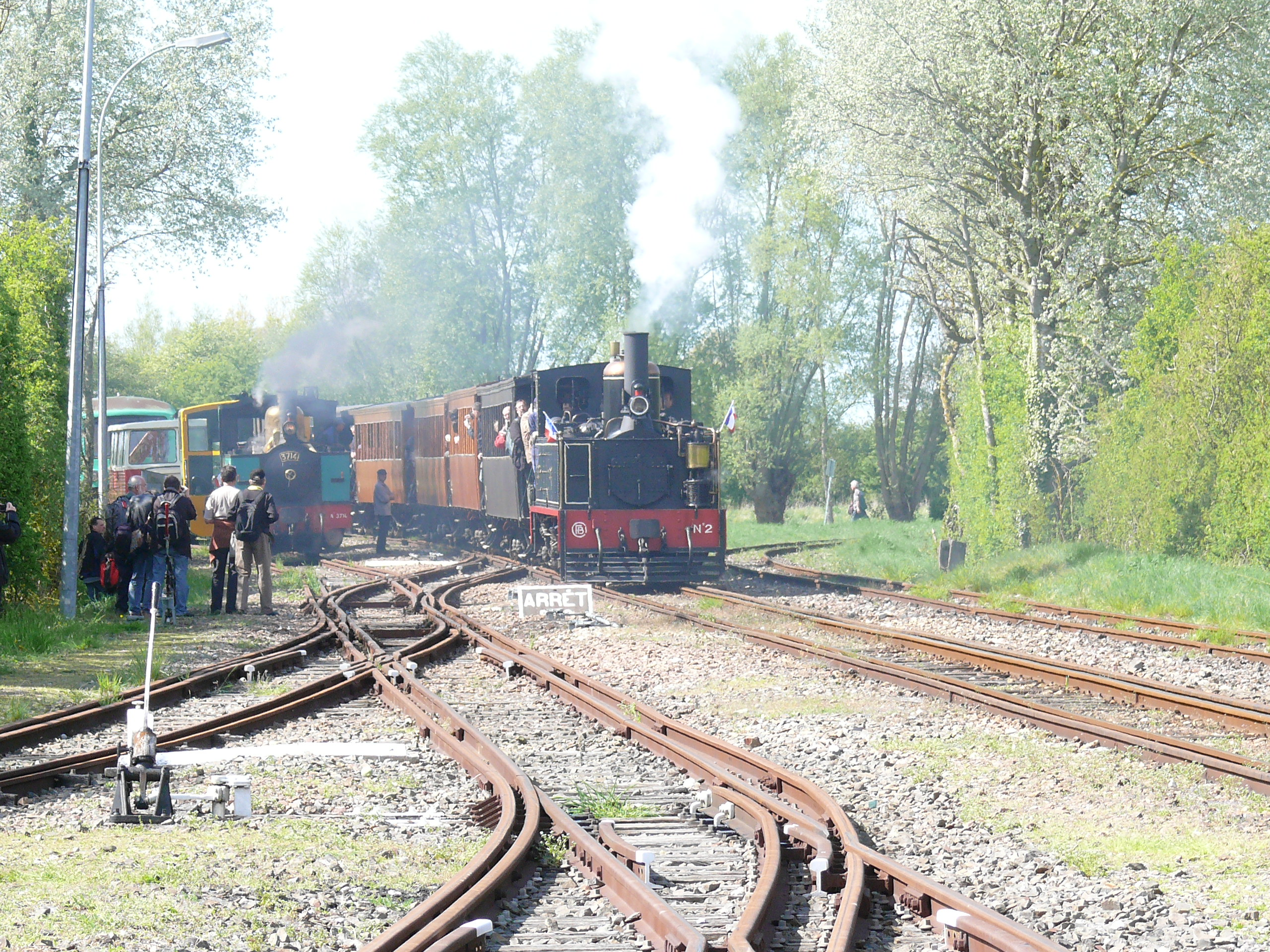
Approaching Noyelles, note the four-rail dual gauge track.

In 1858, a 6 kilometres (3.7 mi) standard gauge branch to St. Valery Quai was opened. Extension of the line was desired in the 1880s, but it was considered that it would be too expensive to build the line as standard gauge. Instead, the extensions were to be laid with metre gauge track. A 6 kilometres (3.7 mi) extension to Le Crotoy opened on 1 July 1887. A 19 kilometres (12 mi) metre gauge line to Cayeux-sur-Mer opened on 6 September 1887. This line was laid as a dual gauge line as far as St. Valery, with the metre gauge rails laid between the standard gauge rails. On 28 August 1892, an 11 kilometres (6.8 mi) metre gauge line opened to Forest-l'Abbaye, joining with a 42 kilometres (26 mi) long line between Abbeville and Dompierre-sur-Authie which had opened on 19 June 1892. The whole system became known as the Réseau des Bains de Mer.

The line to Forest l'Abbaye closed to passengers on 10 March 1947, but remained open for freight until 1 February 1951, although there was occasional traffic on the line until 1965. The line to Le Crotoy closed on 31 December 1969 and that to Cayeux on 31 December 1972. by which time the line to Le Crotoy had reopened as a heritage railway. The line to Cayeux was subsequently reopened as a heritage railway, and the two lines operate as the Chemin de Fer de la Baie de Somme. The standard gauge line to St. Valery was operated by SNCF until 6 February 1989 and officially closed from 1 January 1993.

== Services ==
Preceding station	TER Hauts-de-France	Following station
Abbeville towards Paris-Nord	Krono K16	Rue towards Calais
Abbeville towards Amiens	Krono K21	Rue towards Calais

	Heritage railways	
Terminus	Chemin de Fer de la Baie de Somme; Noyelles – Le Crotoy	Morlay
Terminus	Chemin de Fer de la Baie de Somme; Noyelles – St. Valery Quai	St. Valery Quai
Terminus	Chemin de Fer de la Baie de Somme; Noyelles – Cayeux-sur-Mer	St. Valery Ville
	Disused railways	
Terminus	Réseau des Bains de Mer; Noyelles – Cayeux-sur-Mer; Noyelles – St. Valery Quai	St. Valery Canal
Terminus	Réseau des Bains de Mer; Noyelles – Forest-l'Abbaye	Sailly-Bray
