= Nouvion =

- Commune
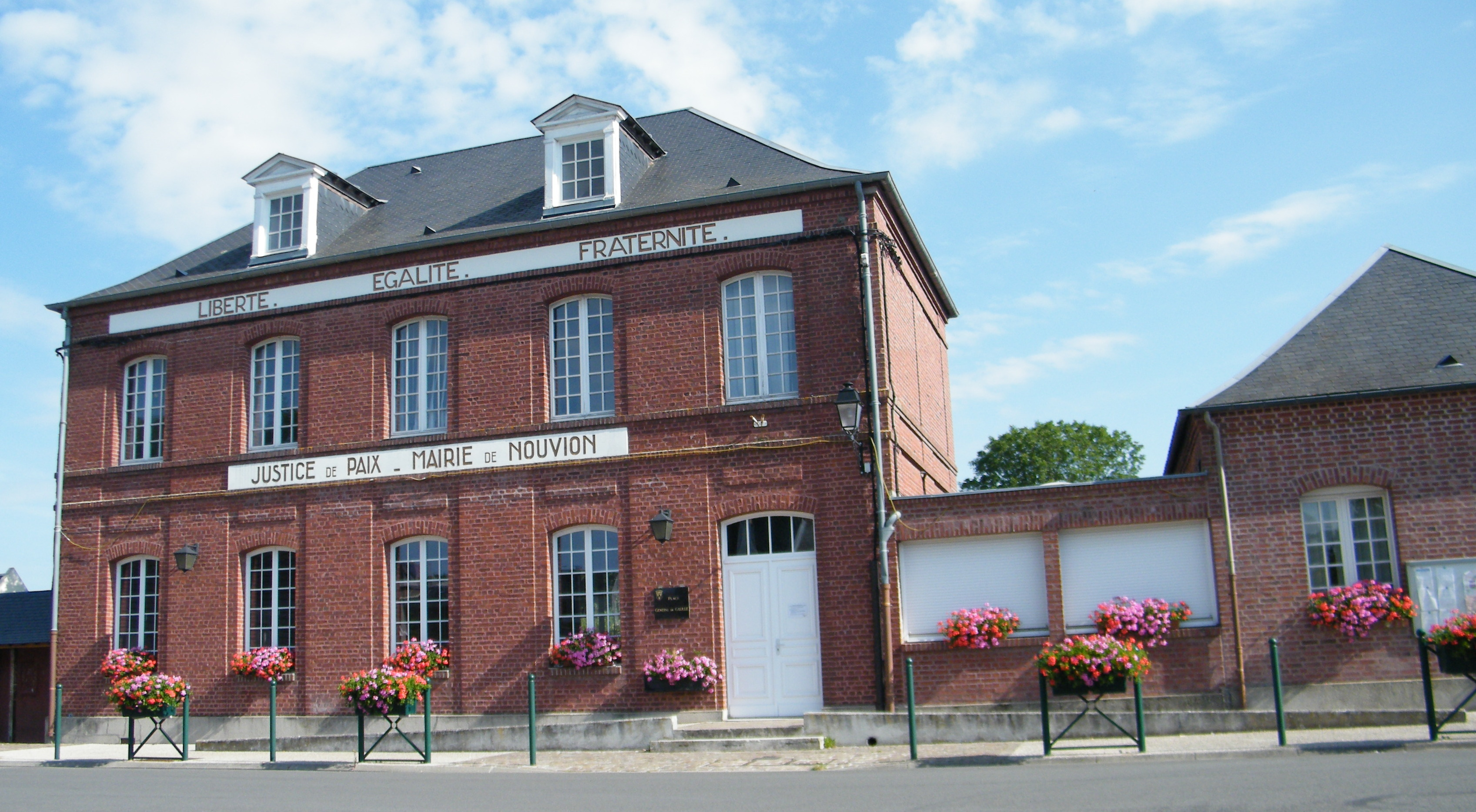
- The town hall in Nouvion

- Coat of arms
- Location of Nouvion
- Location within France Location within Hauts-de-France
- Coordinates: 50°12′46″N 1°46′29″E
- Country: France
- Region: Hauts-de-France
- Department: Somme
- Arrondissement: Abbeville
- Canton: Abbeville-1
- Intercommunality: CC Ponthieu-Marquenterre

Government
  - Mayor (2020–2026): Maurice Forestier
- Area^{1}: 15.73 km^{2} (6.07 sq mi)
- Elevation: 7 m (23 ft)
- Highest elevation: 55 m (180 ft)
- Lowest elevation: 7 m (23 ft)
- Population (2023): 1,196
  - Density: 76.03/km^{2} (196.9/sq mi)
- Time zone: UTC+01:00 (CET)
  - Summer (DST): UTC+02:00 (CEST)
- INSEE/Postal code: 80598 /80860
- ^{1} French Land Register data, which excludes lakes, ponds, glaciers > 1 km^{2} (0.386 sq mi or 247 acres) and river estuaries.

Nouvion (French pronunciation: [nuvjɔ̃]; or sometimes Nouvion-en-Ponthieu) is a commune in the Somme department in Hauts-de-France in northern France.

== Geography ==
Nouvion is situated 10 miles (16 km) north of Abbeville, between the Somme estuary and the forest of Crécy, on the D1001 (ex-N1 national) departmental road junction with the departmental road D111.

== Railway ==
Nouvion had a station on the Noyelles/Forest-l'Abbaye branch of the Réseau des Bains de Mer. It opened on 24 August 1892, and closed on 10 March 1947, although the line itself remained open for freight until 1 February 1951.

== Media ==
Nouvion is the setting for the BBC sitcom 'Allo 'Allo! However, no scenes were filmed in the town, with filming instead taking place in Norfolk in England.

== Demography ==
Historical population
Year	Pop.	±% p.a.
1968	1,026	—
1975	1,004	−0.31%
1982	1,102	+1.34%
1990	1,232	+1.40%
1999	1,210	−0.20%
2007	1,232	+0.23%
2012	1,264	+0.51%
2017	1,316	+0.81%
2023	1,196	−1.58%
Source: INSEE

== See also ==
- Communes of the Somme department
