= Estrées-lès-Crécy =

- Commune
- Coat of arms
- Location of Estrées-lès-Crécy
- Location within France Location within Hauts-de-France
- Coordinates: 50°15′14″N 1°55′45″E
- Country: France
- Region: Hauts-de-France
- Department: Somme
- Arrondissement: Abbeville
- Canton: Rue
- Intercommunality: CC Ponthieu-Marquenterre

Government
  - Mayor (2020–2026): Isabelle Alexandre
- Area^{1}: 11.19 km^{2} (4.32 sq mi)
- Elevation: 75 m (246 ft)
- Highest elevation: 84 m (276 ft)
- Lowest elevation: 33 m (108 ft)
- Population (2023): 398
  - Density: 35.6/km^{2} (92.1/sq mi)
- Time zone: UTC+01:00 (CET)
  - Summer (DST): UTC+02:00 (CEST)
- INSEE/Postal code: 80290 /80150
- ^{1} French Land Register data, which excludes lakes, ponds, glaciers > 1 km^{2} (0.386 sq mi or 247 acres) and river estuaries.

Estrées-lès-Crécy (French pronunciation: [ɛstʁe lɛ kʁesi], literally Estrées near Crécy; Picard: Étrèe-lès-Carcy) is a commune in the Somme department in Hauts-de-France in northern France.

== Geography ==
The commune is situated on the D938 road, near the site of the Battle of Crecy, 16 kilometres (10 mi) north of Abbeville.

== Railway ==
There was a railway station (Crécy-Estrées) on the branch of the Réseau des Bains de Mer which ran between Abbeville and Dompierre-sur-Authie. It opened on 19 June 1892 and closed to passengers on 10 March 1947. It closed to freight on 1 February 1951.

== Population ==
Historical population
Year	Pop.	±% p.a.
1968	406	—
1975	380	−0.94%
1982	358	−0.85%
1990	353	−0.18%
1999	362	+0.28%
2007	367	+0.17%
2012	393	+1.38%
2017	391	−0.10%
2023	398	+0.30%
Source: INSEE

== See also ==
- Communes of the Somme department
