= Baie de Somme =

Bay at the Somme estuary, in Picardy, France

Coordinates: 50.2014°N 1.6269°E

Designations

Ramsar Wetland
- Designated: 23 January 1998
- Reference no.: 925

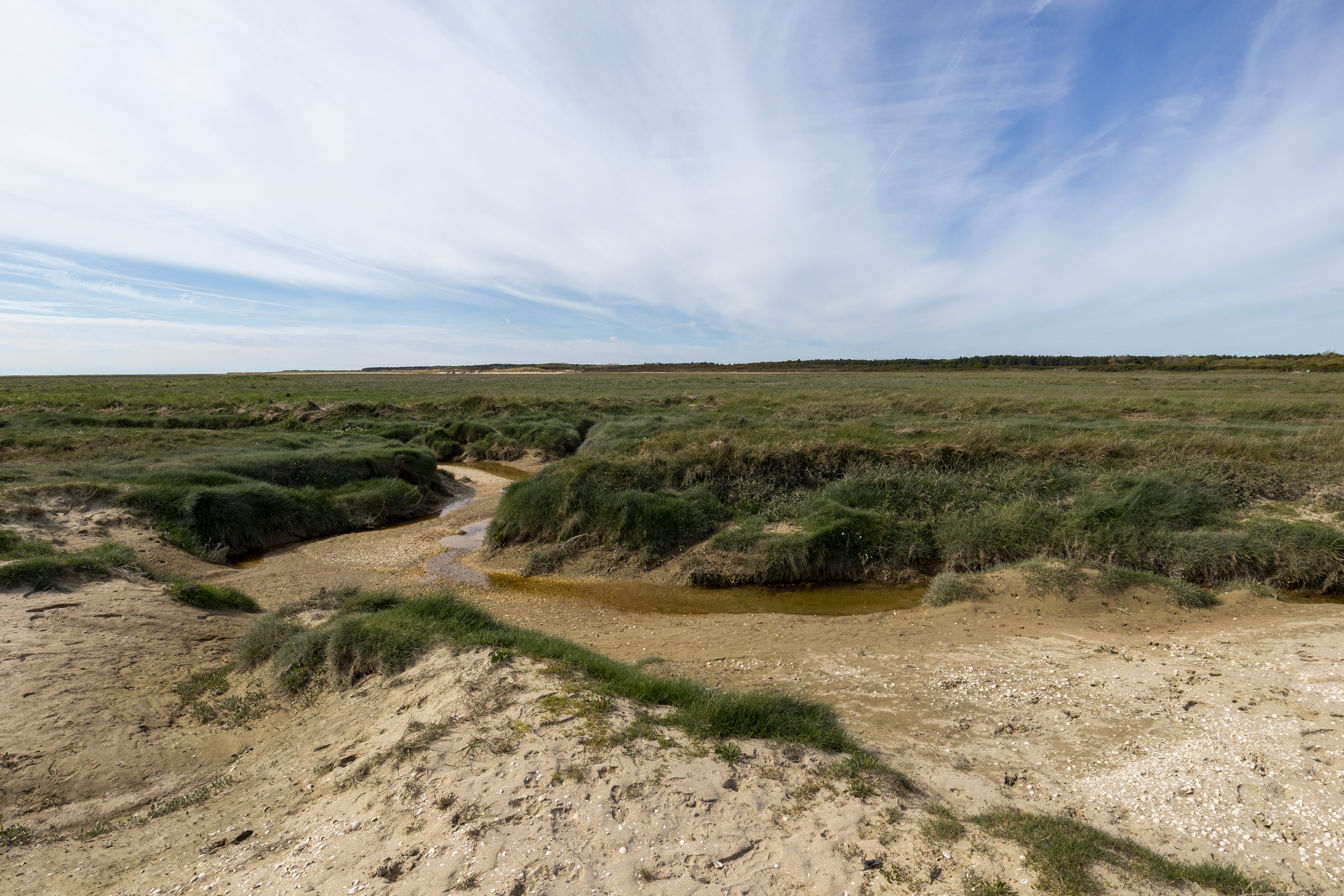
The Baie de Somme

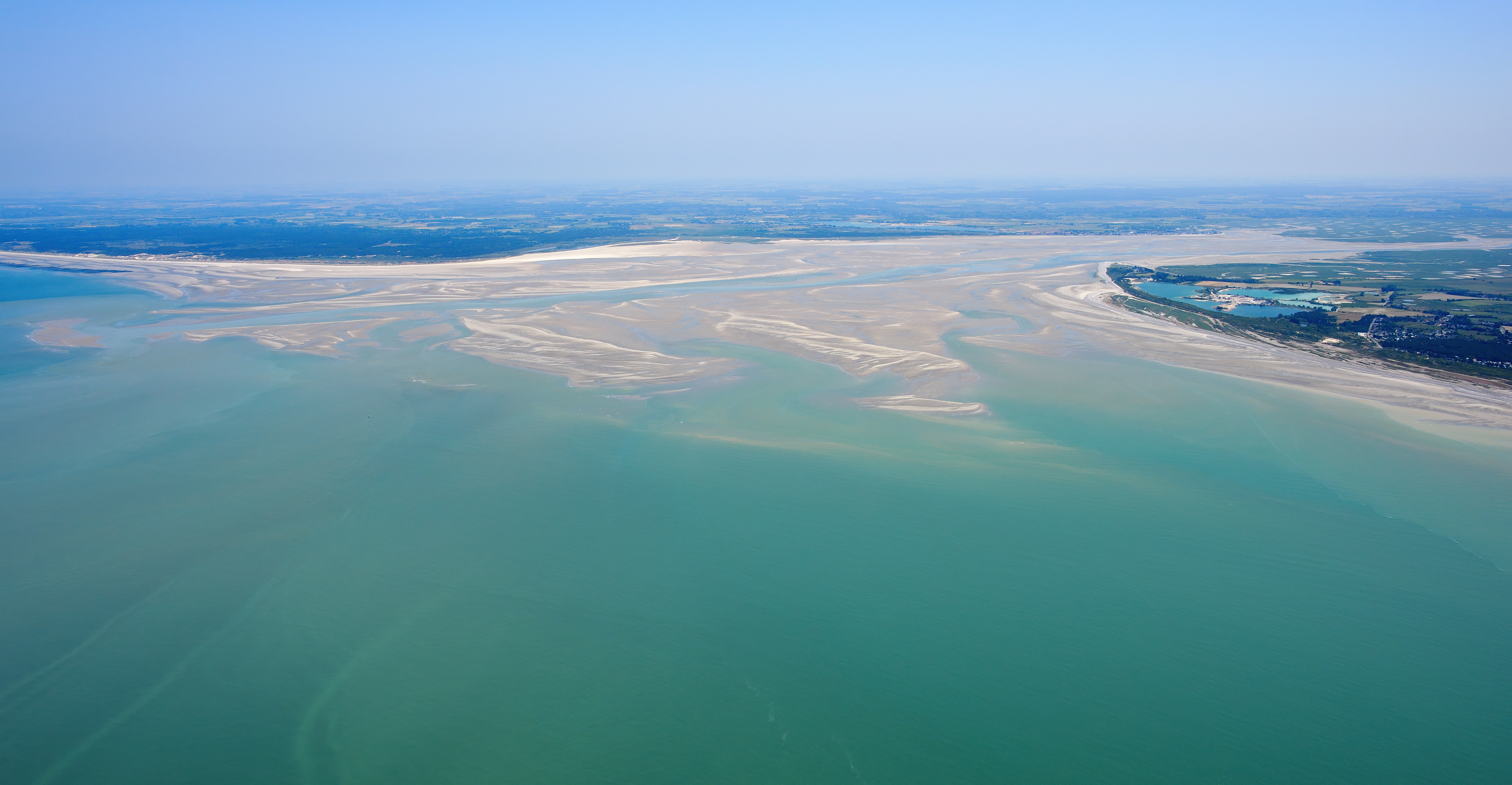
Aerial view

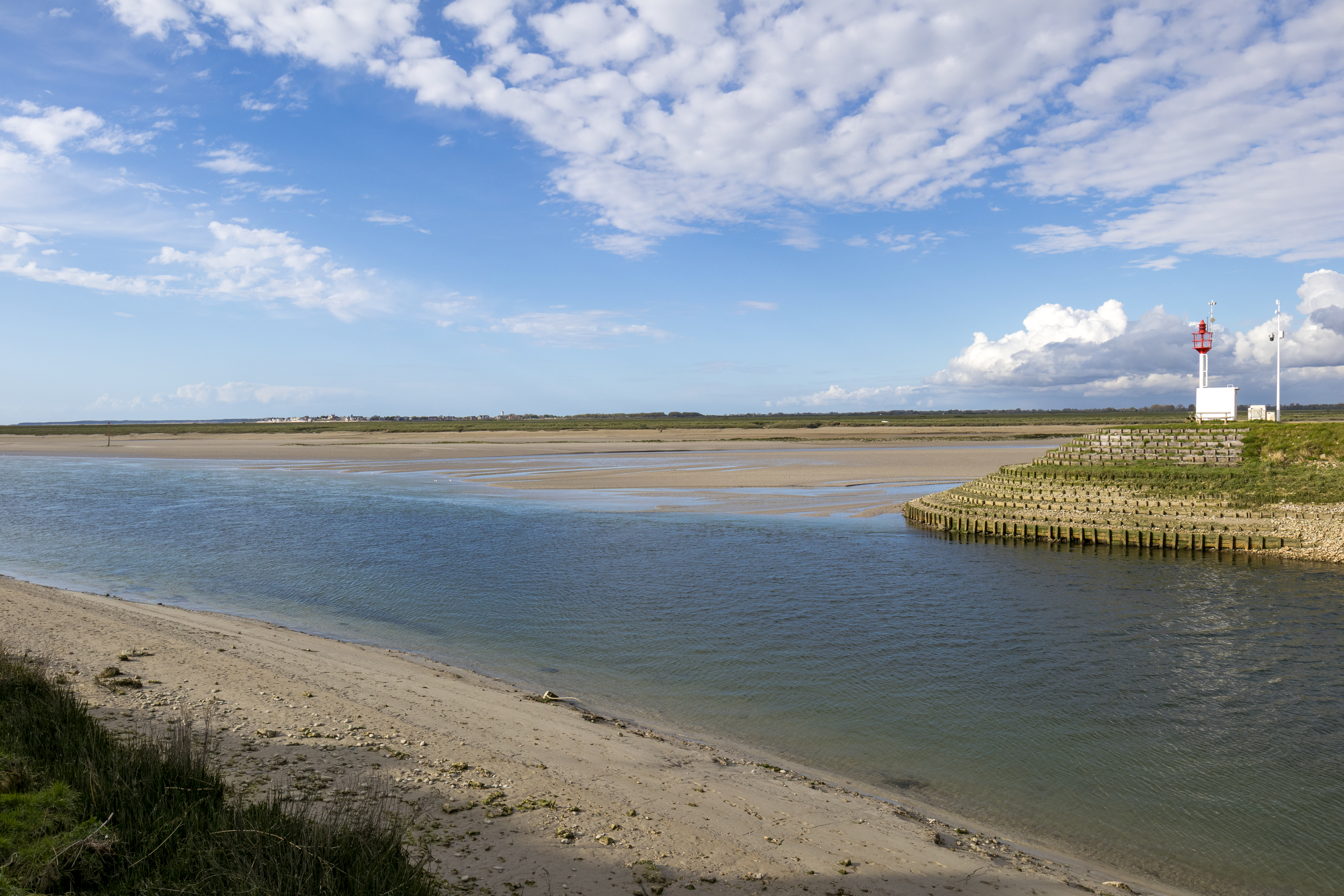
View of Saint-Valéry-sur-Somme

Baie de Somme (French pronunciation: [bɛ də sɔm], Bay of the Somme or Somme Bay; Picard: Béie d'Sonme) is a large estuary in the Hauts-de-France region of France. The bay drains six rivers into the English Channel, principally the River Somme, and covers a total area of 72 km^{2} (28 sq mi). The bay is noted for its ornithological richness, as well as being a major tourist attraction.

When the tide is out, the Baie is characterized by wide, flat areas of marsh and sand, from which the delicacy of glasswort (locally:salicornes) are collected. Small ponds, dug into the marshes and filled with fake plastic ducks, are used to attract migratory birds for hunting. As the tide rises the bay fills, during which time numerous working, leisure and tourist boats cross between the surrounding villages.

The largest towns on the bay are Saint-Valery-sur-Somme, Le Crotoy, Cayeux-sur-Mer and, a few miles inland of the bay, Noyelles-sur-Mer. Other smaller towns such as Le Hourdel, Le Tréport, or Mers-les-Bains are sparsely located around the region. These towns are popular tourist destinations, and are connected together by the preserved steam railway line, the Chemin de Fer de la Baie de Somme. Several of the towns together form the Communauté d'agglomération de la Baie de Somme. The Bay of Somme is the habitat of multiple fauna and flora species, the most famous being probably the Grey seal and the Harbor seal, locally referred as "phoque veau-marin". Its population can be estimated at 650 to 700 individuals living in the bay, whereas the Grey seal has a smaller population of around 350 individuals.
