= Saint-Valery-sur-Somme =

Saint-Valery-sur-Somme Saint-Wary (Picard)
- Commune
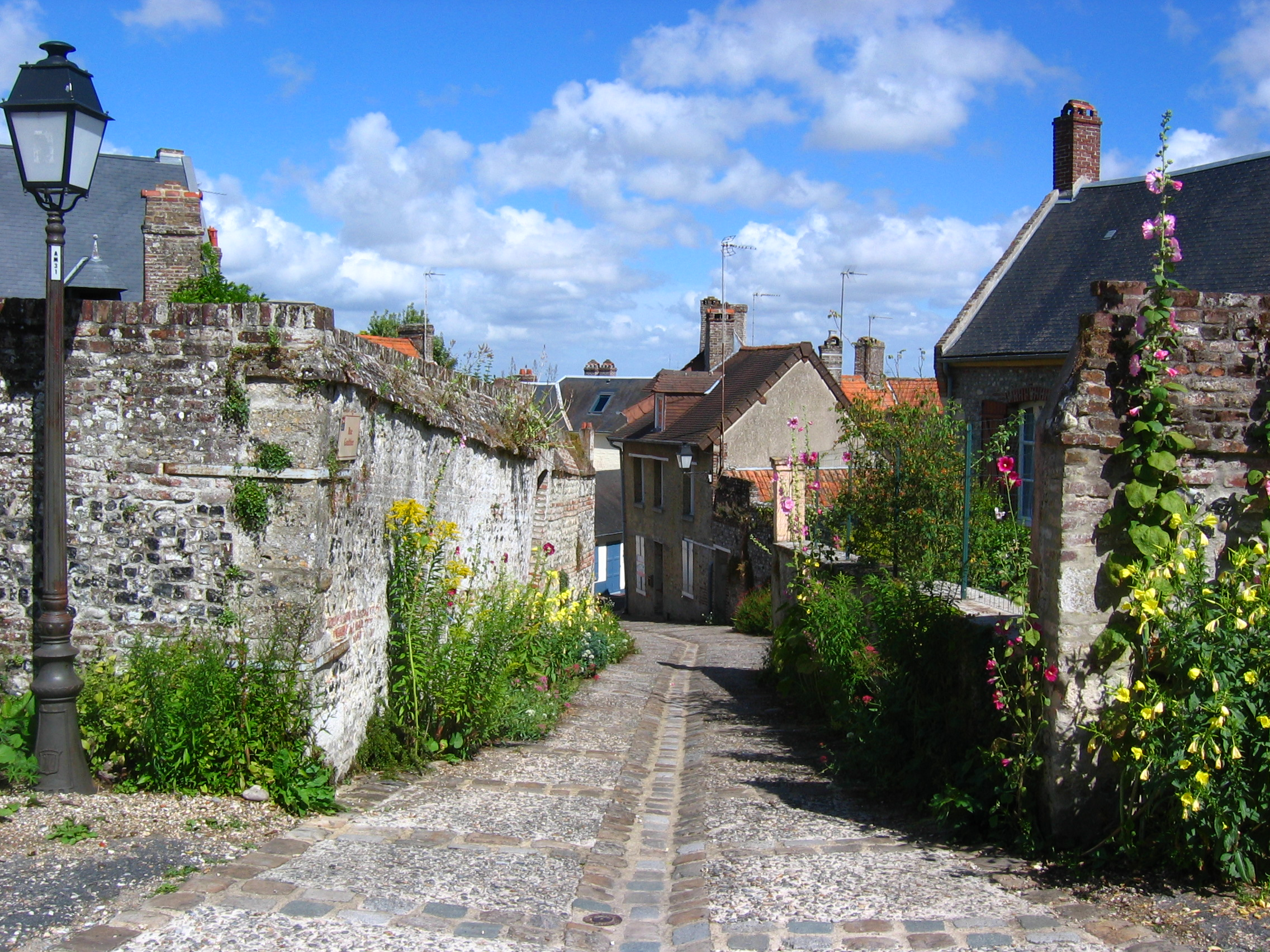
- Gaultier Street

- Coat of arms
- Location of Saint-Valery-sur-Somme
- Location within France Location within Hauts-de-France
- Coordinates: 50°11′20″N 1°37′50″E
- Country: France
- Region: Hauts-de-France
- Department: Somme
- Arrondissement: Abbeville
- Canton: Abbeville-2
- Intercommunality: CA Baie de Somme

Government
  - Mayor (2020–2026): Daniel Chareyron
- Area^{1}: 10.5 km^{2} (4.1 sq mi)
- Elevation: 40 m (130 ft)
- Highest elevation: 43 m (141 ft)
- Lowest elevation: 1 m (3.3 ft)
- Population (2023): 2,306
  - Density: 220/km^{2} (569/sq mi)
- Time zone: UTC+01:00 (CET)
  - Summer (DST): UTC+02:00 (CEST)
- INSEE/Postal code: 80721 /80230
- ^{1} French Land Register data, which excludes lakes, ponds, glaciers > 1 km^{2} (0.386 sq mi or 247 acres) and river estuaries.

Saint-Valery-sur-Somme (French pronunciation: [sɛ̃ valʁi syʁ sɔm], literally Saint-Valery on Somme; Picard: Saint-Wary), commune in the Somme department, is a seaport and resort on the south bank of the River Somme estuary. The town's medieval character and ramparts, its Gothic church and long waterside boardwalk, make it a popular tourist destination.

== Geography ==
The commune lies on the Hauts-de-France coast by the Baie de la Somme and at the mouth of the canalised river Somme. It is 30 kilometres (19 miles) north-west of Abbeville and to the west of the battlefields of the Somme. Most of the commune lies adjacent to the sea and the Somme river on the Quai du Romerel, Quai Courbet, Quai Jeanne d'Arc, Quai Blavet and the Quai Perree. The oldest part of the commune lies on the northern coast, to the north-west of the main settlement. To the south is the main road, the CD940, between Abbeville and Cayeux-sur-Mer.

=== River Somme ===
The River Somme is canalised, with sea locks at the eastern end of the town. From Saint-Valery-sur-Somme to Abbeville, the Canal de la Somme has been completely straightened, after which it follows a winding course to Amiens and beyond. Although no longer a busy commercial waterway, it gives an attractive and calm introduction to the French canals and the greater European canal network, thereby avoiding the busy ferry ports of Calais and Dunkirk.

=== Railway ===
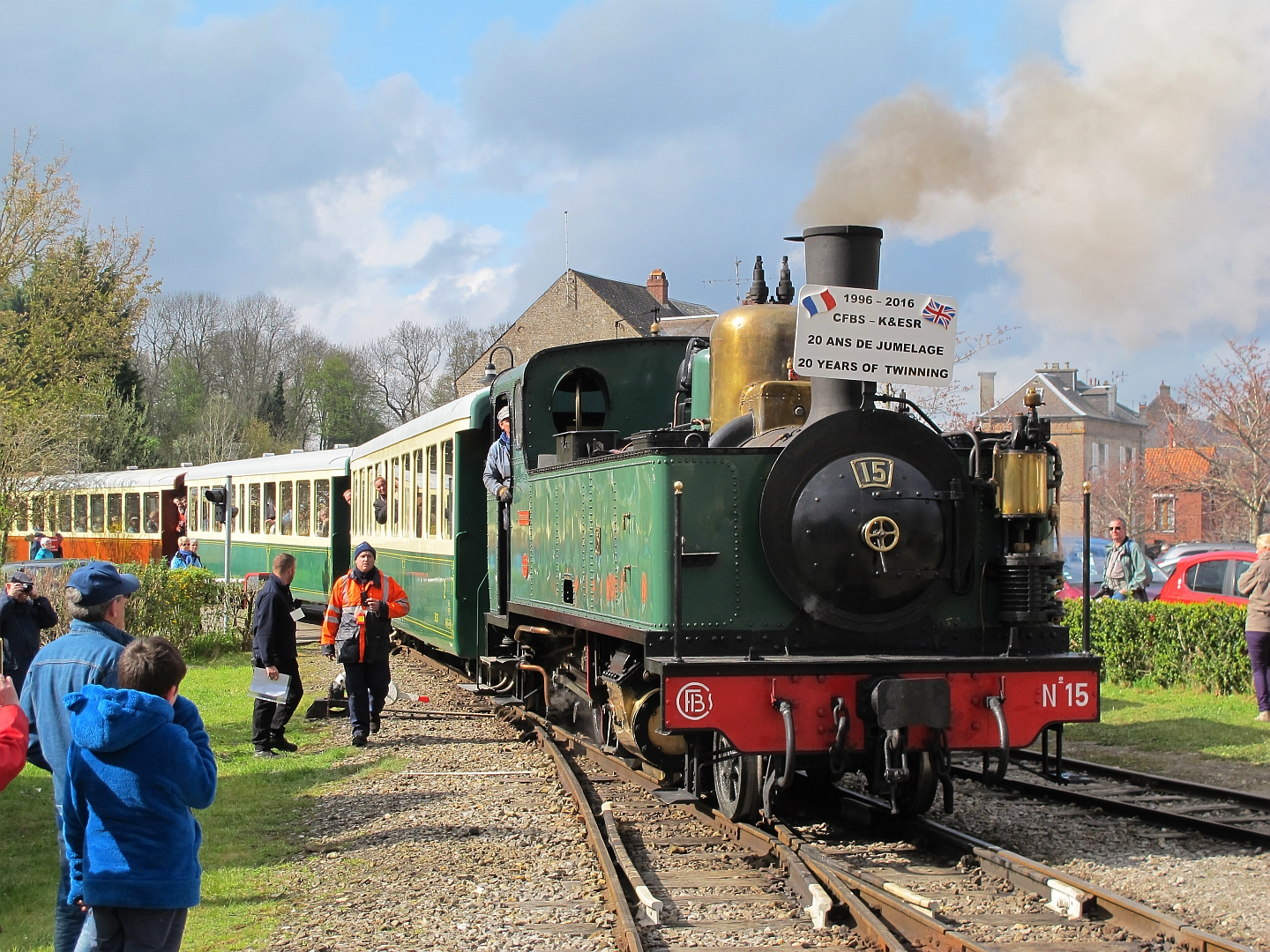
Haine St. Pierre N°15

Saint-Valery has a station (and out-of-season terminus) of the narrow gauge "Chemin de Fer de la Baie de Somme" (Somme Bay Railway), which is now largely a tourist attraction. Running around the entire length of the bay, this railway connects Le Crotoy with Noyelles-sur-Mer, and Saint-Valery; in the summer season trains also run from Saint-Valery to Cayeux-sur-Mer and the sands at Brighton Plage.

=== Places of interest ===
- The abbey church
- The sea lock, controlling the flow of the Somme river
- The stone tower, where, according to a tradition, Jeanne d'Arc was detained
- The house where Anatole France resided

== History ==
The history of the commune dates back to before the era of the Roman invasion, when it was a small settlement inhabited by Gauls. The Roman invasion encouraged the small hamlet to grow into a small village, and after the Romans left France the village soon came under the power of the Franks. In 611, the monk Gualaric (Walric), also known as Valery, arrived in the area. He installed himself as a hermit on the headland of the site of Leuconaus, now the Cap Hornu. His virtue and miracles quickly attracted disciples. These disciples formed a primitive abbey. The saint was then buried there in 622 and the "Chapelle des marins" was erected in 628 by Saint Blimont over his burial place. Clotaire II (King of Neustrie) provided the foundations of the new abbey in 627. The relics of the saint attracted many pilgrims to the abbey, which had become known as Saint-Valery. During the 8th and 9th century, the abbey and village were plundered and devastated on several occasions by the Vikings.

The village grew during the 10th and 11th centuries and was historically significant as the site where William the Conqueror assembled his fleet before sailing to invade England in 1066. During the Hundred Years' War, the village passed between French, English and Burgundian control, during which the English demolished the abbey and cloister in order to strengthen the nearby St Valery castle. In 1431, Joan of Arc was held prisoner in the local prison, whence she was then conveyed to Rouen and burnt at the stake. The cell in which she was held can still be found near part of the old village walls.

The commune found peace and prosperity during the 15th, 16th and 17th centuries. The abbey was rebuilt and still stands today. The activity of the port flourished, thanks to the export of the wines and the growth of the herring industry. It was near enough to Paris to be one of the earlier suppliers of the chasse marée merchants. The commune mirrors the history of France, becoming a site of religious conflict between Protestants and Catholics and later as a source of conflict during the French Revolution. The commune was popular during the 19th century with artists and writers and Victor Hugo, Jules Verne, Alfred Sisley and Edgar Degas all had villas here at one time or another.

== Population ==
Historical population
Year	Pop.	±% p.a.
1968	3,240	—
1975	3,072	−0.76%
1982	2,935	−0.65%
1990	2,769	−0.73%
1999	2,686	−0.34%
2007	2,805	+0.54%
2012	2,703	−0.74%
2017	2,510	−1.47%
2023	2,306	−1.40%
Source: INSEE

== Economy ==
=== Businesses ===
The traditional fishing sector still exists, although in very marked decline.

Commerce, crafts, banking, hotels, restaurants, and other tourist services dominate today's Valerician economy.

The town has a hospital, schools: kindergartens, primary and middle school, as well as the Baie de Somme study station of the University of Picardie Jules-Verne (UPJV).

=== Harbor ===
Saint-Valery-sur-Somme is a marina and a fishing port.

Fishing is an activity in decline due to the increasing silting up of the bay. The silting forces fishermen to go offshore and leave the bay, which shortens the length of the fishing day. Navigation in the channel is becoming more and more difficult for trawlers.

Sailing is developing sailboats or motorboats are increasingly replacing fishing boats.

== Cultural events ==
Each July, the city commemorates the departure of William the Conqueror for the conquest of England. This festival is organized by the Association des Fêtes Guillaume le Conquérant, member of the French Federation of Historical Festivals. For two days, street entertainment, stalls, people in costumes, and musicians enliven the old town.

Saint-Valery takes part in the Steam Festival, a railway event unique in Europe due to its scale and organized by the Baie de Somme railway service.

Every year since 2009, a theater festival takes place in the last week of June. Professional artists from all backgrounds come together to offer the public quality shows in the old town, home of artists from all centuries, such as Victor Hugo and Anatole France. It celebrates a festive moment where the public is invited into the flowery streets to follow the actors on the path of the old stones.

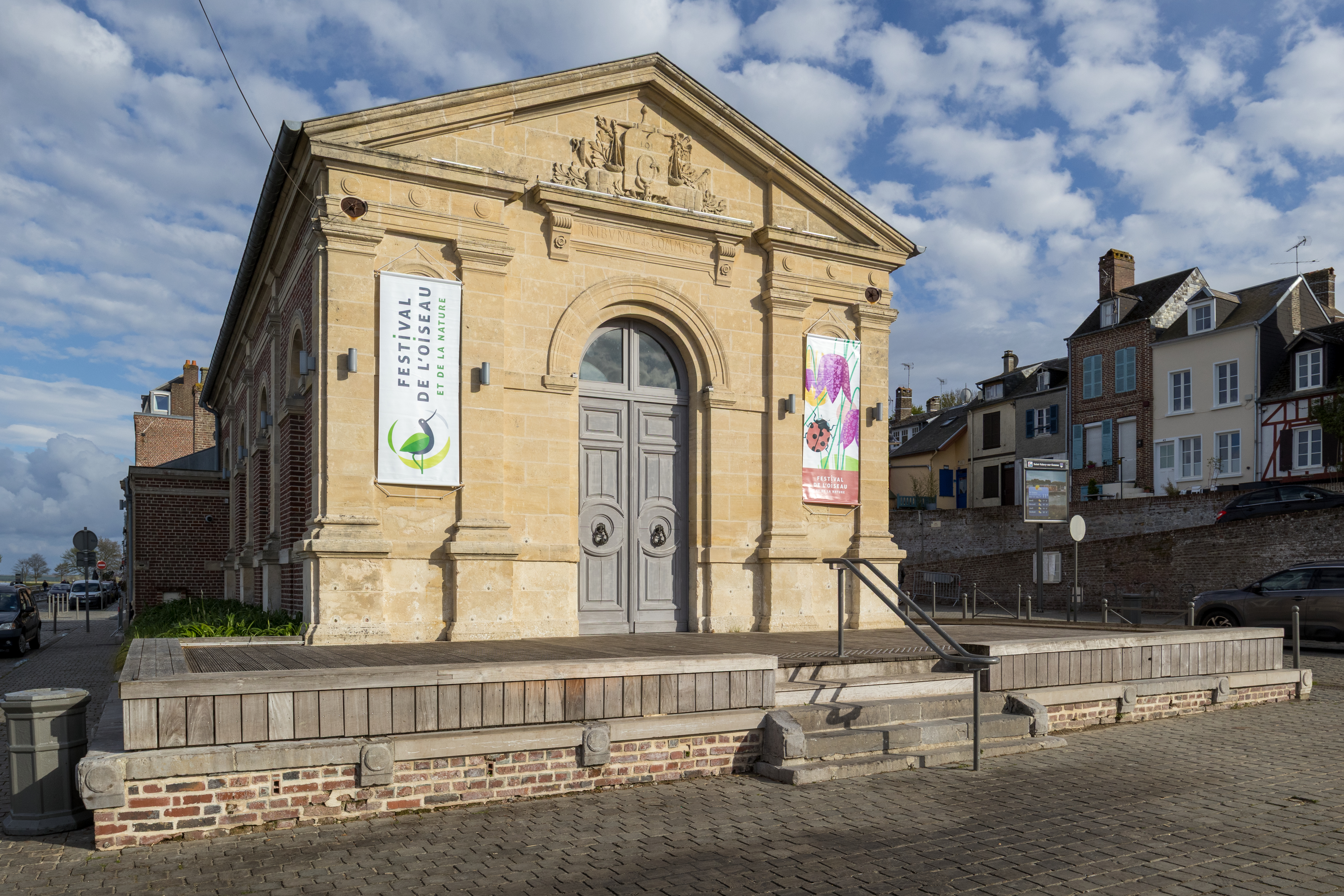
The commercial court was built in 1870. Today, it is an exhibition space.

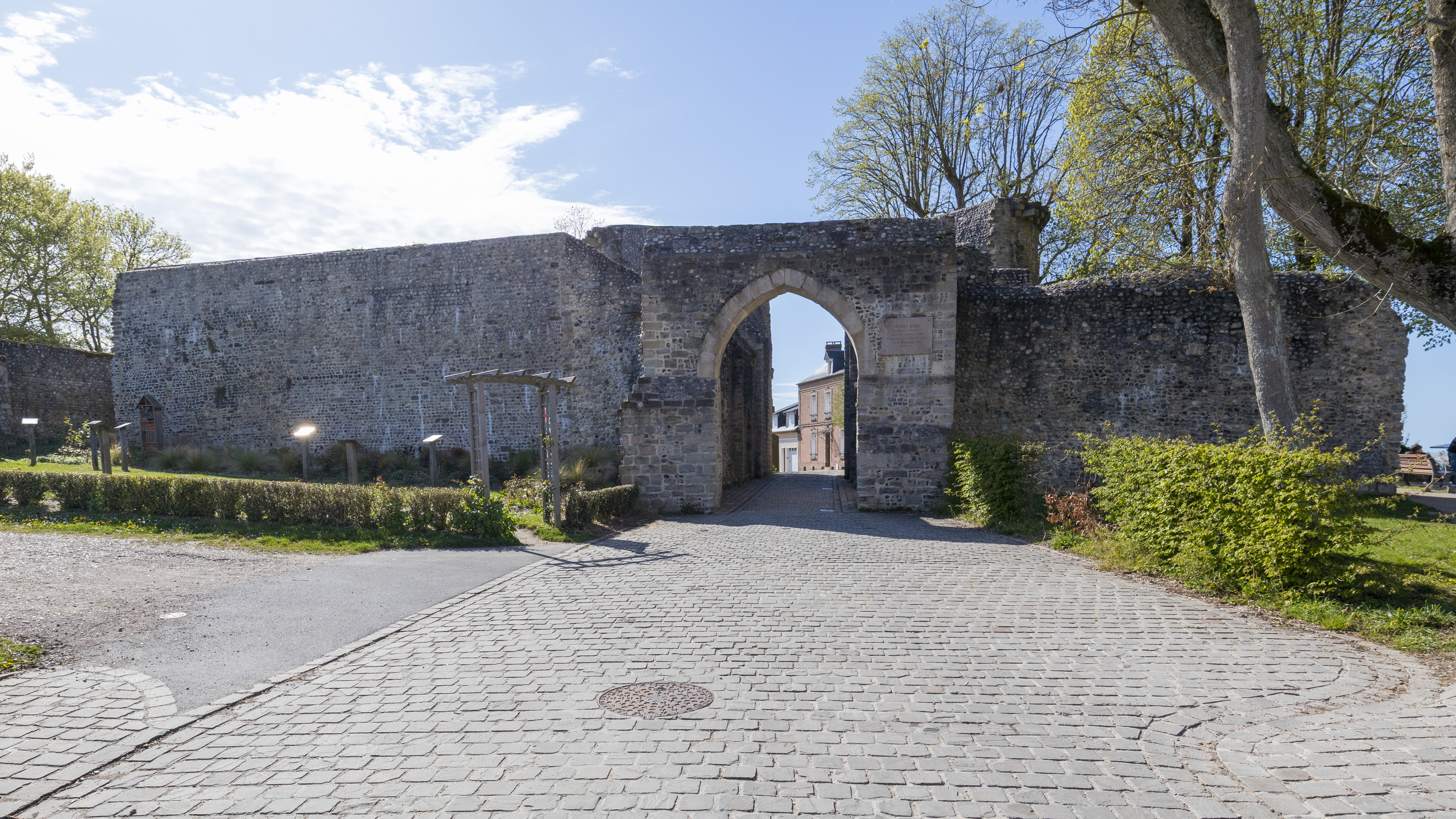
William Gate

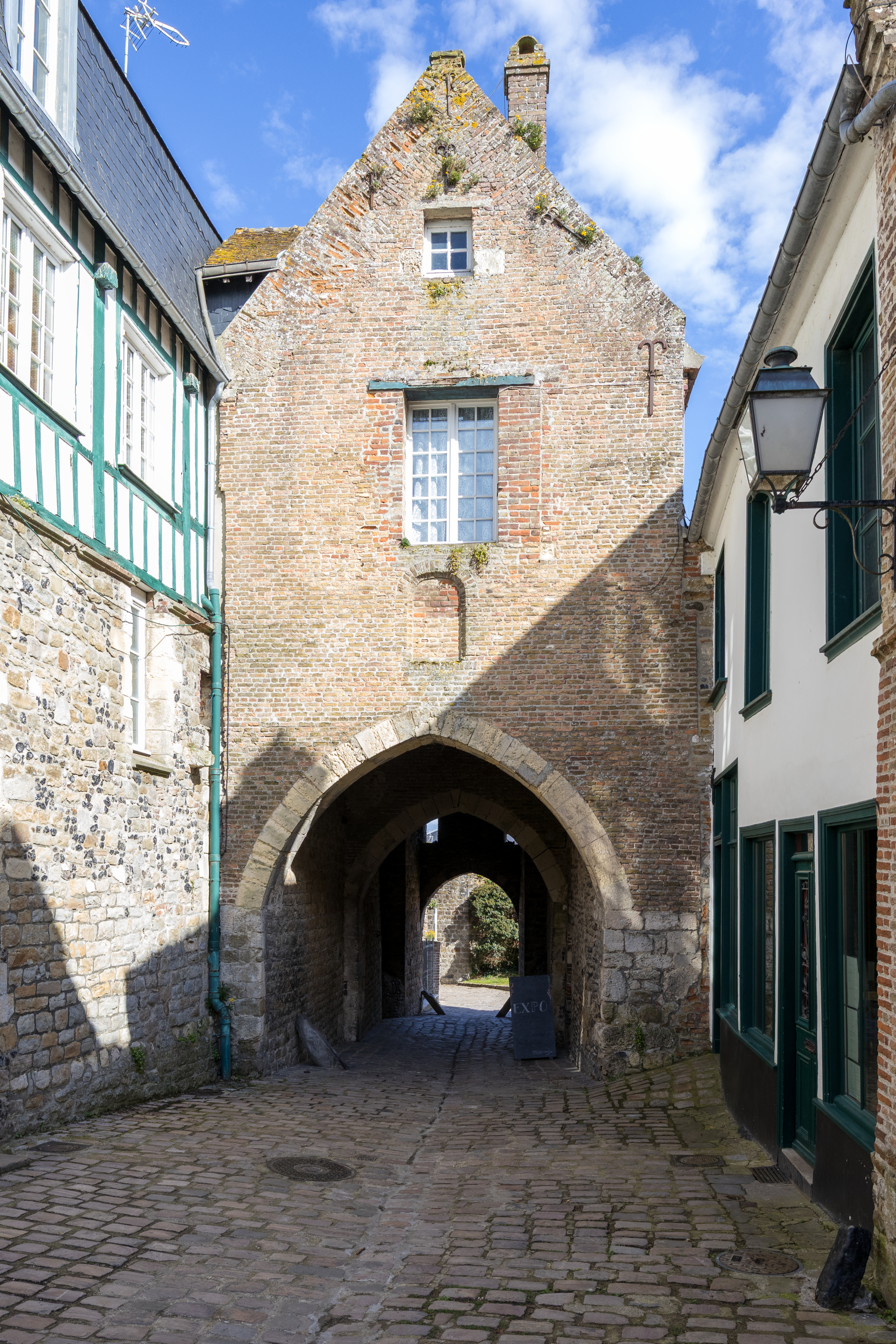
Nevers Gate

== See also ==
- Communes of the Somme department
- Chemin de Fer de la Baie de Somme
- Réseau des Bains de Mer

== International relations ==
Saint-Valery-sur-Somme is twinned with:

- Battle, United Kingdom
- Ronse, Belgium
