= Château de Dompierre (Somme) =

Castle in Hauts-de-France, France

- Dompierre-sur-Authie, Hauts-de-France, France

Site information
- Owner: Balliol family

Location
- Coordinates: 50°18′13″N 1°55′09″E

Château de Dompierre was a castle near Dompierre-sur-Authie, Hauts-de-France, France. It once belonged to the English and Scottish Balliol family.

The castle of Dompierre was forfeited to the French Crown in 1331 and was later granted to Thomas de Marigny.
