= Rue station =

Railway station in Rue, France

Coordinates: 50°16′23″N 1°40′33″E

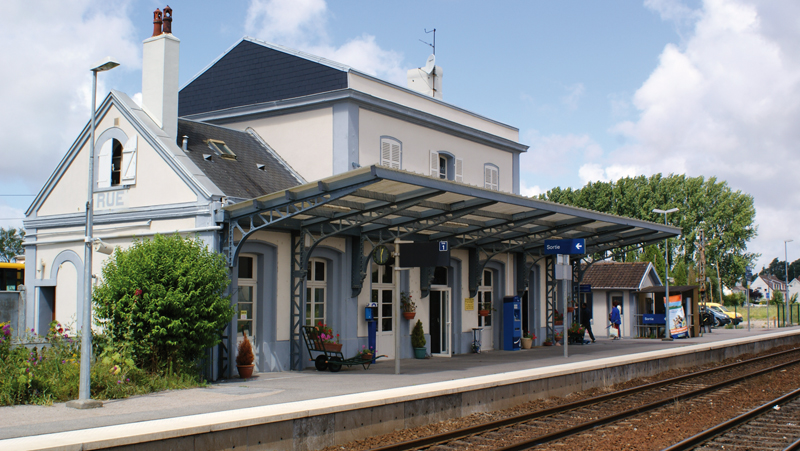
Rue station

Rue is a railway station serving the town Rue, Somme department, northern France. The station is served by regional trains to Boulogne and Amiens.

Preceding station	TER Hauts-de-France	Following station
Noyelles-sur-Mer towards Paris-Nord	Krono K16	Rang-du-Fliers towards Calais
Noyelles-sur-Mer towards Amiens	Krono K21	Rang-du-Fliers towards Calais
