= Canchy, Somme =

Canchy
- Commune
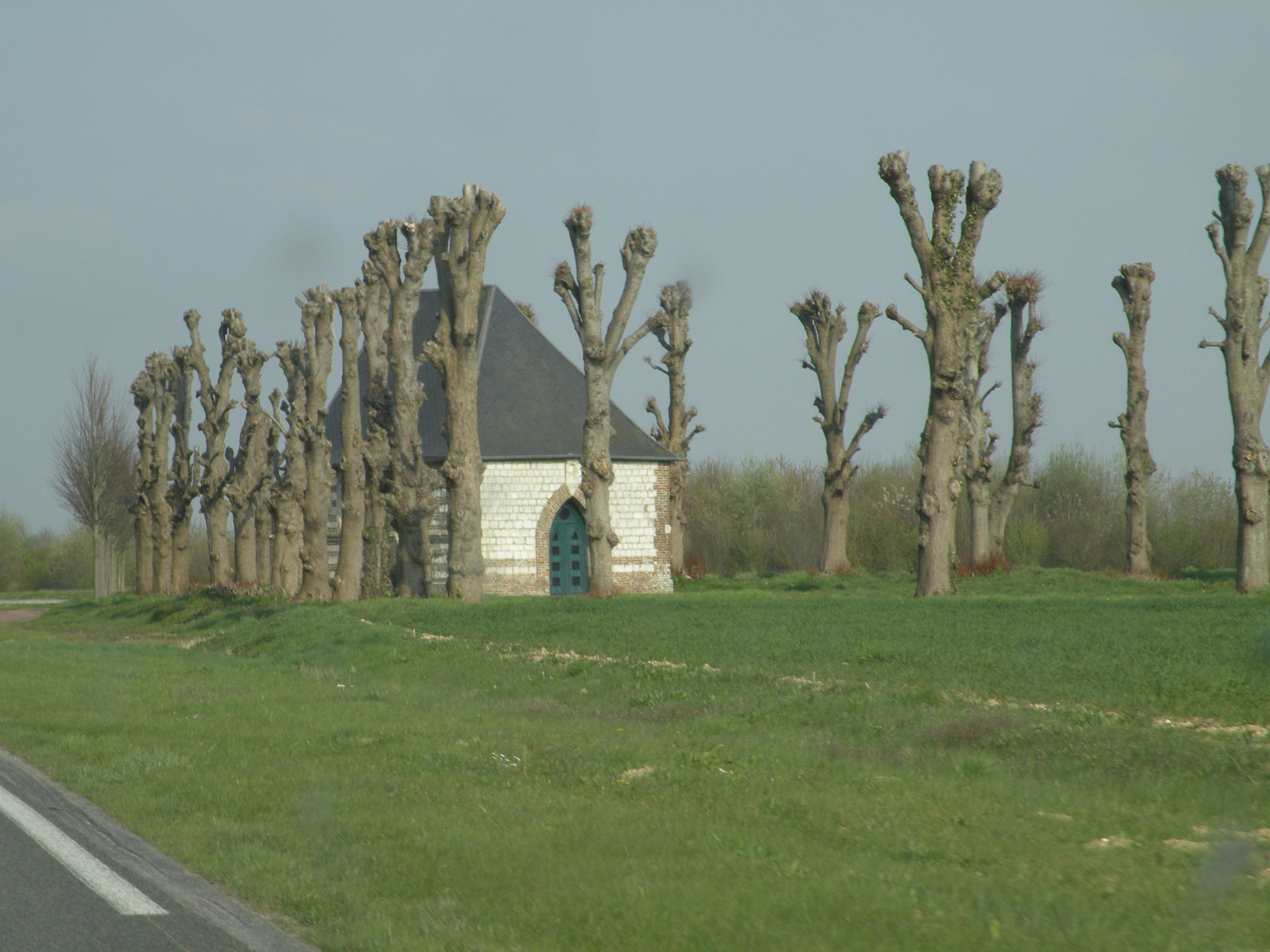
- The Chapel of Notre-Dame-de-Foy in Canchy
- Location of Canchy
- Location within France Location within Hauts-de-France
- Coordinates: 50°11′14″N 1°52′42″E
- Country: France
- Region: Hauts-de-France
- Department: Somme
- Arrondissement: Abbeville
- Canton: Abbeville-1
- Intercommunality: CC Ponthieu-Marquenterre

Government
  - Mayor (2020–2026): Jean Grosbeau
- Area^{1}: 6.47 km^{2} (2.50 sq mi)
- Elevation: 74 m (243 ft)
- Highest elevation: 79 m (259 ft)
- Lowest elevation: 32 m (105 ft)
- Population (2023): 348
  - Density: 53.8/km^{2} (139/sq mi)
- Time zone: UTC+01:00 (CET)
  - Summer (DST): UTC+02:00 (CEST)
- INSEE/Postal code: 80167 /80150
- ^{1} French Land Register data, which excludes lakes, ponds, glaciers > 1 km^{2} (0.386 sq mi or 247 acres) and river estuaries.

Canchy (French pronunciation: [kɑ̃ʃi]) is a commune in the Somme department in Hauts-de-France in northern France.

There was a station on the Réseau des Bains de Mer which opened on 19 June 1892 and closed on 10 March 1947.

== Geography ==
Canchy is situated just off the D928 road (it now bypasses the town), some 5 miles (8 km) north of Abbeville.

== Population ==
Historical population
Year	Pop.	±% p.a.
1968	380	—
1975	346	−1.33%
1982	327	−0.80%
1990	313	−0.55%
1999	307	−0.21%
2007	298	−0.37%
2012	314	+1.05%
2017	322	+0.50%
2023	348	+1.30%
Source: INSEE

== See also ==
- Communes of the Somme department
- André Abbal
