= Forest-l'Abbaye =

- Commune
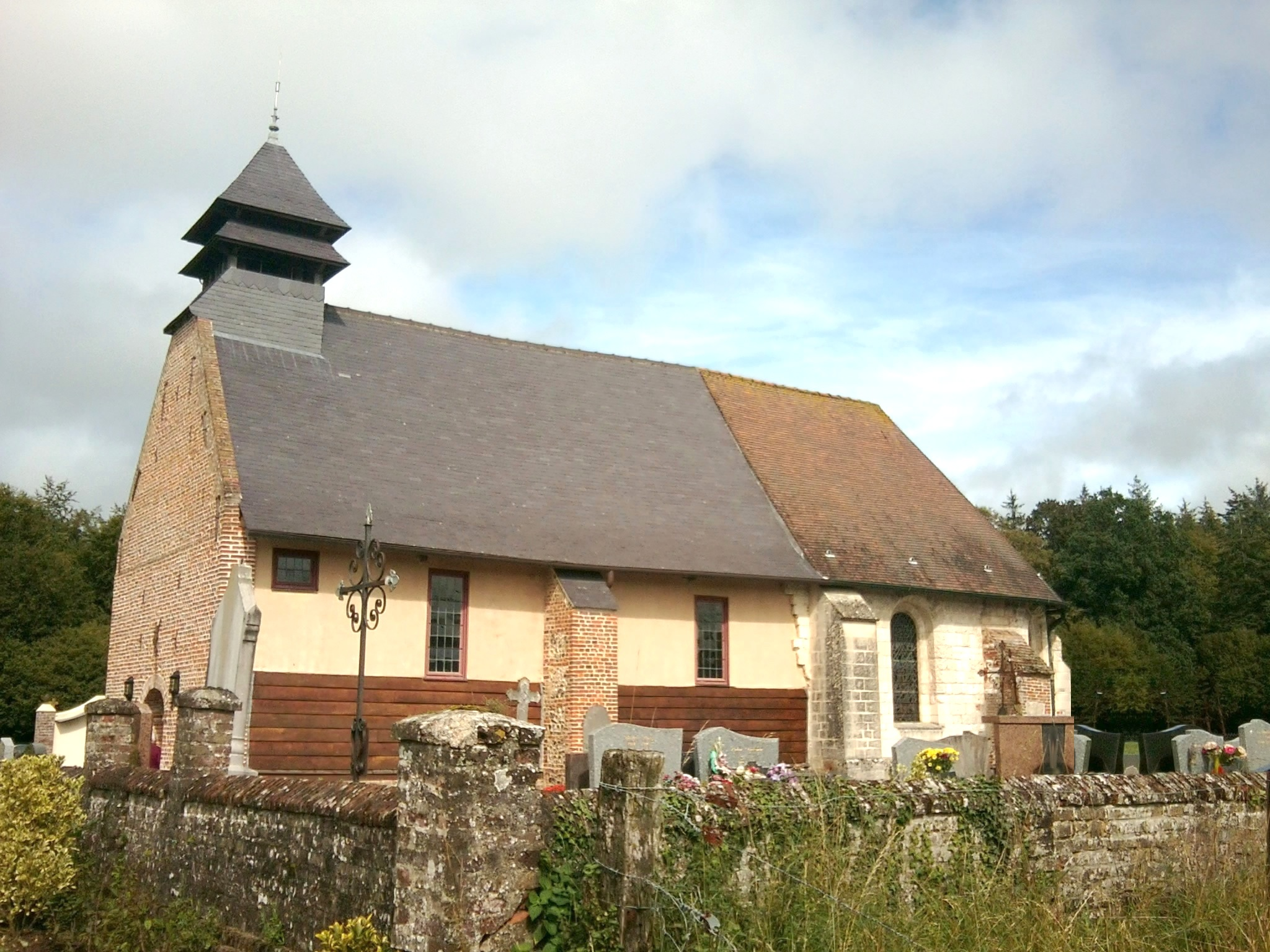
- The church in Forest-l'Abbaye
- Location of Forest-l'Abbaye
- Location within France Location within Hauts-de-France
- Coordinates: 50°12′10″N 1°49′24″E
- Country: France
- Region: Hauts-de-France
- Department: Somme
- Arrondissement: Abbeville
- Canton: Abbeville-1
- Intercommunality: CC Ponthieu-Marquenterre

Government
  - Mayor (2020–2026): Daniel Wallet
- Area^{1}: 3.3 km^{2} (1.3 sq mi)
- Elevation: 40 m (130 ft)
- Highest elevation: 63 m (207 ft)
- Lowest elevation: 29 m (95 ft)
- Population (2023): 314
  - Density: 95/km^{2} (250/sq mi)
- Time zone: UTC+01:00 (CET)
  - Summer (DST): UTC+02:00 (CEST)
- INSEE/Postal code: 80331 /80150
- ^{1} French Land Register data, which excludes lakes, ponds, glaciers > 1 km^{2} (0.386 sq mi or 247 acres) and river estuaries.

Forest-l'Abbaye (French pronunciation: [fɔʁɛ labei]; Picard: Fèr-l'Abbie) is a commune in the Somme department in Hauts-de-France in northern France.

== Geography ==
The commune is situated on the D105 road, on the edge of the forest of Crécy, 13 kilometres (8 mi) north of Abbeville.

== History ==
There was a station on the Réseau des Bains de Mer located on the line from Abbeville to Dompierre-sur-Authie, opened on 19 June 1892. Forest-l'Abbaye was the junction for the branch of the Réseau des Bains de Mer to Noyelles-sur-Mer, which opened on 24 August 1892. The station and both lines closed to passengers on 10 March 1947. The line to Abbeville closed to freight on that date, but the line to Noyelles remained open to freight until 1 February 1951.

== Population ==
Historical population
Year	Pop.	±% p.a.
1968	356	—
1975	322	−1.42%
1982	290	−1.48%
1990	307	+0.71%
1999	306	−0.04%
2007	315	+0.36%
2012	304	−0.71%
2017	301	−0.20%
2023	314	+0.71%
Source: INSEE

== See also ==
- Communes of the Somme department
- Réseau des Bains de Mer
