= Noyelles-sur-Mer =

- Commune
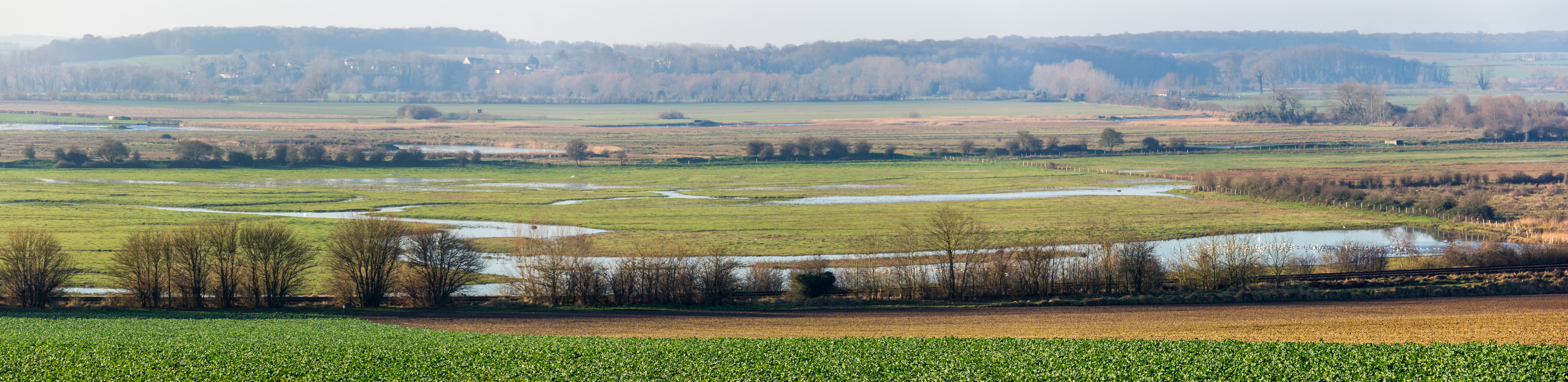
- The Baie de Somme, near Noyelles-sur-Mer

- Coat of arms
- Location of Noyelles-sur-Mer
- Location within France Location within Hauts-de-France
- Coordinates: 50°11′04″N 1°42′35″E
- Country: France
- Region: Hauts-de-France
- Department: Somme
- Arrondissement: Abbeville
- Canton: Abbeville-1
- Intercommunality: CC Ponthieu-Marquenterre

Government
  - Mayor (2022–2026): Martial Balsamo
- Area^{1}: 20.01 km^{2} (7.73 sq mi)
- Elevation: 7 m (23 ft)
- Highest elevation: 42 m (138 ft)
- Lowest elevation: 0 m (0 ft)
- Population (2023): 636
  - Density: 31.8/km^{2} (82.3/sq mi)
- Time zone: UTC+01:00 (CET)
  - Summer (DST): UTC+02:00 (CEST)
- INSEE/Postal code: 80600 /80860
- ^{1} French Land Register data, which excludes lakes, ponds, glaciers > 1 km^{2} (0.386 sq mi or 247 acres) and river estuaries.

Noyelles-sur-Mer (French pronunciation: [nwajɛl syʁ mɛʁ], literally Noyelles on Sea) is a commune in the Somme department in Hauts-de-France in northern France.

== Geography ==
Noyelles-sur-Mer is situated on the coast, facing the English Channel, on the D11 and D40 junction, some 13 kilometres (8 mi) northwest of Abbeville.

== History ==
On 20 May 1940 at 02:00 in the early morning, Noyelles-sur-Mer became one of the first French settlements on the coast of the English Channel occupied by the Wehrmacht during the Battle of France.

== Railways ==
Noyelles has a railway station on the Boulogne–Amiens line. There is also a heritage railway at Noyelles, the Chemin de Fer de la Baie de Somme, which formed part of the Réseau des Bains de Mer system. A dual gauge line goes to Saint-Valery-sur-Somme, and a metre gauge line continues on to Cayeux. Another metre gauge line goes to Le Crotoy. A further metre gauge line, now closed, went to Forest-l'Abbaye, where it connected with the line between Abbeville and Dompierre-sur-Authie.

== Population ==
Historical population
Year	Pop.	±% p.a.
1968	939	—
1975	908	−0.48%
1982	813	−1.57%
1990	802	−0.17%
1999	742	−0.86%
2007	867	+1.97%
2012	767	−2.42%
2017	730	−0.98%
2023	636	−2.27%
Source: INSEE

== Places of interest ==
- The heritage railway, the Chemin de Fer de la Baie de Somme
- The Chinese cemetery, in the village of Nolette, where 842 Chinese workers are buried. Recruited by the British as part of the Chinese Labour Corps between 1917 and 1919 during and after the First World War, for the most part, they died of Spanish flu.

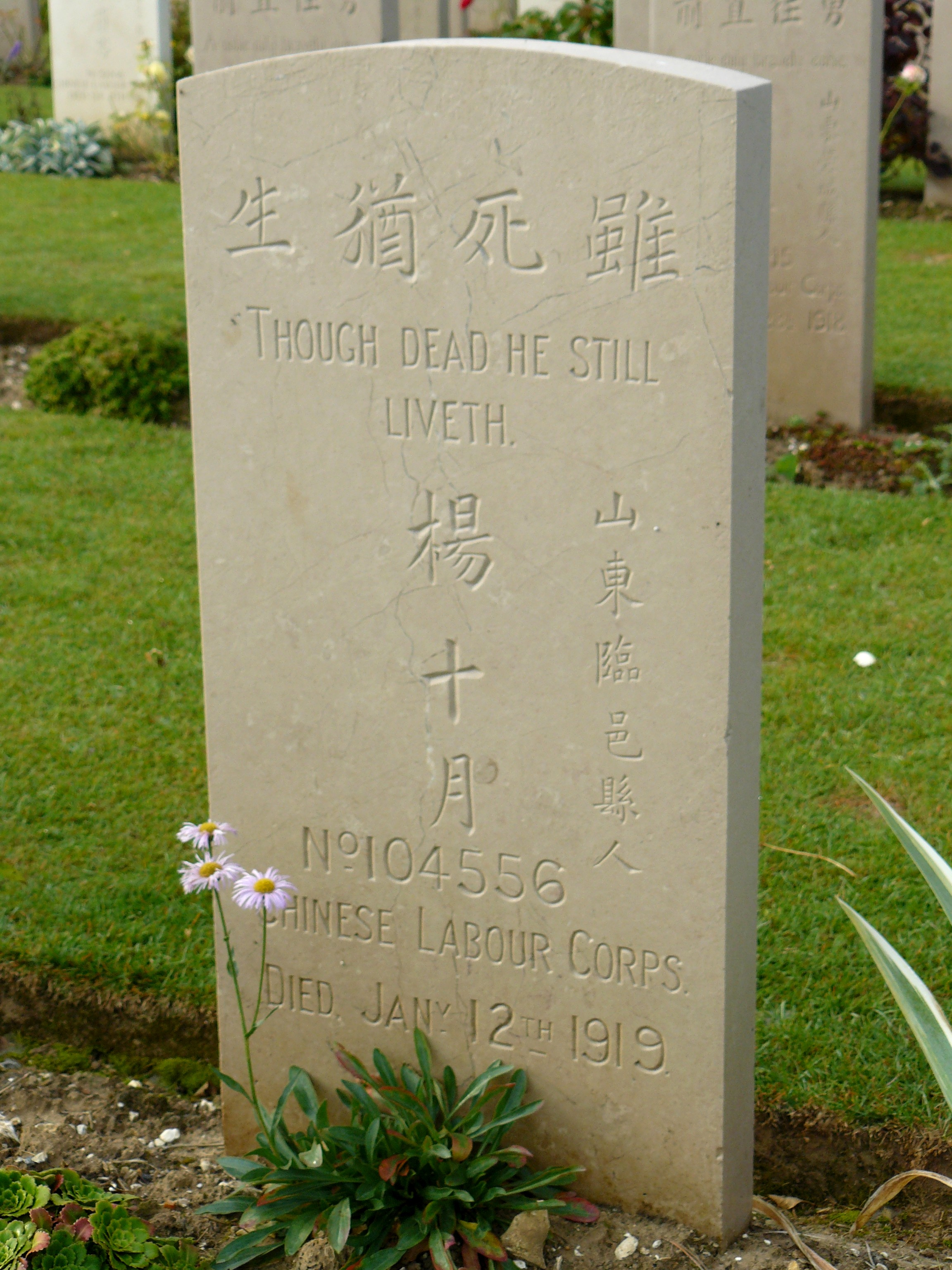
One of the gravestones at Noyelles-sur-Mer

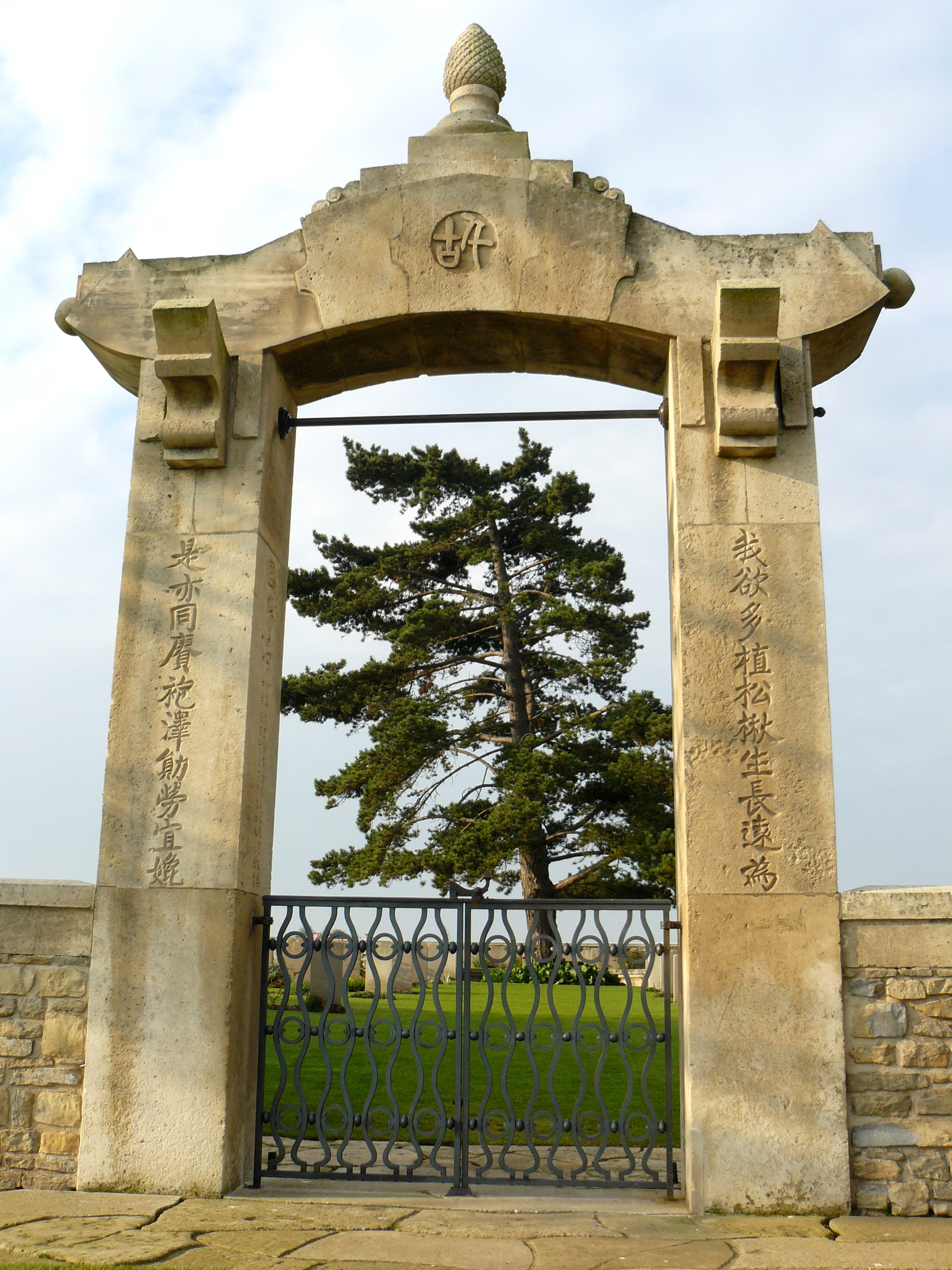
The entrance to the Chinese cemetery at Noyelles-sur-Mer

== See also ==
- Communes of the Somme department
- Chemin de Fer de la Baie de Somme
- Réseau des Bains de Mer
