= Réseau des Bains de Mer =

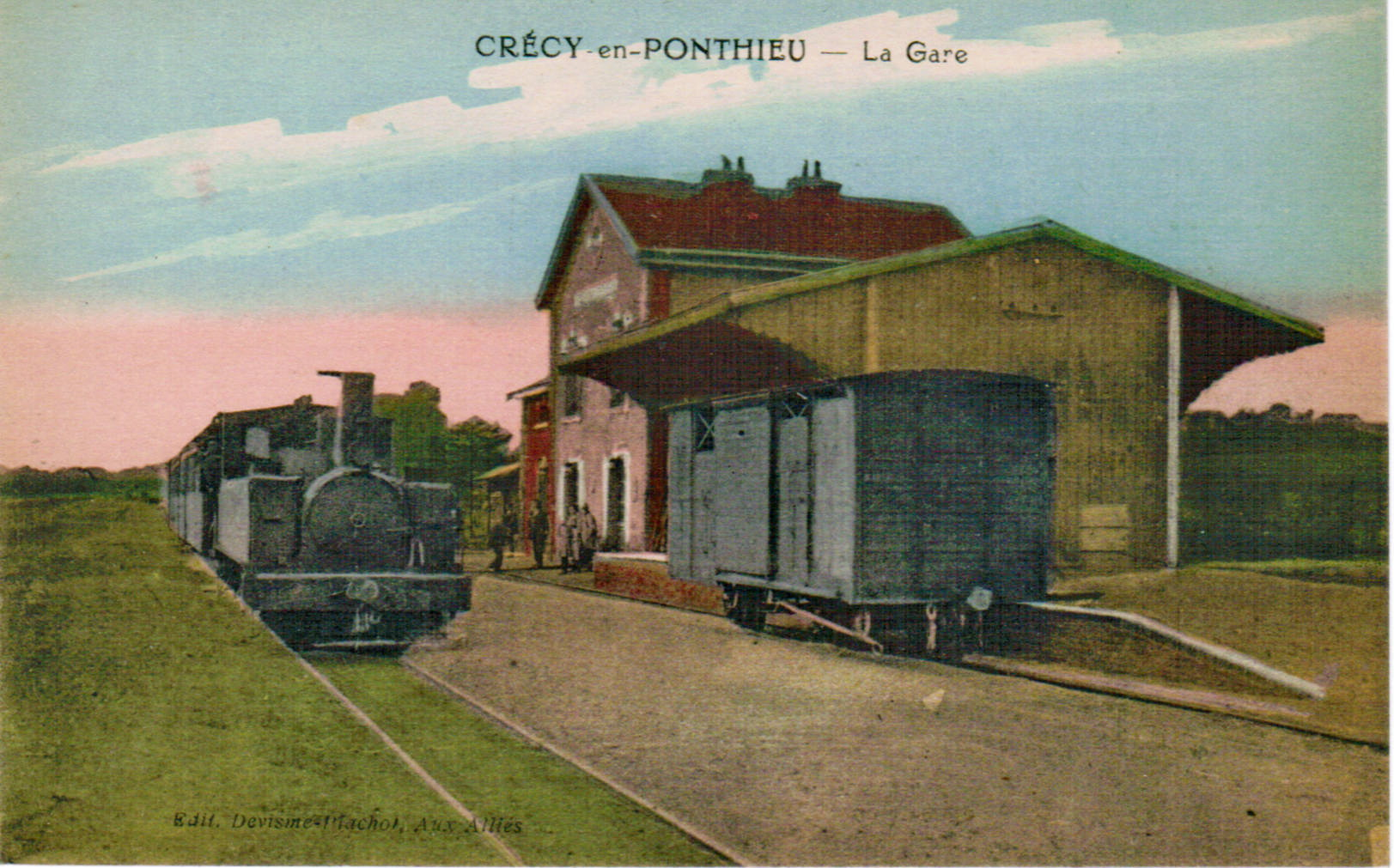
- A train at Crécy-Estrées station

Overview
- Status: Part closed, part in operation as the Chemin de Fer de la Baie de Somme heritage railway
- Locale: Somme, France
- Stations: 26

Service
- Services: 4

History
- Opened: 1 June 1887
- 10 March 1947: Closed to passengers between Noyelles and Crécy Estrées. Closed Abbeville to Forest l'Abbay and Crécy Estrées to Dompierre-sur-Authie.
- 1 February 1951: Closed between Noyelles and Crécy Estrées.

Technical
- Line length: ~68 kilometres (42.25 mi)
- Number of tracks: Single track
- Track gauge: 1,000 mm (3 ft 3 3/8 in) metre gauge
Map of the Réseau des Bains de Mer
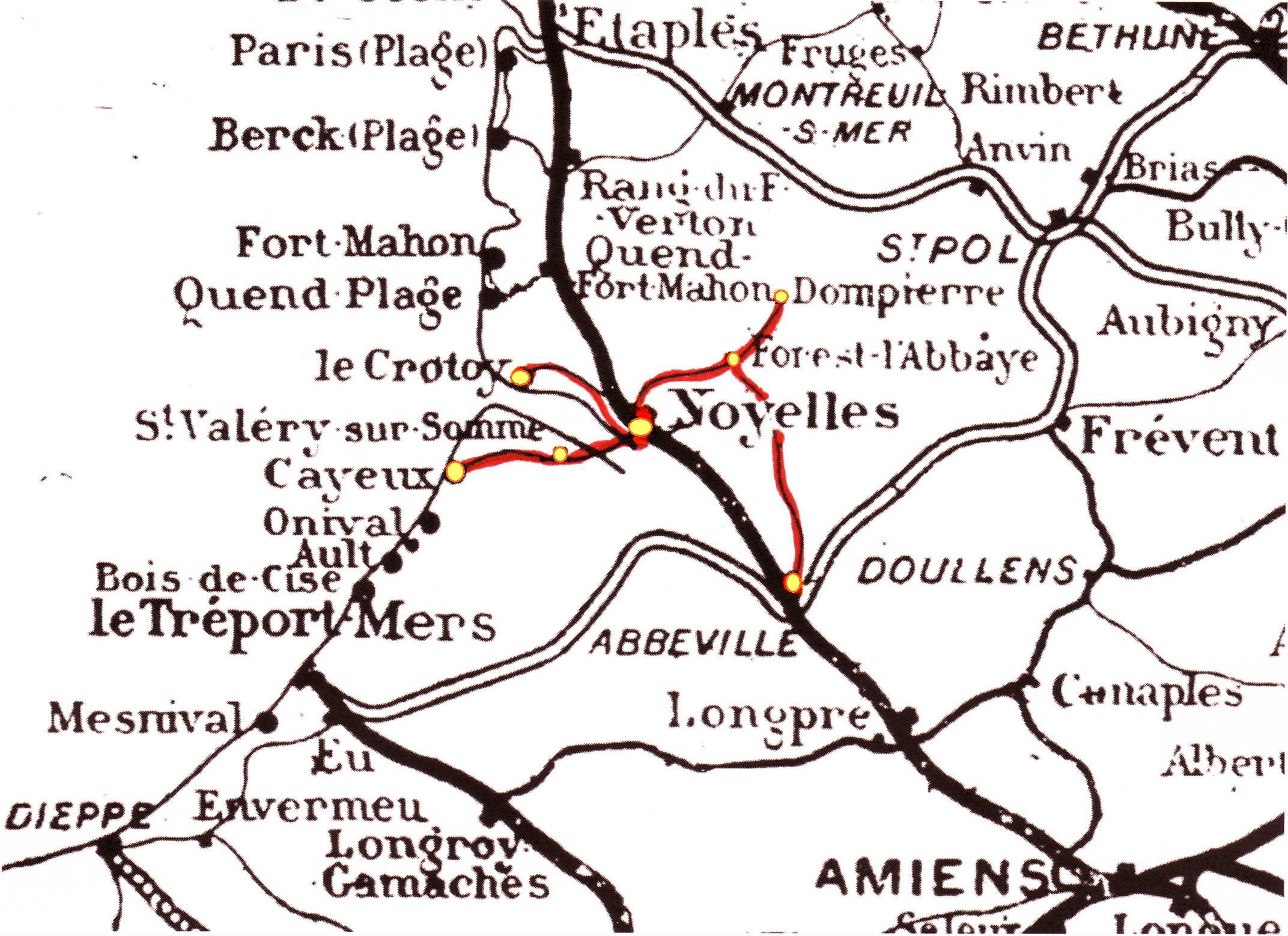
Map showing the Réseau des Bains de Mer

The Réseau des Bains de Mer (French pronunciation: [ʁezo de bɛ̃ də mɛʁ], RBM) was a group of five metre gauge railways centred on Noyelles-sur-Mer, with a total route length of some 68 kilometres (42 mi). It was a part of the Chemins de fer départementaux de la Somme. Three of the lines are still open as the Chemin de Fer de la Baie de Somme heritage line, and are dealt with under that article. This article covers the other two lines, now closed. All the lines were in the Somme department.

The five lines were:-

- Noyelles - Le Crotoy (opened 1 June 1887).
- Noyelles - St. Valery sur Somme (opened 5 June 1858 [Standard gauge], 6 September 1887 [Dual gauge] ).
- St. Valery sur Somme - Cayeux sur Mer (opened 6 September 1887).
- Noyelles - Forest-l'Abbaye (opened 24 August 1892, closed 10 March 1947 [passengers] / 1 February 1951 [freight] ).
- Abbeville - Dompierre-sur-Authie (opened 19 June 1892, closed 10 March 1947 [Abbeville - Forest-l'Abbaye and Crécy Estrées - Dompierre sur Authie, also to passengers between Crécy Estrées and Forest l'Abbaye] / 1 February 1951 [Crécy Estrées - Forest-l'Abbaye] ).

== Background ==
In France, the building of railways was controlled by the Government. This avoided the duplication of routes that was seen in the UK and meant that the large cities and towns were connected. The citizens of the smaller towns and villages also wanted railways to be built to connect them to the network. The departments were given authority to oversee the construction of these minor lines, some of which were built to standard gauge and others were built to metre gauge. The Réseau des Bains de Mer system came under the control of the Somme Department.

== Freight. ==
The main freight carried was sugar beet and phosphates. Sugar beet were collected at the râperie of Crécy-Estrées. Here the raw juice was extracted from the beet. This juice was then sent by pipeline to the sugar factory of Abbeville. The beet were the final traffic carried on this section of the RBM. Phosphates were mined at Forêt du Crécy and sent by rail to St. Valery.

== Noyelles - Forest-l'Abbaye. ==
This line was 11 kilometres (6.8 mi) long. Leaving Noyelles station, it climbed to cross the main Boulogne-Abbeville line. Stations were provided at Sailly-Bray, Sailly-le-Sec, Nouvion-en-Ponthieu and Forest-l'Abbaye, where there was a junction with the Abbeville-Dompierre line.

The line was opened on 24 August 1892, and closed to passengers on 10 March 1947. The line remained open for freight until 1 February 1951. After closure, the line saw occasional use for freight until 1965.

== Stations ==
=== Noyelles-sur-Mer ===
A station was opened at Noyelles in 1847, being on the standard gauge line between Boulogne and Amiens. In 1858 a single track branch opened to St. Valery sur Somme. Metre gauge branches opened to Le Crotoy and Cayeux in 1887, the latter being laid between the rails of the standard gauge branch to St. Valery. The final line to be built to Noyelles was a metre gauge branch to Forest l'Abbaye which opened on 24 August 1892, and closed to passengers on 10 March 1947 and freight on 1 February 1951.

=== Sailly-Bray ===
A station served the villages of Sailly-Saillisel and Bray-sur-Somme.

=== Sailly-le-Sec ===
A station served the village of Sailly-le-Sec.

=== Nouvion-en-Ponthieu ===
A station served the village of Nouvion-en-Ponthieu

- Forest l'Abbaye station will be covered under the Abbeville-Dompierre line.

== Abbeville - Dompierre ==
This line was 31 kilometres (19 mi) long. It ran from the Chemin de Fer du Nord station at Abbeville (North) to Dompierre-sur-Authie, with a junction at Forest-l'Abbaye with the line to Noyelles. There were stations at Abbeville Porte Saint Gilles, Abbeville Porte du Bois, Drucat, Plessiel-Drucat, Canchy-Neuilly, Lamotte-Buleux, Forest-l'Abbaye, Forêt du Crécy, Crécy-Estrées, Wadicourt and Dompierre-sur-Authie. There were plans to extend the line into the Pas de Calais department. In 1892 a line was planned from Dompierre-sur-Authie to Hesdin. It would have been 17-kilometre (10.56 mi) long with intermediate stations at Raye-sur-Authie, Guigny and Lequesnoy. A second line was planned from Dompierre-sur-Authie to Wailly, connecting with the Chemins de fer d'Aire à Fruges et de Rimeux-Gournay à Berck (CF du ARB). The 26-kilometre (16.16 mi) long line would have had intermediate stations at Tortefontaine, Douriez, Saulchoy, Saint-Rémy-au-Bois, Campagne-les-Hesdin, Buire-le-Sec and Bois-Jean. Neither line was built.

The line served mainly small villages with little industry. It opened on 19 June 1892, and closed on 10 March 1947, except the section between Crécy and Forest-l'Abbaye, which remained open to freight until 1 February 1951. The section north of Crécy to Dompierre-sur-Authie saw occasional use for freight until 1956. The section south of Forest-l'Abbaye to Canchy saw occasional use for freight until 1965.

== Stations ==
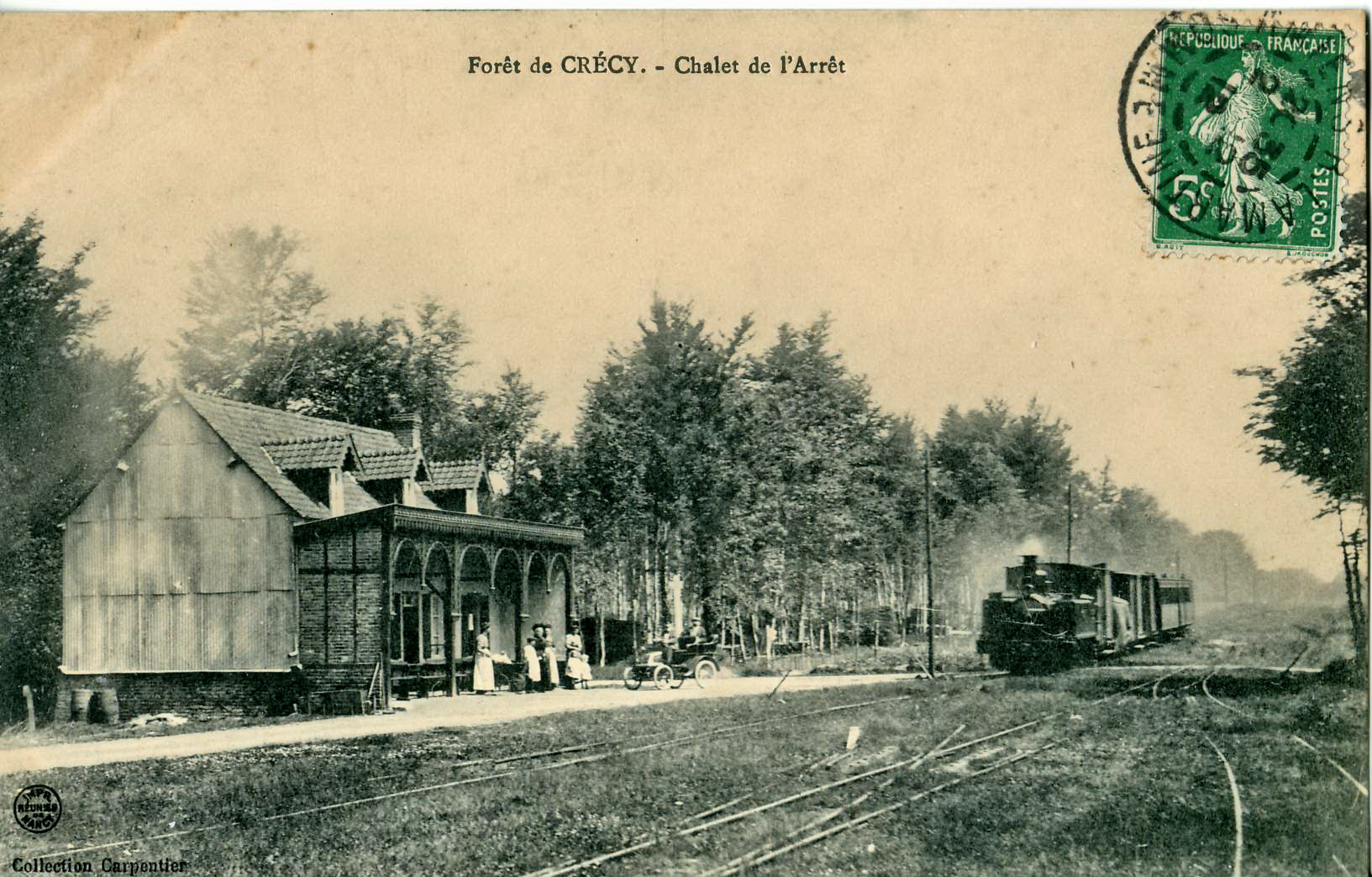
Forêt de Crécy station in 1912

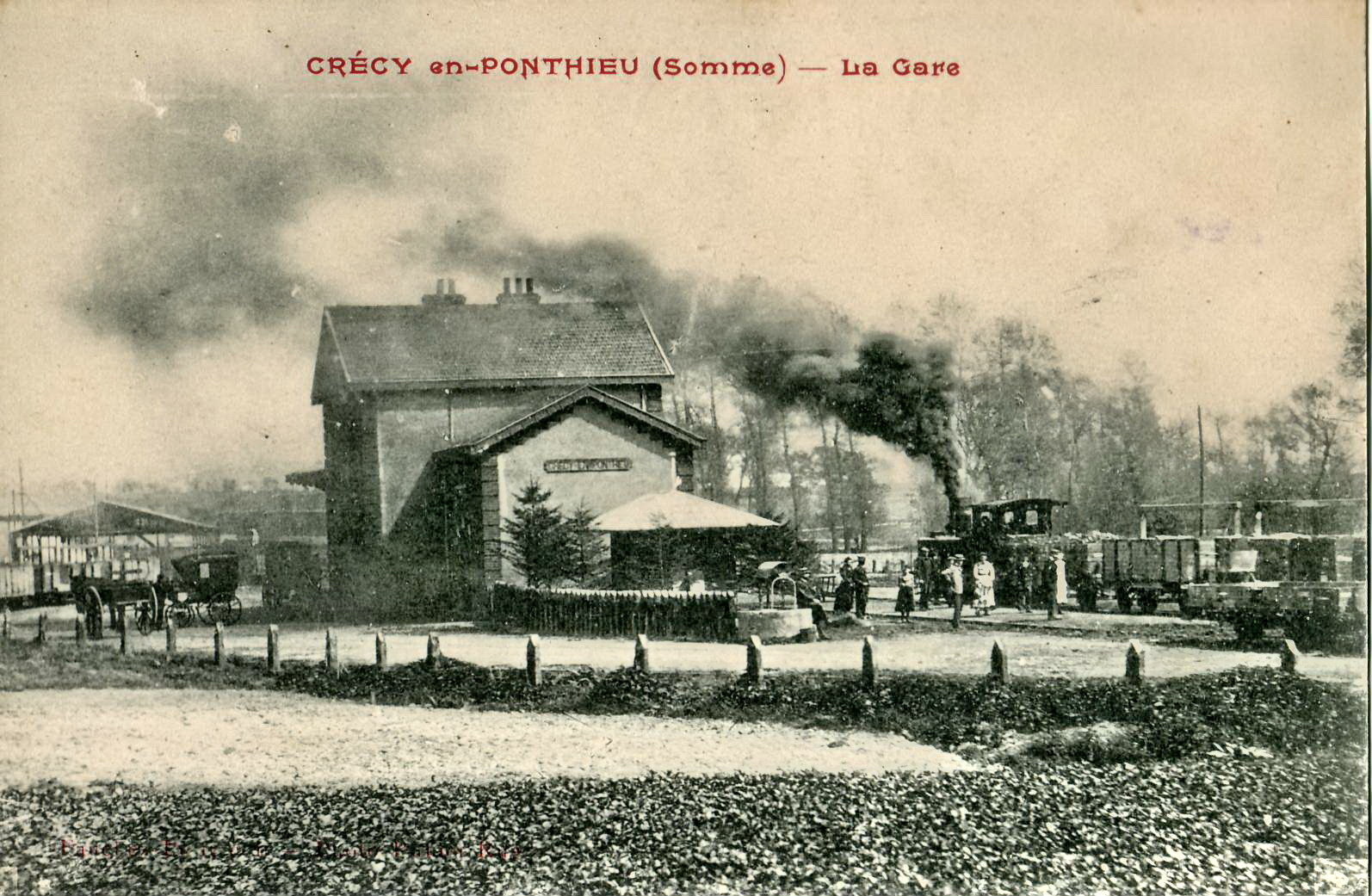
The station at Crécy.

=== Abbeville (Nord) ===
Abbeville was the furthest station south, it was 28 kilometres (17 mi) from Noyelles and 31 kilometres (19 mi) from Dompierre-sur-Authie.

=== Drucat ===
This station served the village of Drucat.

=== Plessiel-Drucat ===
A halt served the hamlet of Le Plessiel, part of the Drucat commune.

=== Canchy-Neuilly ===
This station served the villages of Canchy and Neuilly-l'Hôpital.

=== Lamotte-Buleux ===
A station served the village of Lamotte-Buleux.

=== Forest-l'Abbaye ===
Forest-l'Abbaye was where the line from Noyelles joined the line between Abbeville and Dompierre-sur-Authie. It was 11 kilometres (6.8 mi) from Noyelles.

=== Forêt du Crécy ===
Phosphates were mined locally, and transported to St. Valery by rail.

=== Crécy-Estrées ===
This station served the villages of Crécy-en-Ponthieu and Estrées-lès-Crécy. This was the location of the râperie (from rasp). Sugar beet were collected at surrounding stations and then sent to Crécy. The râperie extracted the raw juice, which was then sent by pipeline to the sugar factory of Abbeville. This traffic continued until 1951.

=== Wadicourt ===
There were two point for the collection of sugar beet here.

=== Dompierre-sur-Authie ===
Dompierre-sur-Authie was the Northern terminus of the line from Abbeville. It was 25 kilometres (16 mi) from Noyelles and 31 kilometres (19 mi) from Abbeville.
