= Le Crotoy =

Le Crotoy Ch'Crotoé (Picard)
- Commune
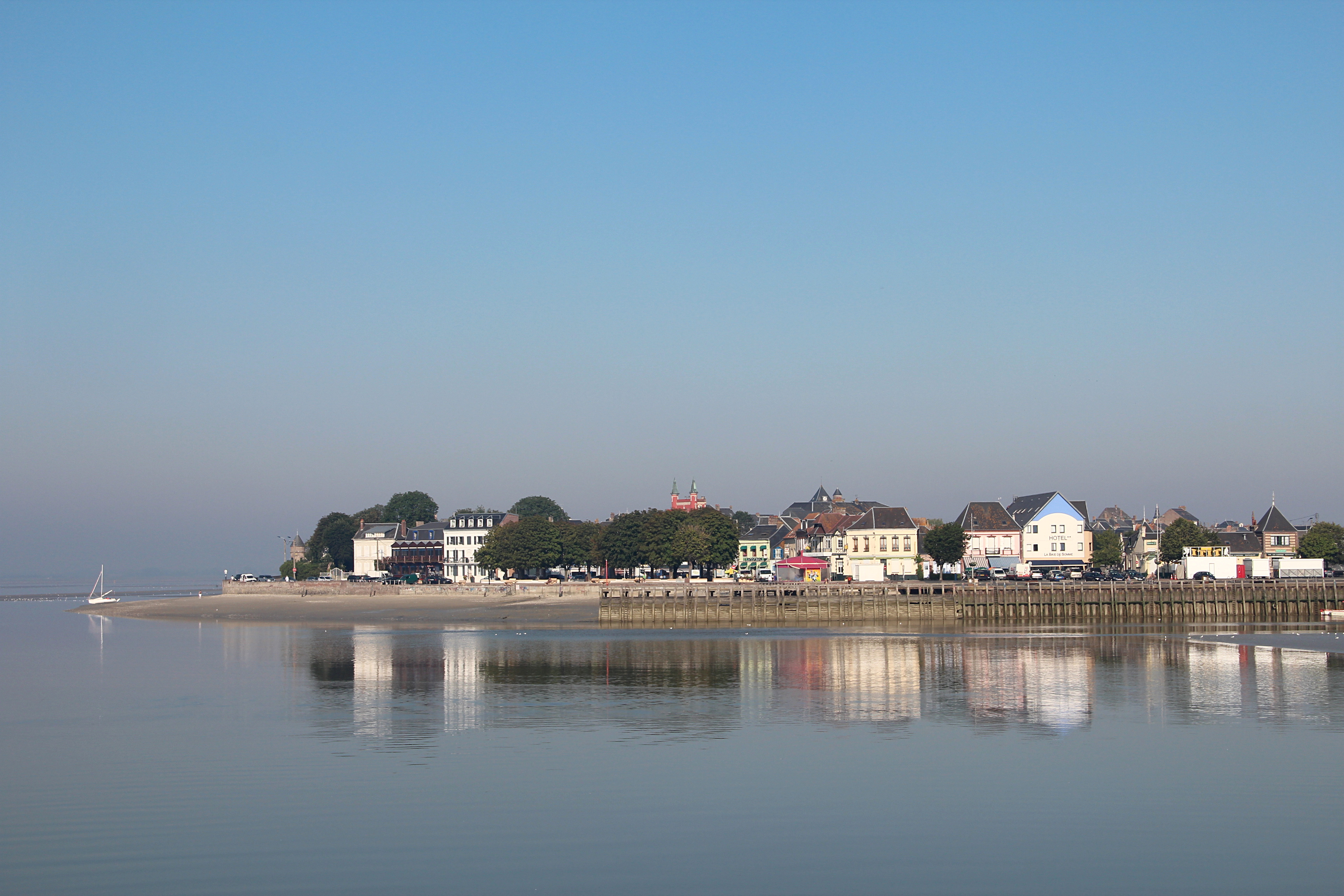
- The Quai Courbet.

- Coat of arms
- Location of Le Crotoy
- Location within France Location within Hauts-de-France
- Coordinates: 50°13′00″N 1°37′33″E
- Country: France
- Region: Hauts-de-France
- Department: Somme
- Arrondissement: Abbeville
- Canton: Rue
- Intercommunality: CC Ponthieu-Marquenterre

Government
  - Mayor (2026–32): Philippe Évrard
- Area^{1}: 16.32 km^{2} (6.30 sq mi)
- Elevation: 6 m (20 ft)
- Highest elevation: 14 m (46 ft)
- Lowest elevation: 2 m (6.6 ft)
- Population (2023): 1,958
  - Density: 120.0/km^{2} (310.7/sq mi)
- Time zone: UTC+01:00 (CET)
  - Summer (DST): UTC+02:00 (CEST)
- INSEE/Postal code: 80228 /80550
- ^{1} French Land Register data, which excludes lakes, ponds, glaciers > 1 km^{2} (0.386 sq mi or 247 acres) and river estuaries.

Le Crotoy (French pronunciation: [lə kʁɔtwa]; Picard: Ch'Crotoé) is a commune in the Somme department in Hauts-de-France in northern France. The inhabitants are known as Crotellois.

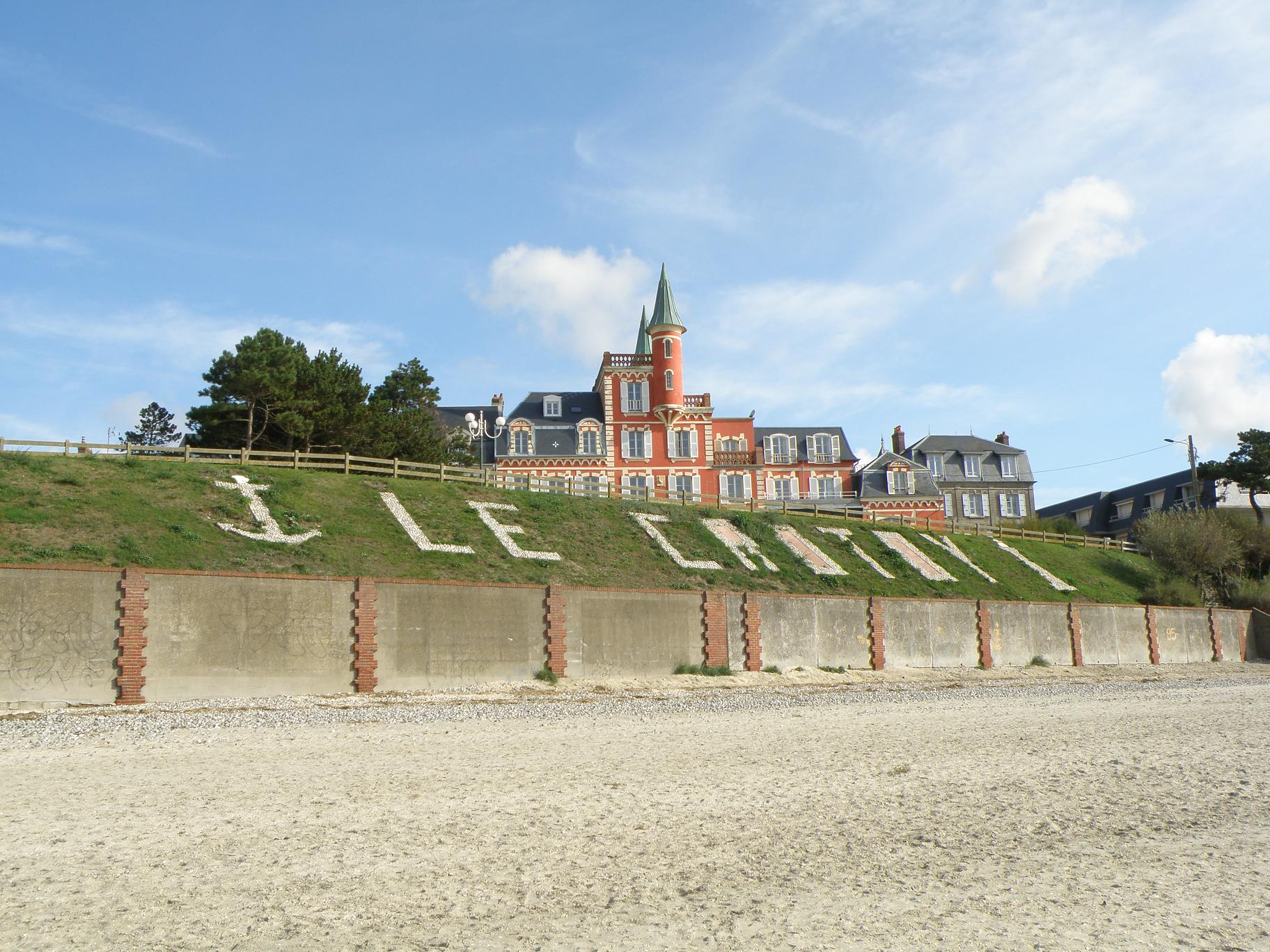
The town seen from the beach at low tide.

== History ==
Isabella of France, queen consort of England, and her son (later Edward III of England) embarked from Crotoy for Holland and then England in 1326, in order to overthrow her husband, and his father, Edward II. During the Hundred Years' War the town was alternately under English and French control. Edward III stayed in Crotoy and in 1340 built a very important fortress. Besieged by the English, Crotoy, the last French position in the Bay of the Somme, surrendered on March 1, 1424. After the Battle of Verneuil, Jean II, Duke of Alençon was interned there for three years. Joan of Arc was imprisoned there before being taken to Rouen for trial. During these troubled times, Crotoy was the place of residence of a governor and a garrison. Jacques d'Harcourt was the most famous governor: he defended Crotoy boldly and courageously against the Anglo-Burgundian armies. An eponymous street pays homage to him in the city center.

During the wars of religion, Crotoy took the side of Henri de Navarre. By an edict of 1594, Henri IV relieved the Crotellois from taxes. He stayed in the town on April 18, 1596.

In 1674, under the terms of the Treaty of Aix-la-Chapelle, the castle of Crotoy was destroyed.

Le Crotoy was also famous at the beginning of 20th century in the history of aviation, as the site of the Caudron brothers flying school.

== Geography ==
Le Crotoy is situated on the D143 and D71 crossroads, on the eastern side of the Baie de Somme, some 10 miles (16 km) northwest of Abbeville.
Today, the town is a seaside resort whose beach is one of its main assets. It is also close to Marquentera (Park of Marquenterre), an area with a number of lakes, marshes and habitat for flora and fauna. The beach is unusual for northern French beaches in that it faces south. In terms of wildlife, the bay supports a population of seals and shags.

== Places of interest ==
- The preserved railway, the Chemin de Fer de la Baie de Somme
- Le port and town of Crotoy
- St Peter's Church

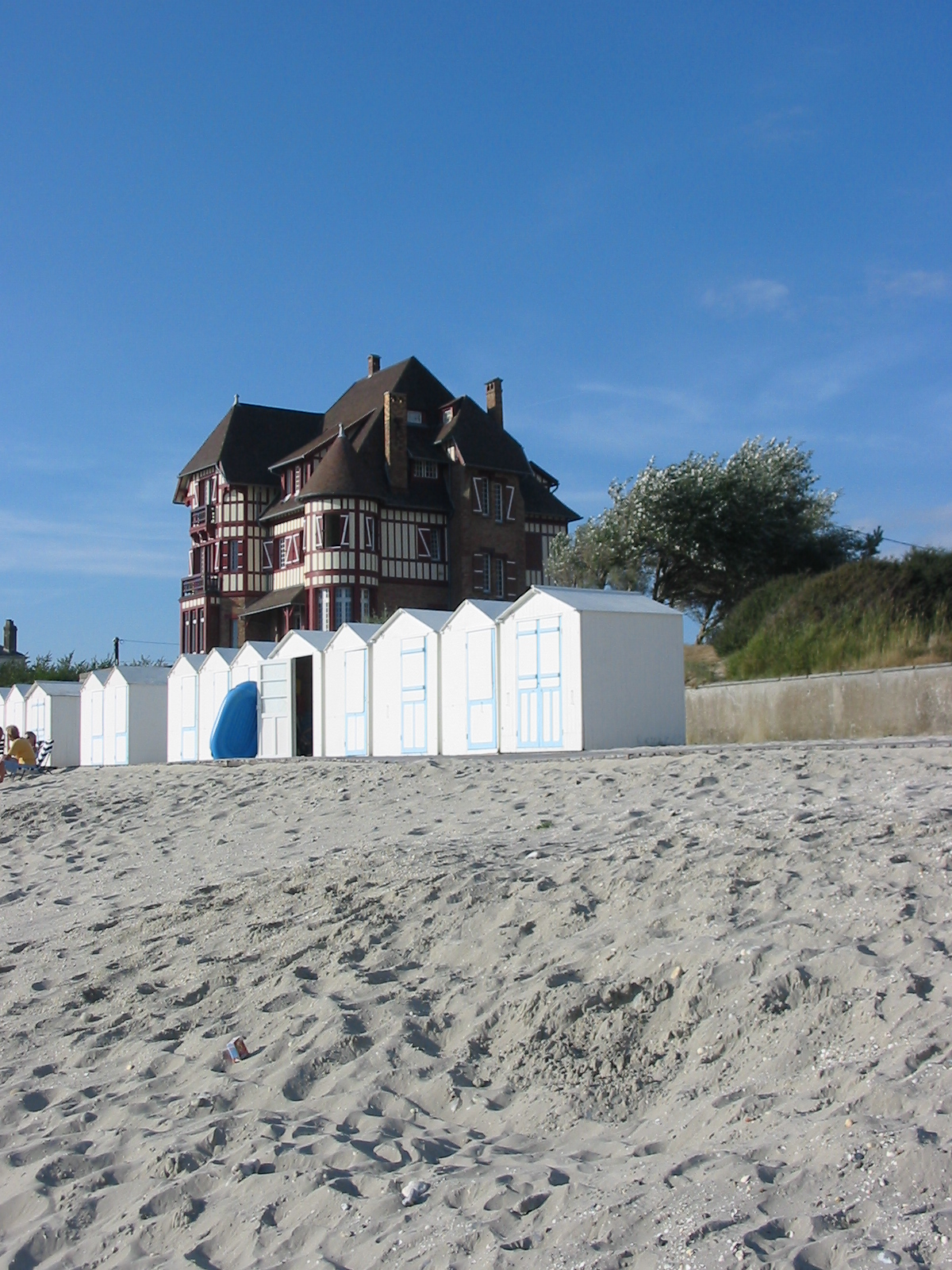
Beach huts at Le Crotoy

== Activities ==
There are numerous restaurants in the village, and it is well equipped with shops and a petrol station. Bed & Breakfast accommodation is also available.
Le Crotoy is one terminus of the narrow gauge "Chemin de Fer de la Baie de Somme" (Somme Bay Railway), which is now largely a tourist attraction. Running around the entire length of the bay, this railway connects Le Crotoy with Noyelles-sur-Mer, Saint-Valery-sur-Somme, and Cayeux-sur-Mer and the sands at Brighton Plage.
Main line trains to Paris take about 2 hours and cost about 48Euro return for an adult. They run from the nearby (15 mins by car) station of Noyelles-sur-Mer, which is also a station on the "Chemin de Fer de la Baie de Somme" narrow gauge railway.

The bay of the river Somme has tides in that they are both fast and have a high rise and fall. At low tide it is possible to walk across the sand and mud flats from Le Crotoy to Saint-Valery-sur-Somme. Care needs to be taken as the tides come in very quickly.

== Occupations ==
Fishing predominates, both for seafish and shellfish (mostly cockles and mussels) and from the coastal saltmarshes, samphire and sea-aster. Hunting and shooting, for both game and wildfowl provides food for locals and visitors alike. Sheep-rearing, on salty pastures, produces a unique flavour. The sheep of the Somme Bay have been credited ‘appellation d'origine contrôlée (AOC)’ .

== Personalities ==
Le Crotoy has had lengthy visits from some famous figures of French history: Joan of Arc (who was imprisoned there), Jules Verne (who wrote his 1870 novel Twenty Thousand Leagues Under the Seas here), the perfumer Guerlain who has created in regard of the special shades of blue, purple, violet which cover bay at down his well-known perfume, "L'Heure Bleue". Several painters as Toulouse-Lautrec, Paul Signac, Pierre Risch, and the novelist Colette had also been charmed by Le Crotoy.

== Population ==
Historical population
Year	Pop.	±% p.a.
1968	2,412	—
1975	2,429	+0.10%
1982	2,347	−0.49%
1990	2,440	+0.49%
1999	2,439	−0.00%
2007	2,314	−0.66%
2012	2,138	−1.57%
2017	2,012	−1.21%
2023	1,958	−0.45%
Source: INSEE

== See also ==
- Communes of the Somme department
- Réseau des Bains de Mer
- Chemin de Fer de la Baie de Somme
