= Crécy-en-Ponthieu =

- Commune
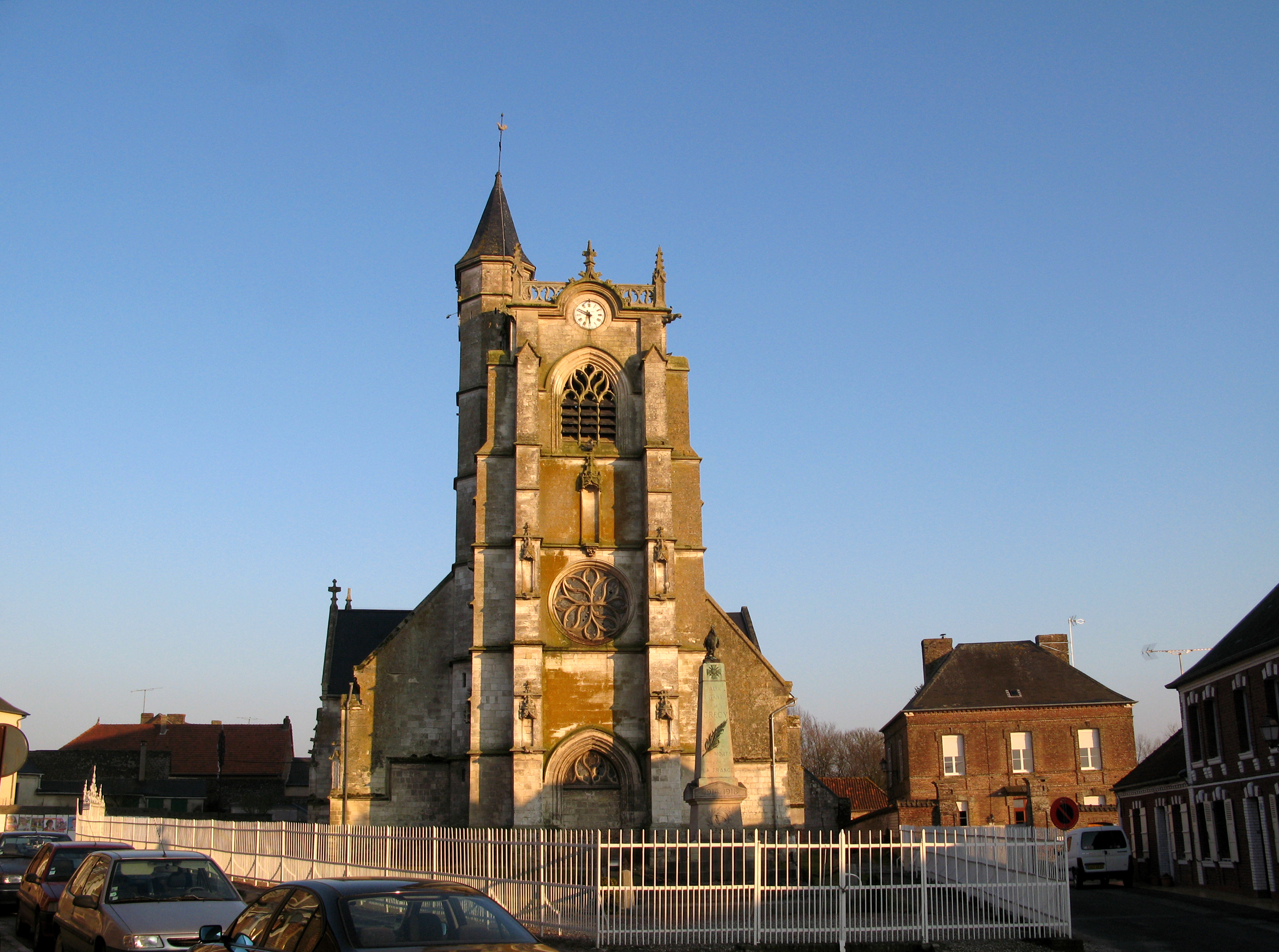
- Church of Crécy-en-Ponthieu

- Coat of arms
- Location of Crécy-en-Ponthieu
- Location within France Location within Hauts-de-France
- Coordinates: 50°15′11″N 1°53′02″E
- Country: France
- Region: Hauts-de-France
- Department: Somme
- Arrondissement: Abbeville
- Canton: Rue
- Intercommunality: CC Ponthieu-Marquenterre

Government
  - Mayor (2020–2026): Gérard Lheureux
- Area^{1}: 56.55 km^{2} (21.83 sq mi)
- Elevation: 36 m (118 ft)
- Highest elevation: 82 m (269 ft)
- Lowest elevation: 19 m (62 ft)
- Population (2023): 1,376
  - Density: 24.33/km^{2} (63.02/sq mi)
- Time zone: UTC+01:00 (CET)
  - Summer (DST): UTC+02:00 (CEST)
- INSEE/Postal code: 80222 /80150
- ^{1} French Land Register data, which excludes lakes, ponds, glaciers > 1 km^{2} (0.386 sq mi or 247 acres) and river estuaries.

Crécy-en-Ponthieu (French: [kʁe.si.ɑ̃.pɔ̃.tjø]), known in archaic English as Cressy, is a commune located south of Calais in the northern French department of Somme. It gives its name to Crécy Forest, which starts about two kilometres to the south-west of the town and is one of the largest in the north of France. A small river, the Maye, runs through the town.

== History ==
Crécy-en-Ponthieu is best known as the site of the Battle of Crécy in 1346, one of the earliest and most important battles of the Hundred Years' War. There are other significant historical links. The Chaussée Brunehaut, which passed within two miles (3.2 km) of the town, is the Roman road from Paris and Amiens to Boulogne, and is still visible and walkable today.

The town lends its name to a popular carrot soup known as potage Crécy.

== Airfield ==
The British built an airfield in Crécy to provide air support before the fall of France in 1940. During the Battle of France, the plan seems to have been to deploy RAF squadrons of Bristol Blenheim light bombers there, but it is not clear how intensively the airfield was used. In the confused days of mid-May 1940 one squadron that was ordered to deploy there did not do so due to the absence of any military protection. It is most notable for its occupation by the German Luftwaffe, with Gruppe Zerstörergeschwader 26 of Messerschmitt Bf 110s stationed there from May 1940 until November 1940 when, after the end of the Battle of Britain, the Gruppe was withdrawn to Germany to rest and re-equip. Several other squadrons came and went, including some Messerschmitt Bf 109s. The entrance to the airfield is still visible on the left of the D12 road from Crécy to Ligescourt, midway between the two. Some fortified installations are also visible, hidden beneath trees on various sides of the airfield.

== Museum ==
The Crécy museum holds a collection of items, displayed over two rooms and a passageway. The collection includes information about the battle of Crecy as well as various items from the Second World War, pre-historic material and geological specimens.

== Railway ==
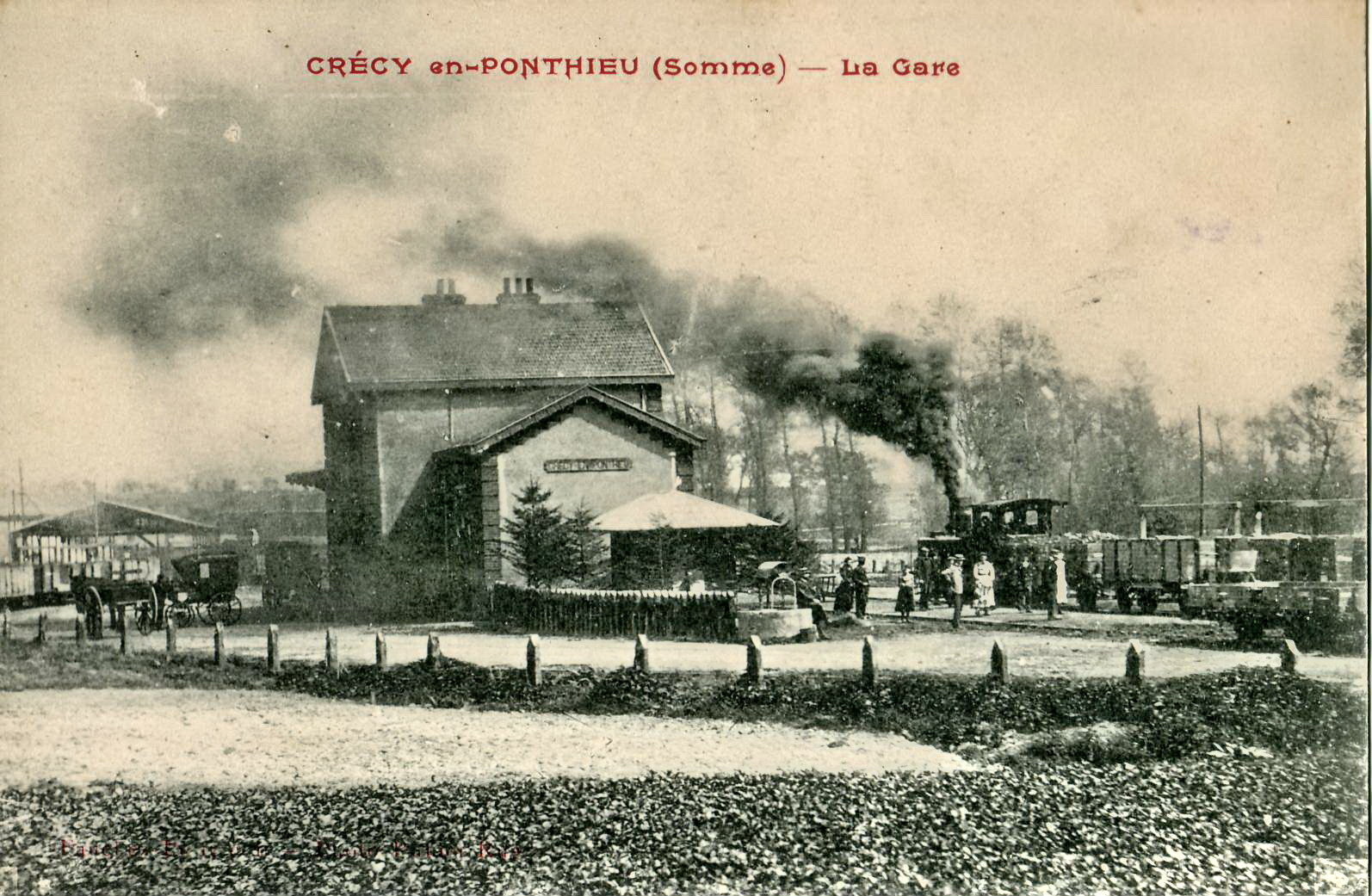
The station shown on an old postcard

There was a station (Crécy-Estrées) on a branch of the Réseau des Bains de Mer which ran between Abbeville and Dompierre-sur-Authie. It opened on 19 June 1892 and closed to passengers on 10 March 1947 and freight on 1 February 1951.
