= Cayeux-sur-Mer =

- Commune
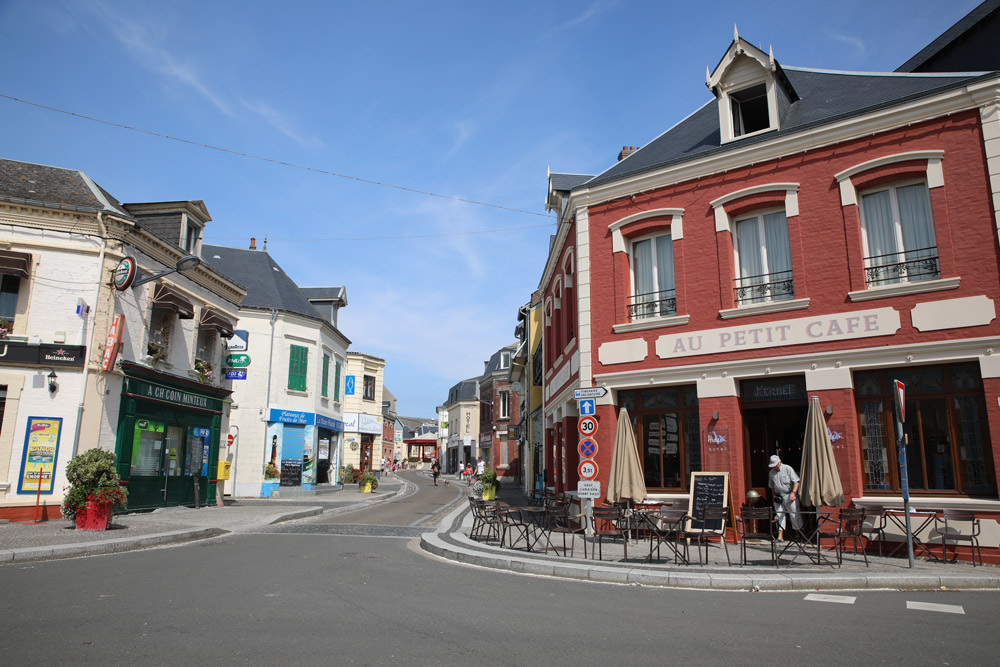
- Marechal Foch Street Cayeux-sur-Mer

- Coat of arms
- Location of Cayeux-sur-Mer
- Location within France Location within Hauts-de-France
- Coordinates: 50°10′54″N 1°29′45″E
- Country: France
- Region: Hauts-de-France
- Department: Somme
- Arrondissement: Abbeville
- Canton: Friville-Escarbotin
- Intercommunality: CA Baie de Somme

Government
  - Mayor (2020–2026): Jean-Paul Lecomte
- Area^{1}: 26.29 km^{2} (10.15 sq mi)
- Elevation: 2 m (6.6 ft)
- Highest elevation: 15 m (49 ft)
- Lowest elevation: 0 m (0 ft)
- Population (2023): 2,316
  - Density: 88.09/km^{2} (228.2/sq mi)
- Time zone: UTC+01:00 (CET)
  - Summer (DST): UTC+02:00 (CEST)
- INSEE/Postal code: 80182 /80410
- ^{1} French Land Register data, which excludes lakes, ponds, glaciers > 1 km^{2} (0.386 sq mi or 247 acres) and river estuaries.

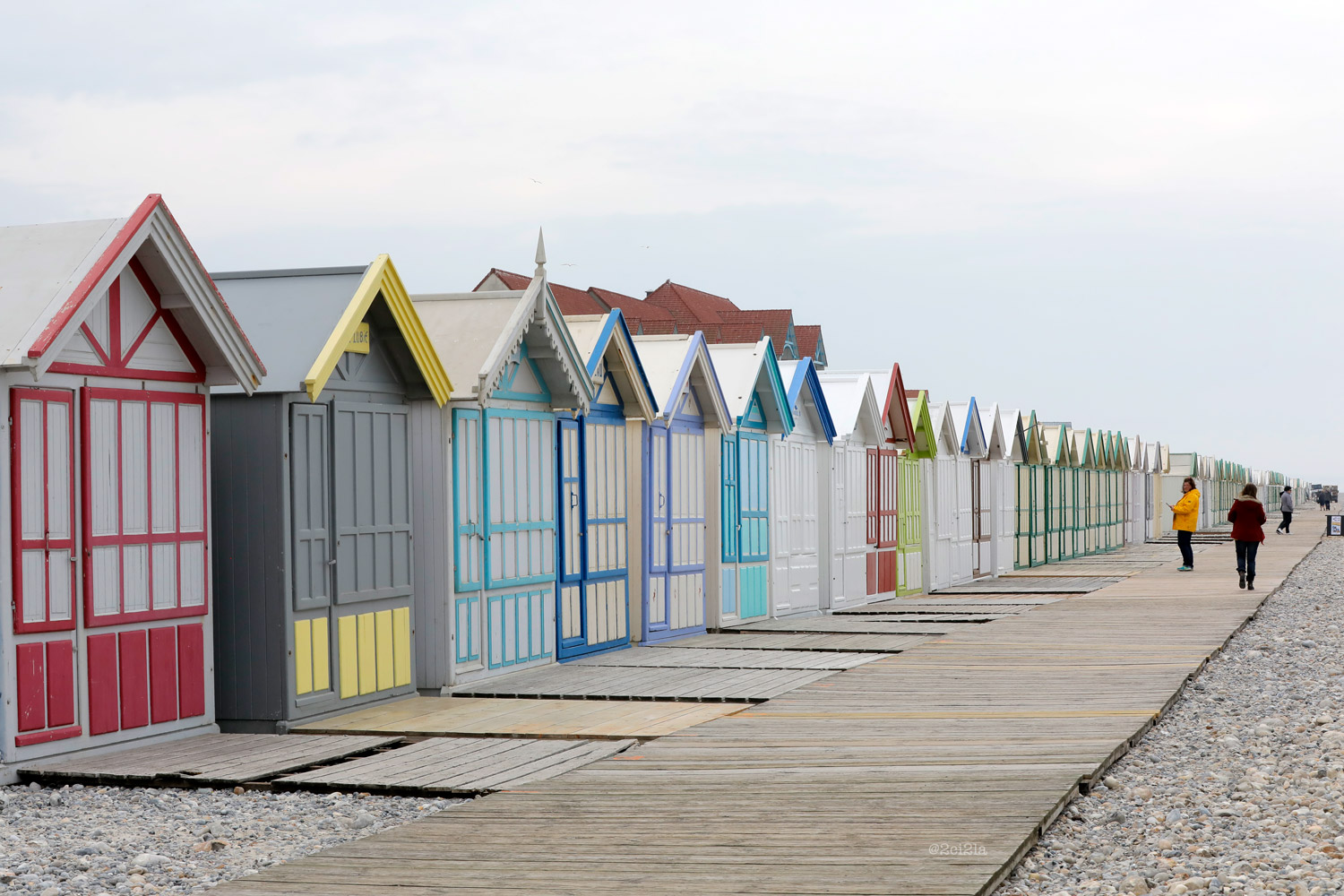
Beach cabins on the seafront in Cayeux-sur-Mer

Cayeux-sur-Mer (French pronunciation: [kajø syʁ mɛʁ], literally Cayeux on Sea; Picard: Tchéyeu-su-Mér) is a resort town in the Somme department in Hauts-de-France in northern France. The town is part of the Baie de Somme - Picardie maritime regional natural park project.

Its inhabitants are called the Cayolais.

== Geography ==
The commune is a seaside town, situated on the D102 road, some 14 miles (23 km) northwest of Abbeville.

The town of Cayeux-sur-Mer is located on the Picardy coast, in the natural region of Marquenterre, south of the Baie de Somme, 16 miles west of Abbeville as the crow flies. It is bordered by the English Channel to the west. The neighboring municipalities are Lanchères, Brutelles, Pendé, Vaudricourt and Woignarue.

The nearest cities to Cayeux-sur-Mer are Amiens (41 mi), Lille (75 mi) and Le Havre (75 mi).

== Population ==
Historical population
Year	Pop.	±% p.a.
1968	2,750	—
1975	2,862	+0.57%
1982	2,649	−1.10%
1990	2,856	+0.94%
1999	2,781	−0.30%
2007	2,781	+0.00%
2012	2,635	−1.07%
2017	2,477	−1.23%
2023	2,316	−1.11%
Source: INSEE

== Places of interest ==
- The boardwalk (quite famous and probably the longest of Europe), with 438 cabins (as of summer 2019)
- The station of the preserved railway, the Chemin de Fer de la Baie de Somme
- The remains of the lighthouse, built in 1835, destroyed in August 1944 by the Germans
- "Benoît Champy", a 19th-century lifeboat that one can visit (Intersection Boulevard General Sizaire - Rue de la Halle)
- Woodwork decorating the marriage room of the town hall, that originate from a former church
- The largest seal colony in France

=== Resort ===
Cayeux-sur-Mer is a large seaside resort with its beach lined with characteristic cabins. The boardwalk, lined with around 400 colorful cabins and 2 km long, offers a pleasant setting for walking and relaxation. It is considered the longest in Europe. Further north is Le Hourdel, a small fishing port in the Bay of Somme. It allows boats to reach the estuary and has been home to a fishing port since 183066.

The Maison de la baie de Somme et de l'oiseau is located between the town and Saint-Valery-sur-Somme. There are nearly 250 species of migratory birds as well as seals in their natural environment.

=== Canoe Benoit-Champy ===
The Benoît-Champy canoe is a 19th-century lifeboat. It has been classified since May 21, 1992 as a Historic Monument. The canoe shelter has been listed since July 25, 2006 as a Historic Monument.

=== Cayeux-sur-Mer-Brighton-Plage Station ===
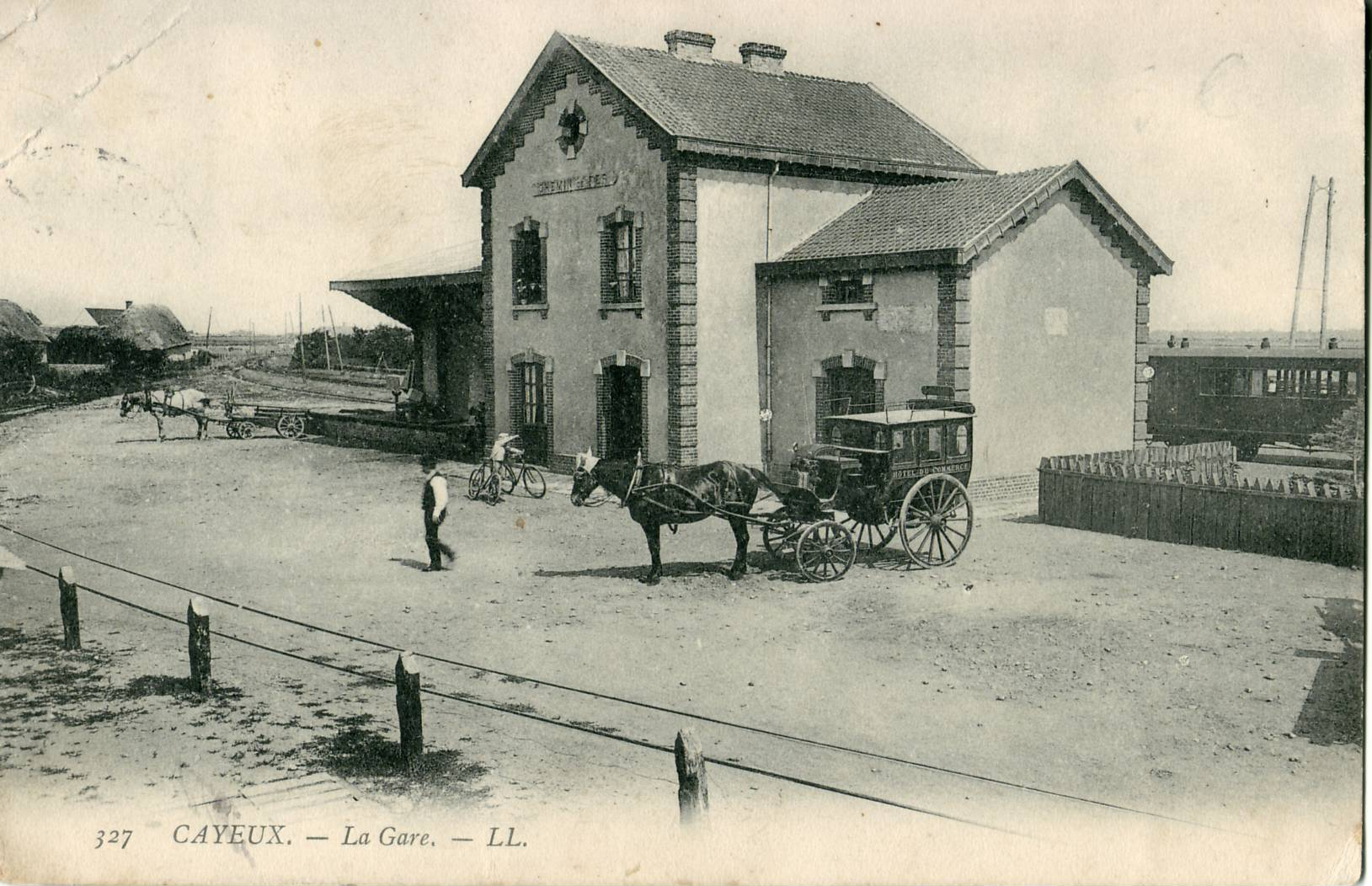
Cayeux railway station

The town is at the end of the tourist line of the Somme Bay Railway linking Le Crotoy - Noyelles-sur-Mer - Saint-Valery-sur-Somme and Cayeux-sur-Mer. Cayeux-sur-Mer-Brighton-Plage station is located south of the town.

=== Town hall ===
The town hall of Cayeux-sur-Mer is a brick building with openings framed in white stone. It is built on two levels. The second level of the central part is decorated with a balcony with wrought iron gate. It is decorated with a pediment with a clock. A pinnacle lies at the top of the roof.

=== Lighthouse ===
The Cayeux lighthouse was commissioned in September 1951, the old one having been destroyed by German troops on August 31, 1944. It is 28 m high.

=== St. Peter's Church ===
The current church of Cayeux-sur-Mer dates from August 3, 1902 and its organs from 191369. It has remarkable stained glass windows and statues.

== See also ==
- Communes of the Somme department
- Réseau des Bains de Mer

== Bibliography ==
- Fossier, Robert (1968). La terre et les hommes en Picardie jusqu'à la fin du XIIIe siècle. Paris: Béatrice-Nauwelaerts.
- Porčić, Nebojša (2021). "Documents of Mary of Cayeux concerning grants to the Abbey of Dommartin and an agreement with the king of England". Initial: A Review of Medieval Studies. 9: 181–208.
