= Dompierre-sur-Authie =

- Commune
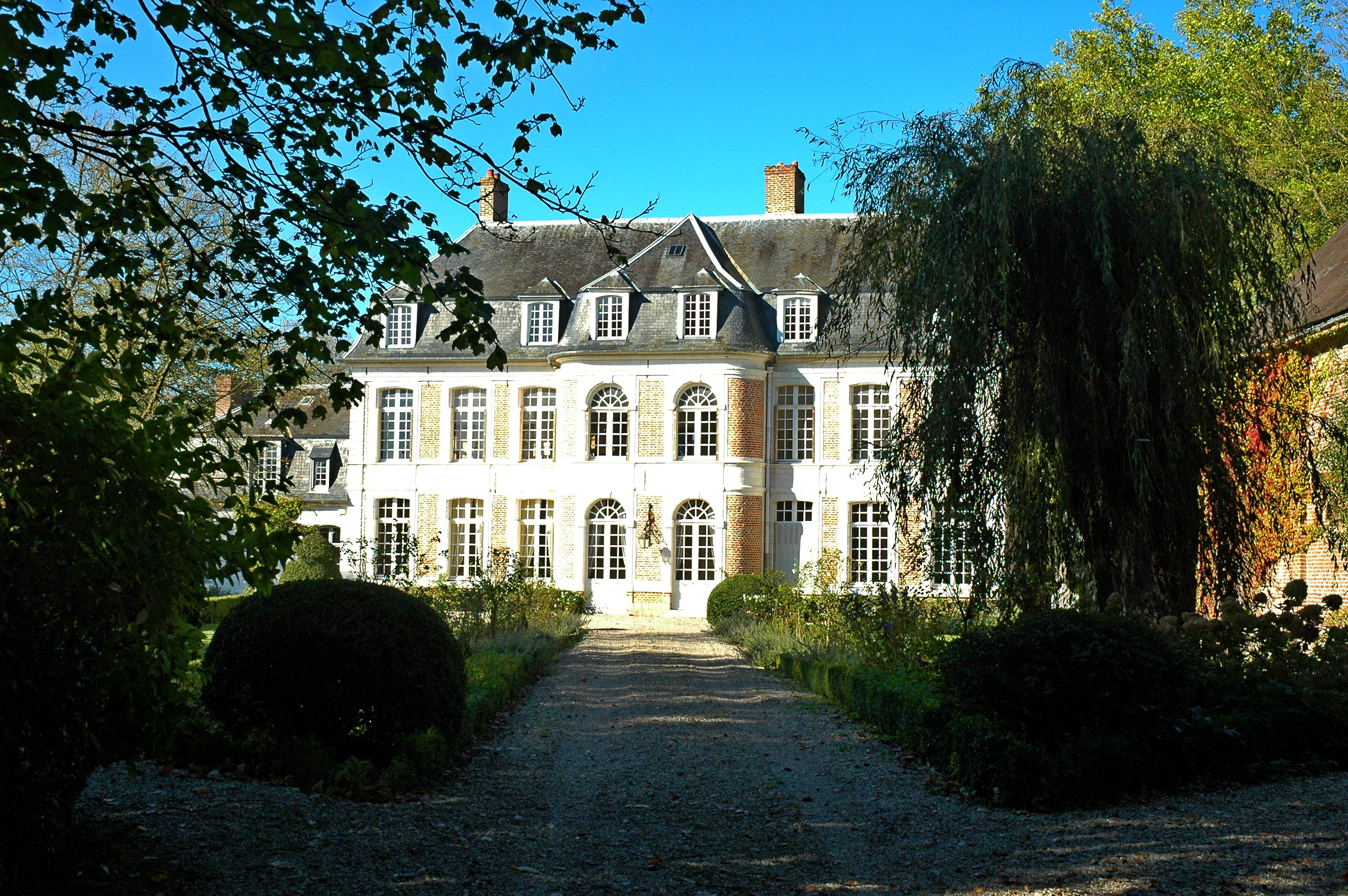
- The chateau of Dompierre-sur-Authie

- Coat of arms
- Location of Dompierre-sur-Authie
- Location within France Location within Hauts-de-France
- Coordinates: 50°18′13″N 1°55′09″E
- Country: France
- Region: Hauts-de-France
- Department: Somme
- Arrondissement: Abbeville
- Canton: Rue
- Intercommunality: CC Ponthieu-Marquenterre

Government
  - Mayor (2020–2026): Olivier Gerard
- Area^{1}: 22.73 km^{2} (8.78 sq mi)
- Elevation: 18 m (59 ft)
- Highest elevation: 101 m (331 ft)
- Lowest elevation: 12 m (39 ft)
- Population (2023): 417
  - Density: 18.3/km^{2} (47.5/sq mi)
- Time zone: UTC+01:00 (CET)
  - Summer (DST): UTC+02:00 (CEST)
- INSEE/Postal code: 80248 /80150
- ^{1} French Land Register data, which excludes lakes, ponds, glaciers > 1 km^{2} (0.386 sq mi or 247 acres) and river estuaries.

Dompierre-sur-Authie (French pronunciation: [dɔ̃pjɛʁ syʁ oti], literally Dompierre on Authie; Picard: Dompierre-su-Eutie) is a commune in the Somme department in Hauts-de-France in northern France.

It is slowly depopulating like most of the countryside towns of this region, with the last shop and last hairdresser in the village having closed in the 1990s. Nevertheless, there is a strong identity and social life in the town, which retains its own primary school.

== Geography ==
The commune is situated on the D119 road, on the banks of the river Authie, the department border with the Pas-de-Calais, some 17 miles (27 km) north of Abbeville. The railway line, part of the Réseau des Bains de Mer system opened on 19 June 1892 and closed on 10 March 1947. Dompierre-sur-Authie was the northern terminus of the branch from Abbeville. The station is still standing and recognisable as such, though it is now a private dwelling.

== History ==
There are two buildings in the town which are described as chateaux. The town is mentioned (though its name is misspelled) in the Appendix of Heinz Guderian's memoirs 'Panzer Leader', and it is clear that Guderian moved his units through Dompierre on 22 May 1940 and briefly had his HQ stationed there when moving from Abbeville in the direction of Montreuil-sur-Mer.

== Population ==
Historical population
Year	Pop.	±% p.a.
1968	578	—
1975	559	−0.48%
1982	526	−0.87%
1990	436	−2.32%
1999	404	−0.84%
2007	416	+0.37%
2012	423	+0.33%
2017	401	−1.06%
2023	417	+0.65%
Source: INSEE

== See also ==
- Communes of the Somme department
- Réseau des Bains de Mer
- Chemin de Fer de la Baie de Somme
