= Pierre-François Levasseur =

Pierre-François Levasseur, called "the older" (11 March 1753 – 23 December 1815) was a French classical cellist.

== Biography ==
Born in Abbeville, Levasseur was initially destined for the priesthood, Levasseur studied to enter the orders. At eighteen he renounced the ecclesiastical state to become a musician. For three months he received lessons from an obscure master named Belleval, and then studied the cello alone.

Arriving in Paris around 1782, he received a few lessons Duport the older, of whom he imitated the manner and acquired the fine quality of sound. In 1789 he played concertos by Duport the younger at the concert spirituel. Later heperformed in the orchestra of the Théâtre Feydeau. He entered the opera orchestra in 1785 and obtained his retirement pension in 1815 after thirty years of service and at the age of sixty-eight. He died soon after.

== Compositions ==
- Six duos pour deux violoncelles, op. I, Paris, Leduc
- Six duos pour deux violoncelles, second book; Paris, Leduc

== Sources ==
- François-Joseph Fétis, Arthur Pougin, Biographie universelle des musiciens et bibliographie générale de la musique, Paris, Firmin-Didot, vol.5, 1881, (pp. 289–90).
