= Hôtel de Ville, Abbeville =

Town hall in Abbeville, France

Hôtel de Ville
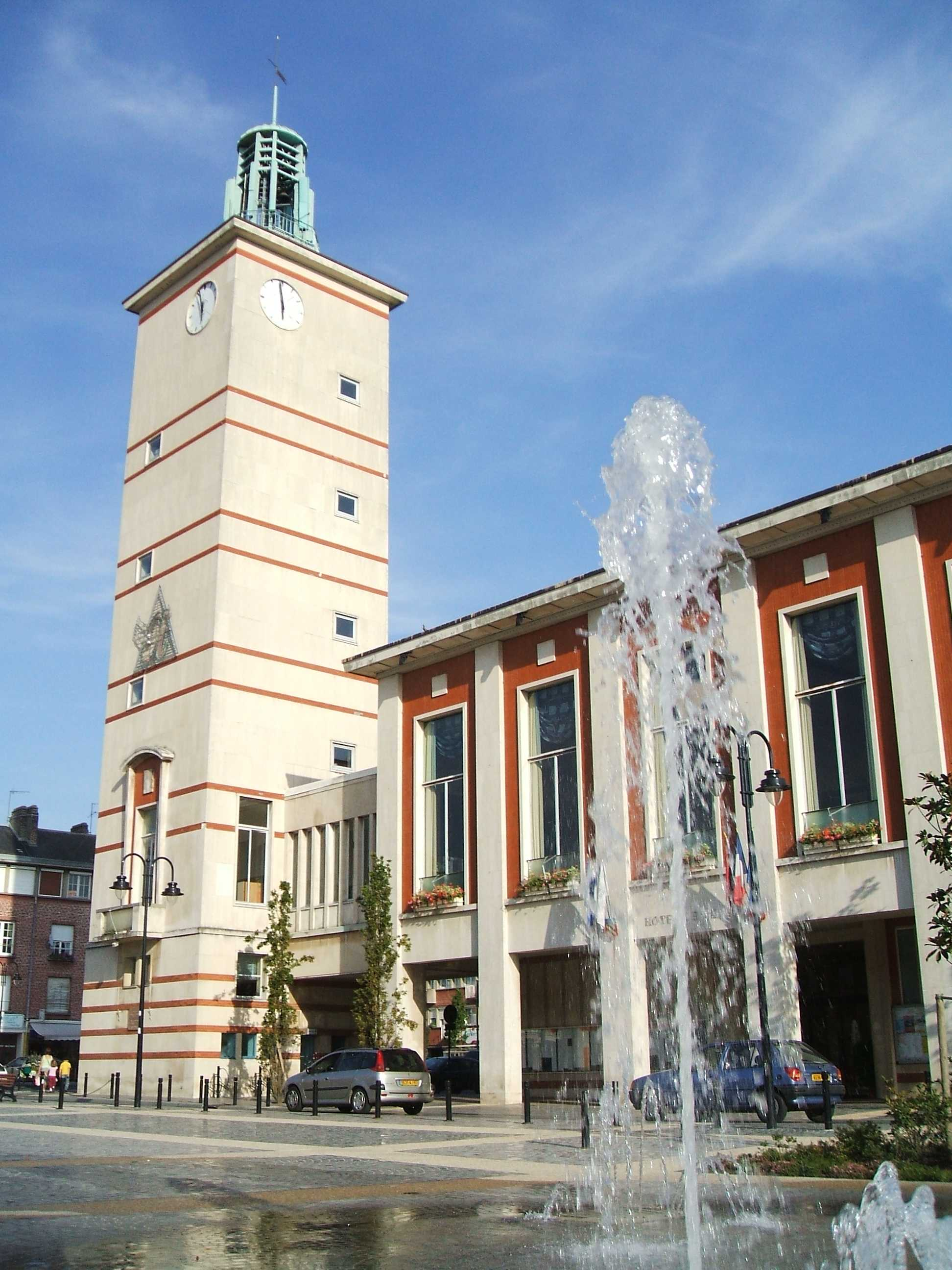
- The main frontage of the Hôtel de Ville in February 2008

General information
- Type: City hall
- Architectural style: Modern style
- Location: Abbeville, France
- Coordinates: 50.1058°N 1.8341°E
- Completed: 1960

Design and construction
- Architect: Clément Tambuté

The Hôtel de Ville (French pronunciation: [otɛl də vil], City Hall) is a municipal building in Abbeville, Somme, in northern France, standing on Place Max-Lejeune.

== History ==
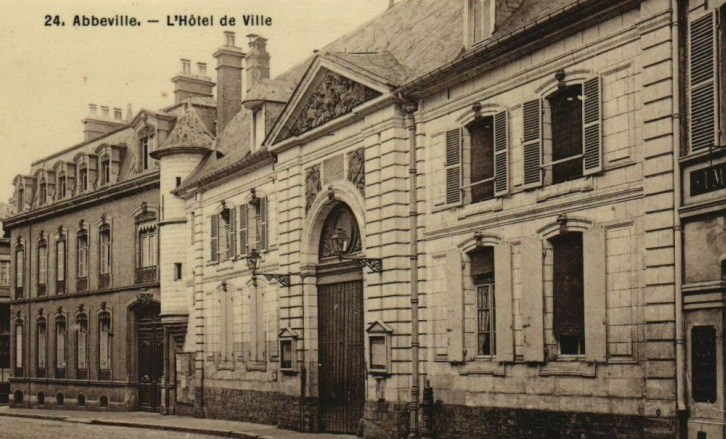
The old town hall

After John I of Ponthieu granted a charter to the town in 1184, the burghers had ambitions to commission a belfry. The site they selected for the new building was on the Place du Marché-au-blé (now Place Max-Lejeune). The first belfry was completed in the late 12th century but, by the early 13th century, it was considered too small and a second belfry was erected on a site some 250 metres (820 ft) further north on the east side of what is now Place de l'Amiral Courbet. The second belfry was subsequently augmented by a series of municipal buildings erected to the north of it.

In the early 18th century, the burghers decided to amalgamate these buildings into a dedicated town hall. The new town hall was designed in the neoclassical style, built in ashlar stone and completed in 1732. The design involved a broadly symmetrical main frontage of five bays facing onto the street. The central bay, which was slightly projected forward, featured a tall round-headed opening which was flanked by pairs of banded pilasters supporting an entablature and a pediment with elaborate carvings in the tympanum. The outer bays were fenestrated by segmental-headed windows with moulded surrounds and shutters on both floors and there was a bartizan at the southwestern corner.

On the night of 20 May 1940, during the Second World War, the town hall was completed destroyed by German bombing, just a few days before the German 2nd Panzer Division captured the town and overran Allied forces. The council subsequently found temporary accommodation in the Hôtel d'Emonville, where they were situated during the liberation of the town by the Polish 1st Armoured Division on 3 September 1944, and where they remained until a new town hall became available.

After the war, the council began planning the rebuilding the town and decided to erect a new town hall on the southeast side of what is now Place Max-Lejeune. The foundation stone for the reconstruction programme was laid by the President of France, Vincent Auriol, on 8 May 1948. The new building was designed by Clément Tambuté in the modern style, built in concrete and glass and was officially opened by the mayor, Max Lejeune, on 9 October 1960.

The design involved a main block of five bays facing onto the street and, to the northeast, a six-stage tower surmounted by a lantern. The tower contained a segmental-headed French door with a balcony in the second stage and was fenestrated by small square windows in each of the other stages. The main block was recessed on the ground floor and featured five tall casement windows on the first floor. The windows were flanked by concrete piers supporting the roof. Internally, the principal room was the Salle du Conseil (council chamber) which, in July 2021, was renamed to commemorate the life of the former mayor, Max Lejeune.
