= Church of Saint-Jacques, Abbeville =

Demolished church in Abbeville, France

Church of Saint-Jacques
- Église Saint-Jacques d'Abbeville
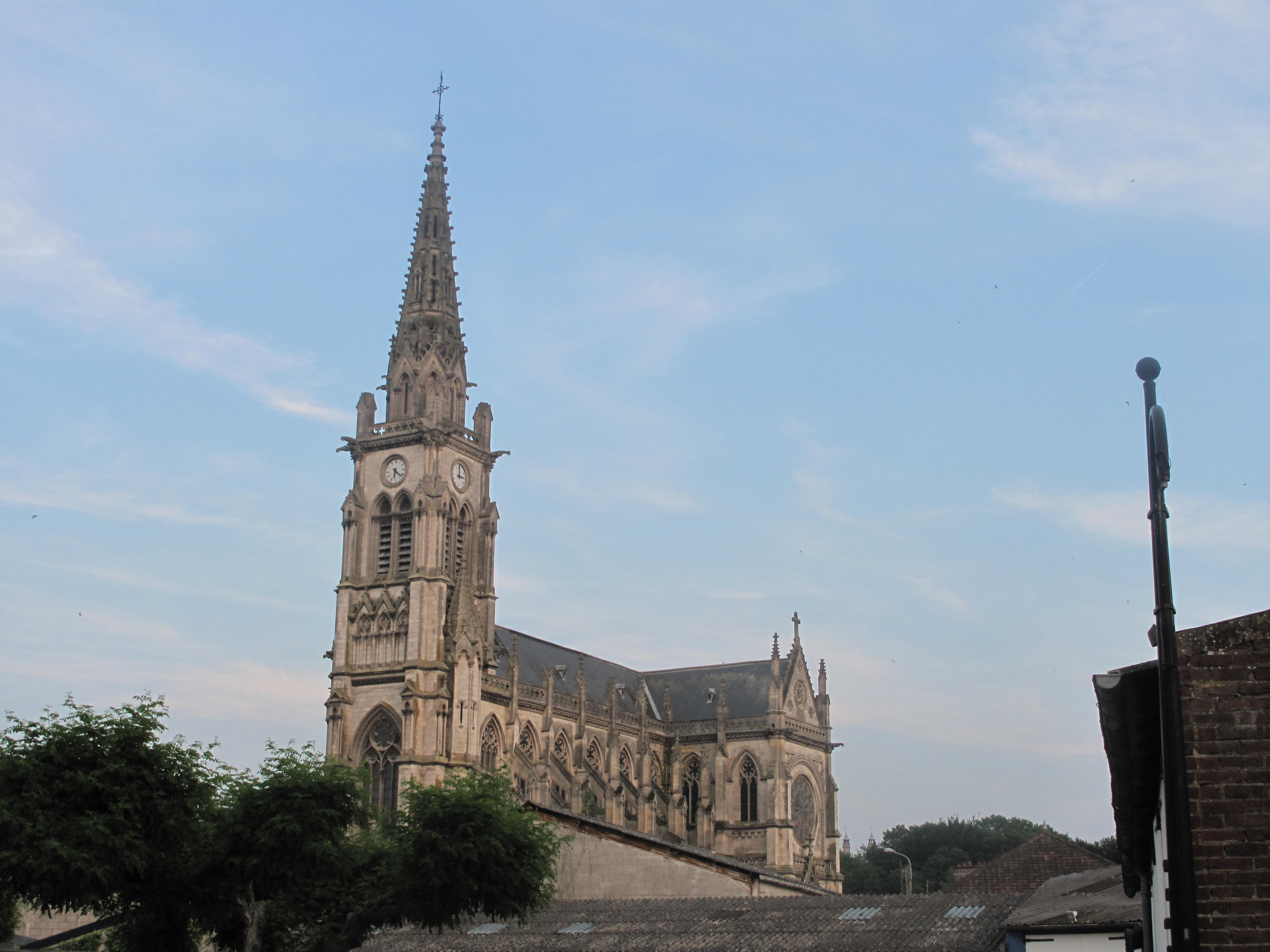
- Church of Saint-Jacques
- 50°6′30.74″N 1°49′41.64″E
- Location: Abbeville, Hauts-de-France
- Country: France
- Denomination: Roman Catholic

Architecture
- Architect: Victor Delefortrie
- Style: Neo-gothic
- Groundbreaking: 1868
- Completed: 1876
- Demolished: 2013

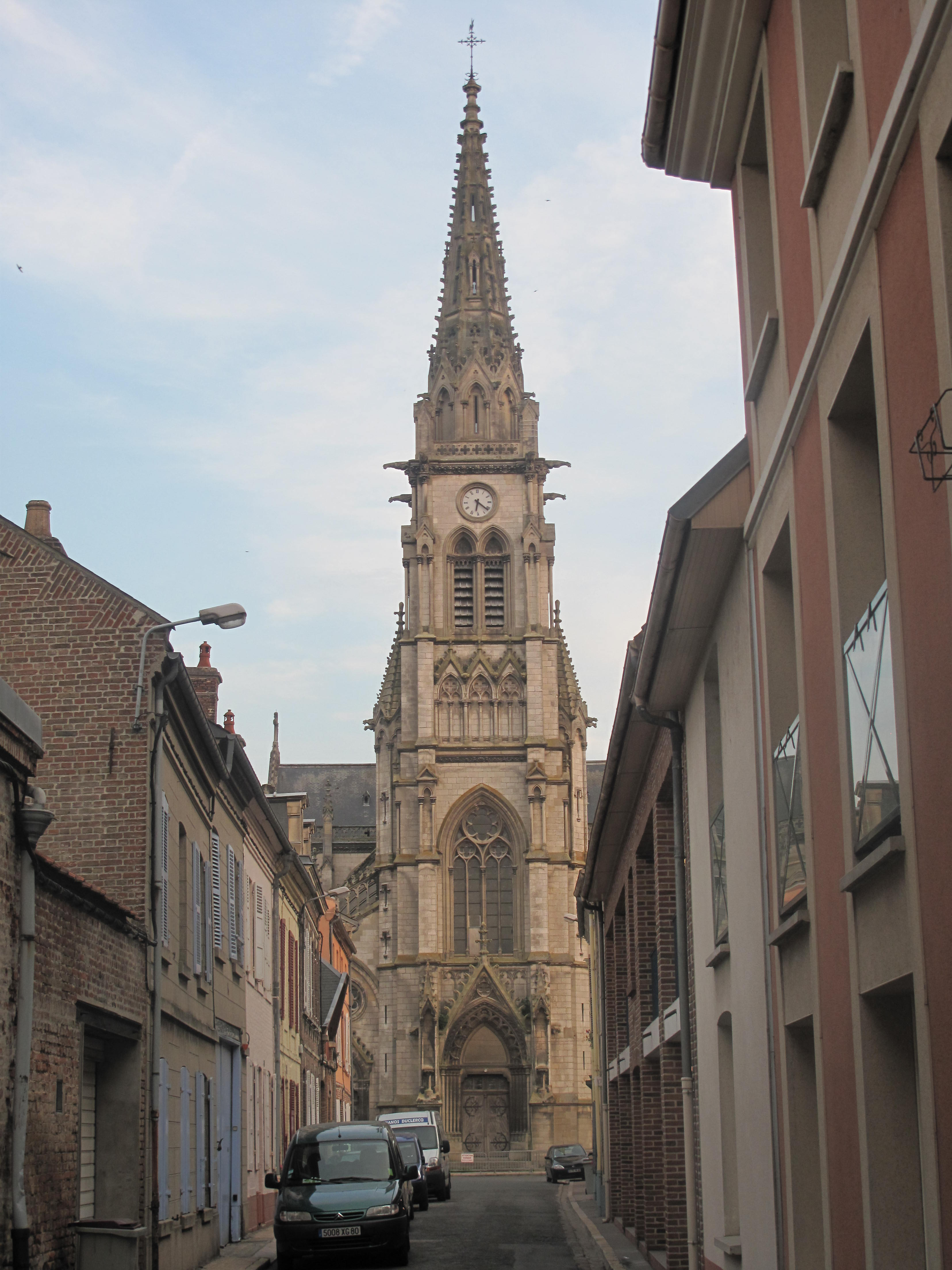
View of the church from the main street of Abbeville

The Church of Saint-Jacques (French: Église Saint-Jacques d'Abbeville) was a former Roman Catholic neo-Gothic church located in Abbeville, France.

The building, built from 1868 to 1876 on the site of a 12th-century church, gradually deteriorated due to lack of maintenance at the beginning of the 21st century. It was demolished from January to May 2013. In June 2013, a new park project presented by the town hall was approved by around thirty residents present. The works were carried out at the beginning of 2015.
