= Philippe Hecquet =

French physician (1661–1737)

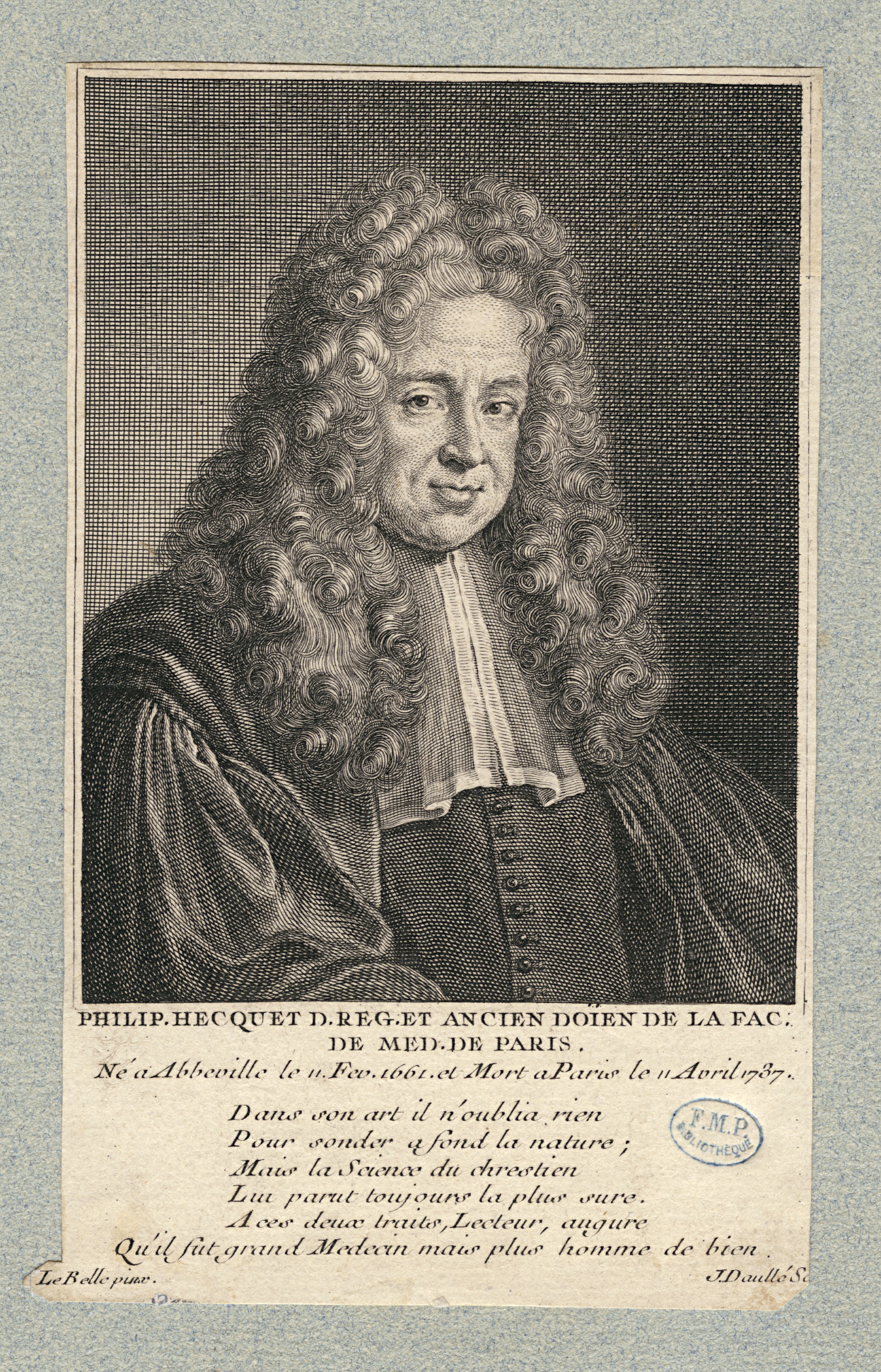
- Born: 11 February 1661; Abbeville, France
- Died: 11 April 1737 (aged 76); Paris, France
- Occupations: Physician, writer

Philippe Hecquet (11 February 1661 – 11 April 1737) was a French physician and vegetarianism activist.

== Biography ==
Hecquet obtained his M.D. from Reims in 1684. In 1688, he moved to Port-Royal-des-Champs, where he succeeded Jean Hamon, as physician. He spent much time helping the poor. In 1697, he became Doctor at University of Paris and received the official hat after an examination of "rare success". The Faculty named him Docteur-Régent and he was appointed as Professor of Materia Medica. In 1712, he was named Dean of the Faculty.

Hecquet was an ascetic, Cartesian mechanist and vegetarian. He was influenced by Porphyry. Hecquet was concerned with health from a diet perspective and campaigned against the consumption of meat, stating it interfered with digestion and circulation of the blood. Hecquet noted how the rich often consumed much expensive meat, spicy sauces and strong wine which was bad for health. He argued that such a diet was difficult for the body to digest and impaired the elasticity of the fluid-bearing organs. He stated that if flesh was to be eaten it should only be fish. He believed that fruits, grains, nuts and seeds should replace meat. Hecquet was a Jansenist Catholic and promoted a "theological medicine". He argued that the Garden of Eden depicted a vegetarian regime.

Hecquet argued that all physiological processes could be reduced to simple mechanisms. He developed a digestive theory of "trituration" which emphasized the grinding action of mastication and peristalsis of muscle walls of the stomach. Hecquet believed fish and vegetables are superior to meat because their composition is easily broken down by trituration.

Hecquet has been described as "one of the first systematic proponents of vegetarianism". Historian Ken Albala credits Hecquet for making the first scientific defense of a vegetarian diet.

== Selected publications ==
- Traité de dispenses du Careme (1710)
- La Médecine, la Chirurgie, et la Pharmacie des Pauvres (1740-1742)
- La Brigandage de la Médecine (1755)

== See also ==
- History of vegetarianism
