= Jean-Baptiste Sanson de Pongerville =

French man of letters and poet

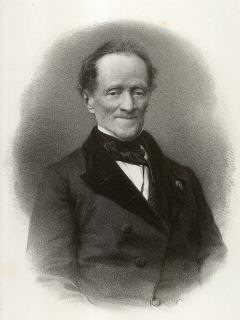
Sanson de Pongerville

Jean-Baptiste Sanson de Pongerville (3 March 1782, Abbeville – 22 January 1870, Paris) was a French man of letters and poet. He was elected the tenth occupant of Académie française seat 31 in 1830.
