= Collegiate Church of Saint-Vulfran =

- Collégiale Saint-Vulfran d'Abbeville
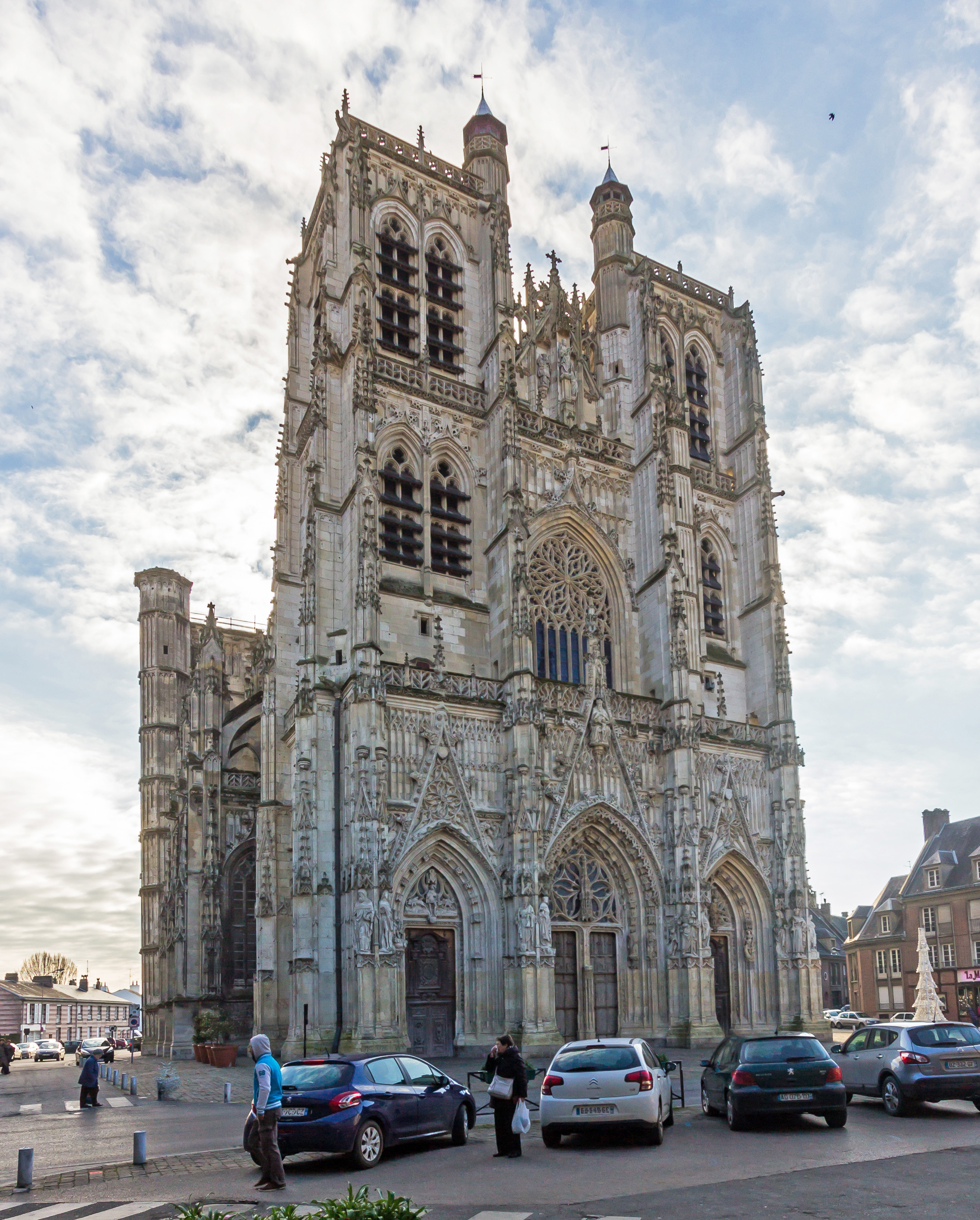
- Collegiate Church of Saint-Vulfran
- 50.1048°N 1.8319°E
- Country: France
- Denomination: Roman Catholic

History
- Dedication: Saint Vulfran

Architecture
- Style: Gothic Flamboyant
- Groundbreaking: 7 June 1488
- Completed: 1663

The Collegiate Church of Saint-Vulfran (French: Collégiale Saint-Vulfran) is a collegiate church located in Abbeville, France. The church, dedicated to Saint Vulfran is of Flamboyant Gothic style.

== History ==
The construction of the church was started on 7 June 1488. From 31 August it was clear that funding would be an issue and thus the construction was ceased for some time. On 4 April 1520 Jean Crétel of Tours-en-Vimeu was commissioned to lead the work. The nave would be under construction until 1539. Construction resumed 120 years later when the choir was built in two years, from 1661 to 1663 in a more simplified style.

As the French Revolution took place, the church became a Temple of Reason and a feast was celebrated in honor of the Supreme Being on 8 June 1794. Catholic worship in the church resumed in 1803. The church was listed as a Monument historique in 1840.

=== Damages during World War II ===
The church was heavily damaged on 20 May 1940 by German bombings as part of the Battle of France in World War II. The restoration of the church was not completed until 1998.
