= Robert Mallet (writer) =

French writer and academic

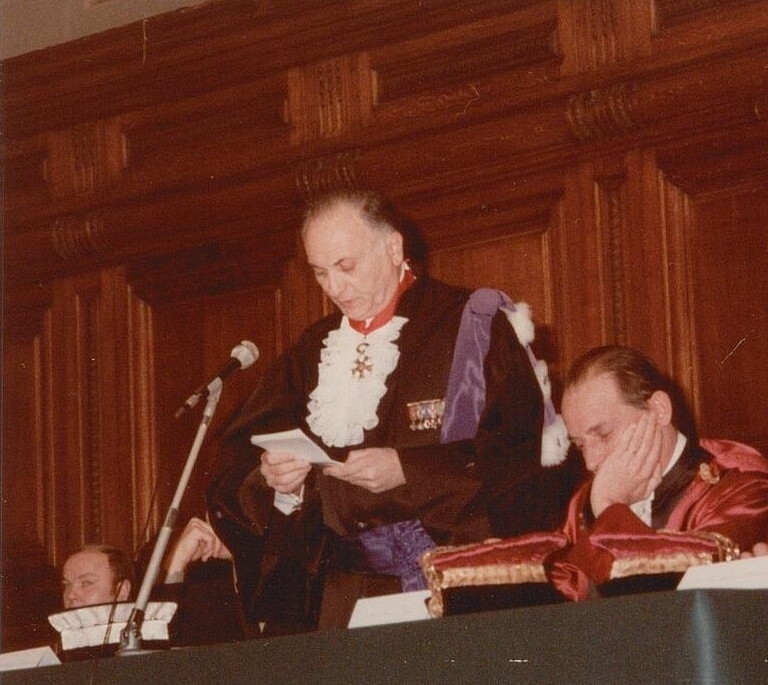
- Robert Mallet in 1977
- Born: 15 February 1915
- Died: 4 December 2002 (aged 87)
- Occupations: Writer, academic
- Title: Dean of the University of Antananarivo; Rector of the Academy of Amiens; Rector-Chancellor of the Académie de Paris; a founder and professor of the University of Paris-VII; Chairman the board of directors of the Agence universitaire de la Francophonie (AUPELF)
- Awards: Prix Fabien; Gustave Le Métais-Larivière Prize; Prix Archon-Despérouses; Grand Prix de Poésie; Prix des libraires; Prix mondial Cino Del Duca

Robert Mallet (15 March 1915 – 4 December 2002) was a French writer and academic. He was the first Dean of the University of Antananarivo. He was also the Rector of the Academy of Amiens, Rector-Chancellor of the Académie de Paris, one of the founders of and a professor of the University of Paris-VII, and Chairman of the board of directors of the Agence universitaire de la Francophonie (AUPELF). In 1993 he was awarded the Prix mondial Cino Del Duca.

== Biography ==
Mallet taught in Madagascar from 1959 to 1964, where he founded the Faculty of Letters at the University of Antananarivo, of which he was the first Dean.

He returned to France, and worked for the French Ministry of National Education. Mallet pleaded for the establishment of a separate academy in Amiens. The Academy of Amiens was created on 1 October 1964 and Mallet became its first Rector. He built the campus and supported the creation of the University of Amiens.

In 1969, Mallet became Rector-Chancellor of the Académie de Paris, a position he retained until 1980. During this period, he was one of the founders of the University of Paris-VII, where he was a professor from 1980 until his retirement in 1983.

From 1972 to 1975, Mallet chaired the board of directors of the Agence universitaire de la Francophonie (AUPELF). He was a member of the Academy of Sciences, Letters and Arts of Amiens.

== Works ==
The following works of Mallet are poetry, unless otherwise stated.

- La Poursuite amoureuse (1932-1940), Paris, Mercure de France, 1943 (novel).
- L'Égoise key or the book of octosyllables, Paris, Robert Laffont, 1946.
- Les Poèmes du feu, Paris, L'Ancre d'or, 1947.
- De All Sorrows, Paris, Robert Laffont, 1948.
- La Châtelaine de Coucy, or no morality without love, Paris, L'Ancre d'or, 1950.
- Love, password, Paris, Seghers, 1952.
- Une mort ambigue, Paris, Éditions Gallimard, 1955 (essay).
- The Complete Crew, Gallimard, 1958 (theater).
- Mahafaliennes, Gallimard, 1961.
- Le Poème du sablier, Gallimard, 1962 (Prix Archon-Despérouses).
- The rose in its eddies, Gallimard, 1971.
- Apostille or the useful and the futile, Gallimard, 1972.
- When the mirror is surprised, Gallimard, 1974.
- Exploded flint, Gallimard, 1976.
- The blacksmith had told me, followed by Mots princiers, Gallimard, 1982.
- The Hot Shadow, Gallimard, 1984.
- Ellynn, Gallimard, 1985 (novel - Prix des libraires, Charles Oulmont Prize from the Fondation de France 1985).
- This whirling feather: poems, Gallimard, 1988.
- Uninhabited region, Gallimard, 1991.
- Sowing the tree, poems, Gallimard, 1991.
- The uncertain shores, Gallimard, 1993.
- From the same bread, Ultimes reflections, the Green Wave, 2012.

== Radio ==
Mallet worked at the Office de Radiodiffusion Télévision Française, where he was known for his interviews with Paul Léautaud or Jean Paulhan and for a series of documents on the French National Library.

== Awards ==
- 1942: Prix Fabien, for Le Retour à la terre
- 1959: Gustave Le Métais-Larivière Prize, for all of his work
- 1963: Prix Archon-Despérouses of the Académie Française, for Le poème du sablier
- 1977: Grand Prix de Poésie, for all of his poetic work
- 1993: Prix mondial Cino Del Duca
