= Philippus Brietius =

French Jesuit historian and cartographer

Philippus Brietius (in French, Philippe Briet) (1601–1668) was a seventeenth-century French Jesuit historian and cartographer.

== List of works ==
- Acute dicta omnium veterum Latinorum poetarum opus editum ad usum serenissimi Ducis Guisii . . . de omnibus iisdem poeticis syntagma. Paris, F. Muguet, 1664
- Theatre Geographique de l'Europe... Paris, Pierre Mariette.
- Parallela Geogr. Veterus et Novae 1648, Atlas 1653.
