= Departmental Council of Loire =

Departmental legislature in France

Departmental Council of Loire Conseil départemental de la Loire
- Logo of the Council

Leadership
- President: Georges Ziegler, LR since 16 October 2017

Website
- www.loire.fr

The Departmental Council of Loire (French: Conseil départemental de la Loire, Arpitan: Consèly Dèpartamentâla de Lêre) is the deliberative assembly of the French department of Loire. It consists of 42 members (departmental councilors) elected for a 6-years term and its headquarters are in Saint-Étienne, capital of the department.

== Executive ==
=== President ===
The president of the departmental council is Georges Ziegler (LR), departmental councilor elected from the canton of Saint-Étienne-1 on 16 October 2017 (re-elected in 2021).

==== List of successive presidents ====
- 1902-1917 : Gabriel Réal
- 1917-1919 : Jean Morel
- 1919-1921 : Albert Boël
- 1921-1931 : Antoine Durafour
- 1931-1934 : Fernand Merlin
- 1934-1940 : Jean Neyret
- 1945-1949 : Aimé Malécot
- 1949-1979 : Antoine Pinay
- 1979-1994 : Lucien Neuwirth
- 1994-2008 : Pascal Clément
- 2008-2017 : Bernard Bonne
- 2017-Incumbent : Georges Ziegler

=== Vice-presidents ===
List of vice-presidents of the departmental council (as of 2021)
Order	Name	Delegation
1st	Hervé Reynaud	Finance
2nd	Clotilde Robin	Education and colleges
3rd	Jean-Yves Bonnefoy	Youth and sports
4th	Véronique Chaverot	Economic attractiveness and tourism
5th	Jérémie Lacroix	Roads and mobility
6th	Séverine Reynaud	Technology
7th	Eric Lardon	Territorial solidarity
8th	Nadia Semache	Employment
9th	Daniel Fréchet	Water and environment
10th	Chantal Brosse	Agriculture
11th	Julien Luya	Human resources
12th	Corinne Besson-Fayolle	Cultures

== Composition ==
The Departemental Council consists of 42 councillors (conseillers départementaux) who come from the 21 cantons of Loire. They are elected for a 6-years term.
