= Cantons of the Loire department =

The following is a list of the 21 cantons of the Loire department, in France, following the French canton reorganisation which came into effect in March 2015:

- Andrézieux-Bouthéon
- Boën-sur-Lignon
- Charlieu
- Le Coteau
- Feurs
- Firminy
- Montbrison
- Le Pilat
- Renaison
- Rive-de-Gier
- Roanne-1
- Roanne-2
- Saint-Chamond
- Saint-Étienne-1
- Saint-Étienne-2
- Saint-Étienne-3
- Saint-Étienne-4
- Saint-Étienne-5
- Saint-Étienne-6
- Saint-Just-Saint-Rambert
- Sorbiers
