= Jean-Michel Dalgabio =

French architect

Jean-Michel Dalgabio (15 September 1788, Riva Valdobbia, Piedmont — 31 December 1852, Oullins) was a French architect.

A protégé of Antoine Vaudoyer, Dalgabio became the town architect of Saint-Étienne and taught there at the School of Architecture. Among his notable works are the cemetery chapel, abattoirs, Exchange (1820), Hôtel de Ville (City Hall), and other administration buildings of Saint-Étienne (1821–8). He also oversaw the building of the local barracks, prison, and corn market.
