= Saint-Étienne – Gorges de la Loire Nature Reserve =

Nature reserve in France

Saint-Étienne - Gorges de la Loire Nature Reserve
- IUCN category IV (habitat/species management area)
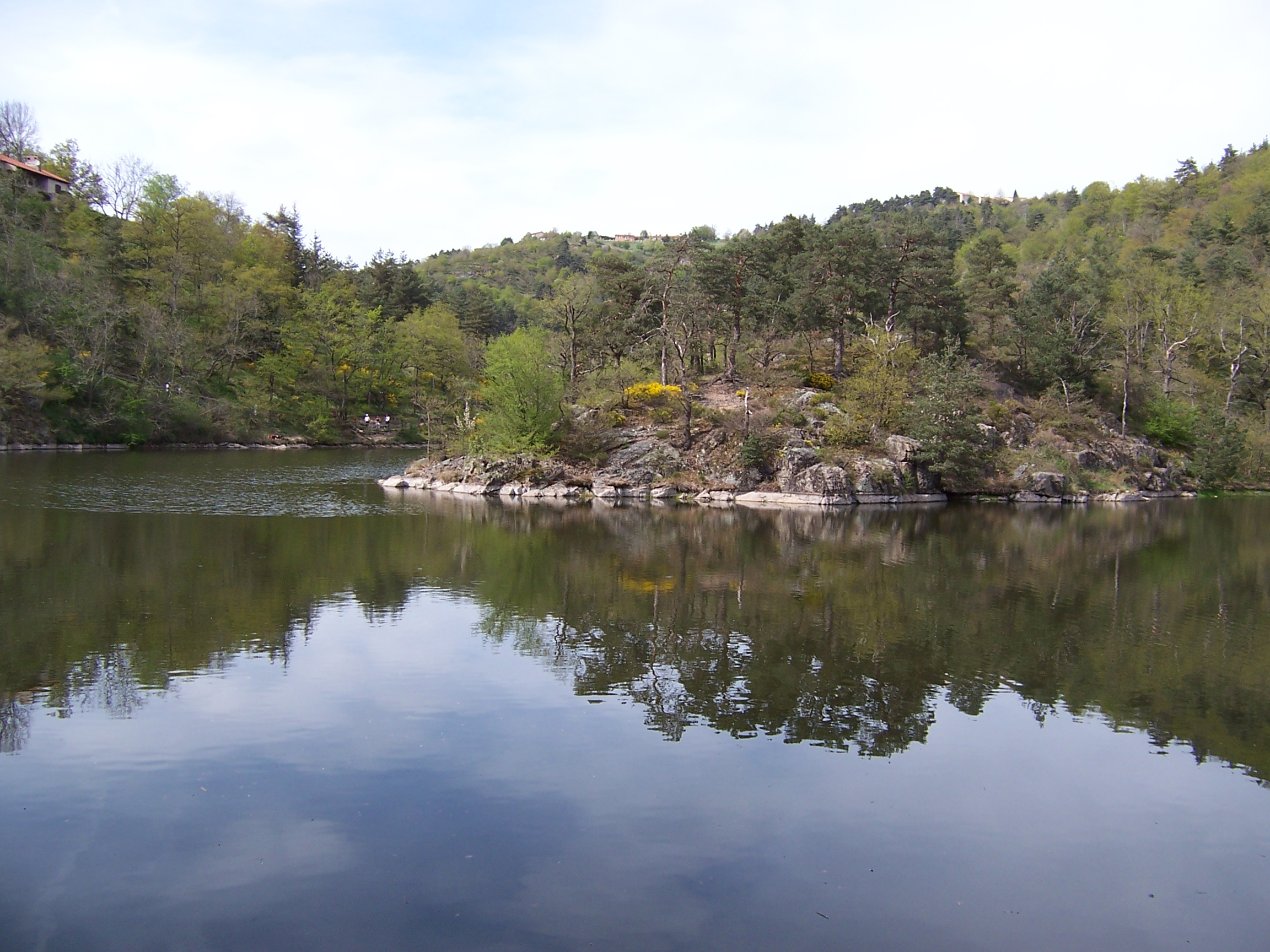
- Lac de Grangent near Saint-Victor-sur-Lorie

- Location within France
- Location: Loire, France
- Nearest city: Saint-Étienne
- Coordinates: 45°27′N 4°15′E
- Area: 312 ha (770 acres)
- Established: 1988
- Governing body: Syndicat mixte d'aménagement des Gorges de la Loire

The Saint-Étienne – Gorges de la Loire Nature Reserve is a natural reserve located in Saint-Étienne, France. It was created on 1988 and is made up of 312 hectares of the river Loire.
