= Le Progrès =

French regional daily newspaper

- Type: Daily newspaper
- Format: Broadsheet
- Owner: L'est Républicain
- Founded: 1859; 167 years ago
- Language: French
- Headquarters: Lyon
- Circulation: 156,113 (as of 2020)
- ISSN: 0243-9808 (print); 2102-6807 (web)
- Website: www.leprogres.fr

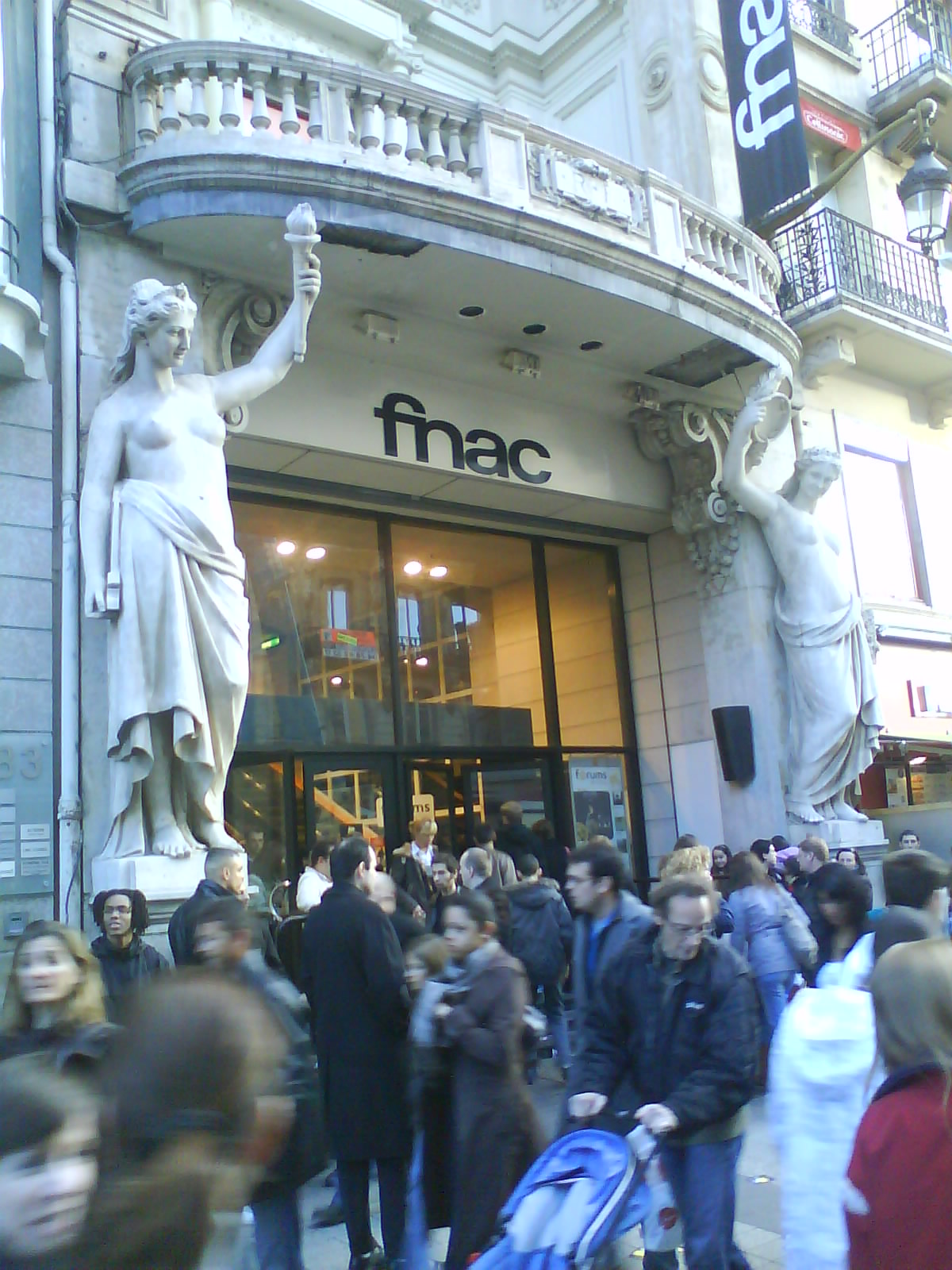
Former Progrès building, now a FNAC.

Le Progrès (French pronunciation: [lə pʁɔɡʁɛ], lit. 'The Progress') is a regional daily newspaper which is based in Lyon, Rhône, France.

Le Progrès reports primarily on local news in the Rhône-Alpes region. The paper has its headquarters in Lyon. The print works is in Chassieu, near Lyon. The former headquarters was located in the Rue de la République, in the building that is currently occupied by Fnac. René Diaz worked there as a journalist and illustrator for 30 years.

The 1998 circulation of the paper was 262,000 copies; by 2020, it was 151,811 copies.
