= René Diaz =

René Diaz (St. Etienne, 1926) is a French journalist-illustrator who worked at Le Progrès in Lyon for 30 years. He did all the drawings of the trial of Klaus Barbie, the Nazi criminal known as "the butcher of Lyon".

== Exhibitions ==
- Centre d’Histoire de la résistance et de la Déportation of Lyon
- Memorial of Yad Vashem in Jerusalem

== Sources ==
- http://www1.yadvashem.org/about_yad/magazine/magazine_new/franch/events_barbie_main.html
- http://www.guysen.com/print.php?sid=5131
- http://www.fra.cityvox.fr/expositions-arts_lyon/des-croquis-pour-l-histoire-dessins-de-p_160019/Profil-Eve
