= Canton of Saint-Étienne-4 =

Coordinates: 45.45°N 4.40°E

Saint-Étienne-4
- Canton
- Country: France
- Region: Auvergne-Rhône-Alpes
- Department: Loire
- No. of communes: {{{nbcomm}}}
- Population (2023): 36,075
- INSEE code: 42 17

The canton of Saint-Étienne-4 (before 2015: Saint-Étienne-Nord-Ouest-1) is a French administrative division located in the department of Loire and the Auvergne-Rhône-Alpes region. It has the following communes:

- Saint-Étienne (partly)
- Villars

== See also ==
- Cantons of the Loire department
