= Hôtel de Ville, Saint-Étienne =

Town hall in Saint-Étienne, France

Hôtel de Ville
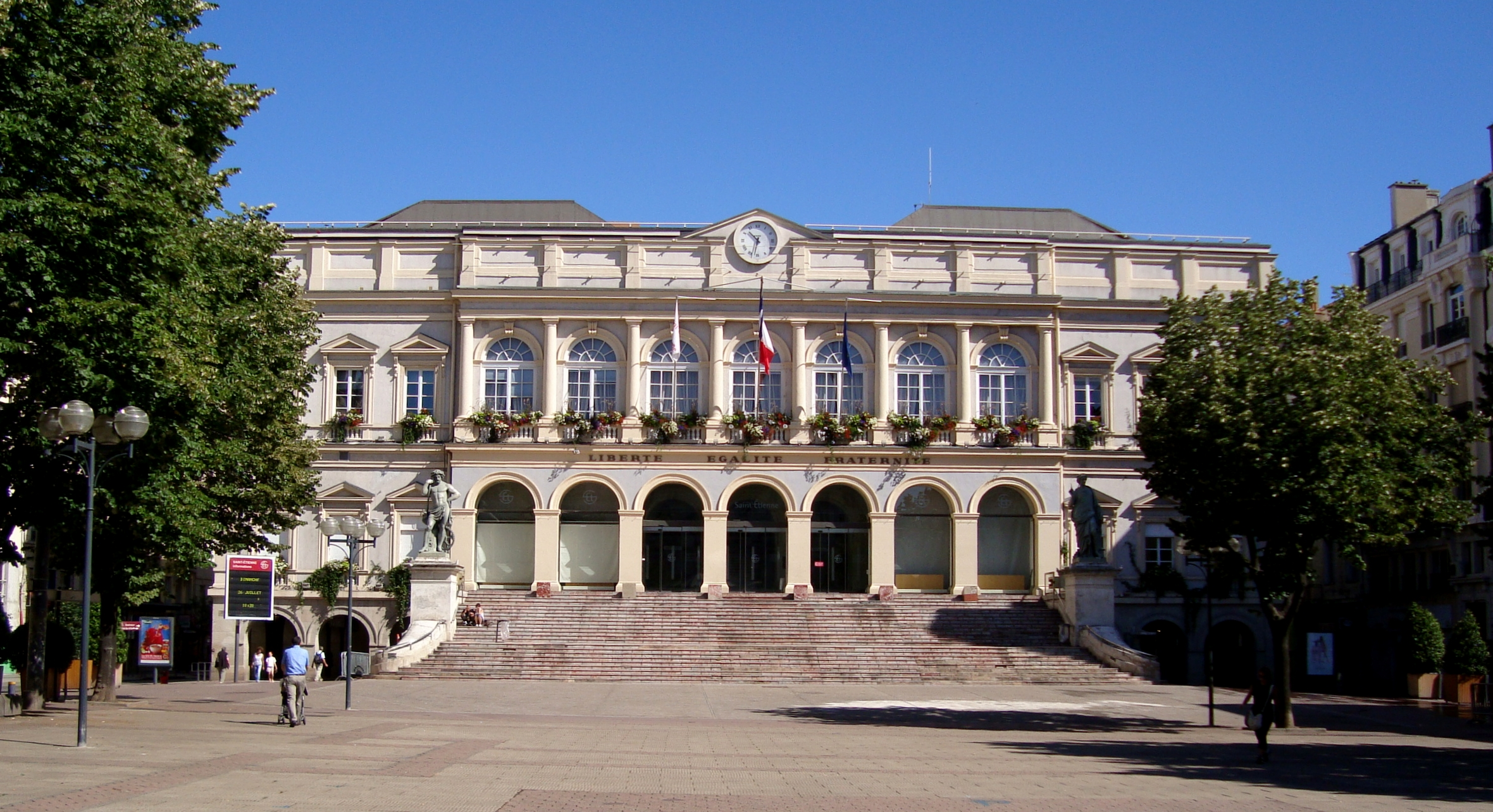
- The main frontage of the Hôtel de Ville in July 2009
- Interactive map of the Hôtel de Ville area

General information
- Type: City hall
- Architectural style: Renaissance style
- Location: Saint-Étienne, France
- Coordinates: 45.4402°N 4.3873°E
- Completed: 1830

Design and construction
- Architect: Jean-Michel Dalgabio

The Hôtel de Ville (French pronunciation: [otɛl də vil], City Hall) is a historic building in Saint-Étienne, Loire, eastern-central France, standing on the Place Hôtel de Ville. It has been listed on the Inventaire général des monuments by the French Government since 1996.

== History ==
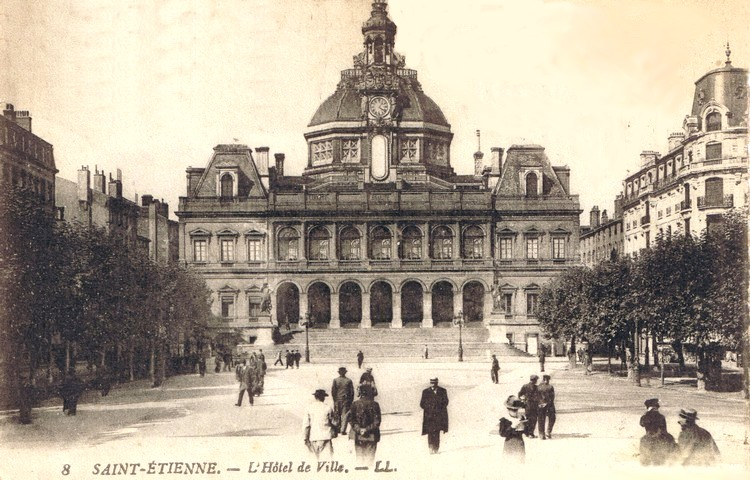
The building in the early 20th century with its dome

From 1510, the town council held its meetings in a house adjoining the Grand Église in Place Boivin, before relocating to a more substantial building opposite the Grand Église, and then moving to the Église Saint-Louis in Rue Léon Nautin in 1791. In the early 19th century, the council decided to commission a purpose-built town hall. The site they selected was on the north side of the Place Monsieur (now the Place de l'Hôtel de Ville) and extensive preparatory works were required, including the re-routing of the River Furan.

The foundation stone for the new building was laid by the mayor, Hippolyte Royet, on 25 August 1822. It was designed by Jean-Michel Dalgabio in the Renaissance style, built in ashlar stone and was completed in 1830.

The design involved a symmetrical main frontage of 13 bays facing south onto Place Monsieur. The central section of seven bays featured a wide flight of steps leading up to a seven-arch arcade; on the first floor, there was a row of rounded headed windows with moulded surrounds and keystones flanked by Doric order columns supporting an entablature, a cornice and a parapet. The end sections of three bays each featured arches at basement level and were fenestrated by pedimented casement windows on the ground and first floors: they were surmounted by entablatures, cornices, parapets and mansard roofs. A large octagonal dome, designed by Étienne Boisson, was installed above the building in 1858.

On 24 March 1871, inspired by the establishment of the Paris Commune, a crowd of revolutionary guardsmen stormed the town hall, and demanded a referendum on the establishment of a similar commune in Saint-Étienne. In the ensuing melee, shots were fired and the Prefect of the Loire Department, Henri de L'Espée, was assassinated and a commune was declared, although the French Army eventually regained control.

Two statues, sculpted by Étienne Montagny, were installed on pedestals on either side of the steps in November 1872: the male figure represented metallurgy and the female figure represented ribbon-making, both of which were important local industries. Montagny also created caryatids on either side of the dome. Meanwhile, a bronze statue depicting two nymphs at a fountain was designed by the sculptor, Albert-Ernest Carrier-Belleuse, cast at the foundry of André-Barbezat & Company, and installed in a niche at the rear of the building in 1874.

Following the deaths of 925 local people during American aerial bombing of the area on 26 May 1944, the leader of Vichy France, Marshal Philippe Pétain, visited the town hall and spoke to the grieving crowd from the balcony on 6 June 1944. After a serious fire, the dome was demolished in 1953 and the arcade on the ground floor was enclosed by glass in 1970. A carillon of 16 bells was erected at the rear of the building in 2000.
