= Saint-Genest-Lerpt =

- Commune
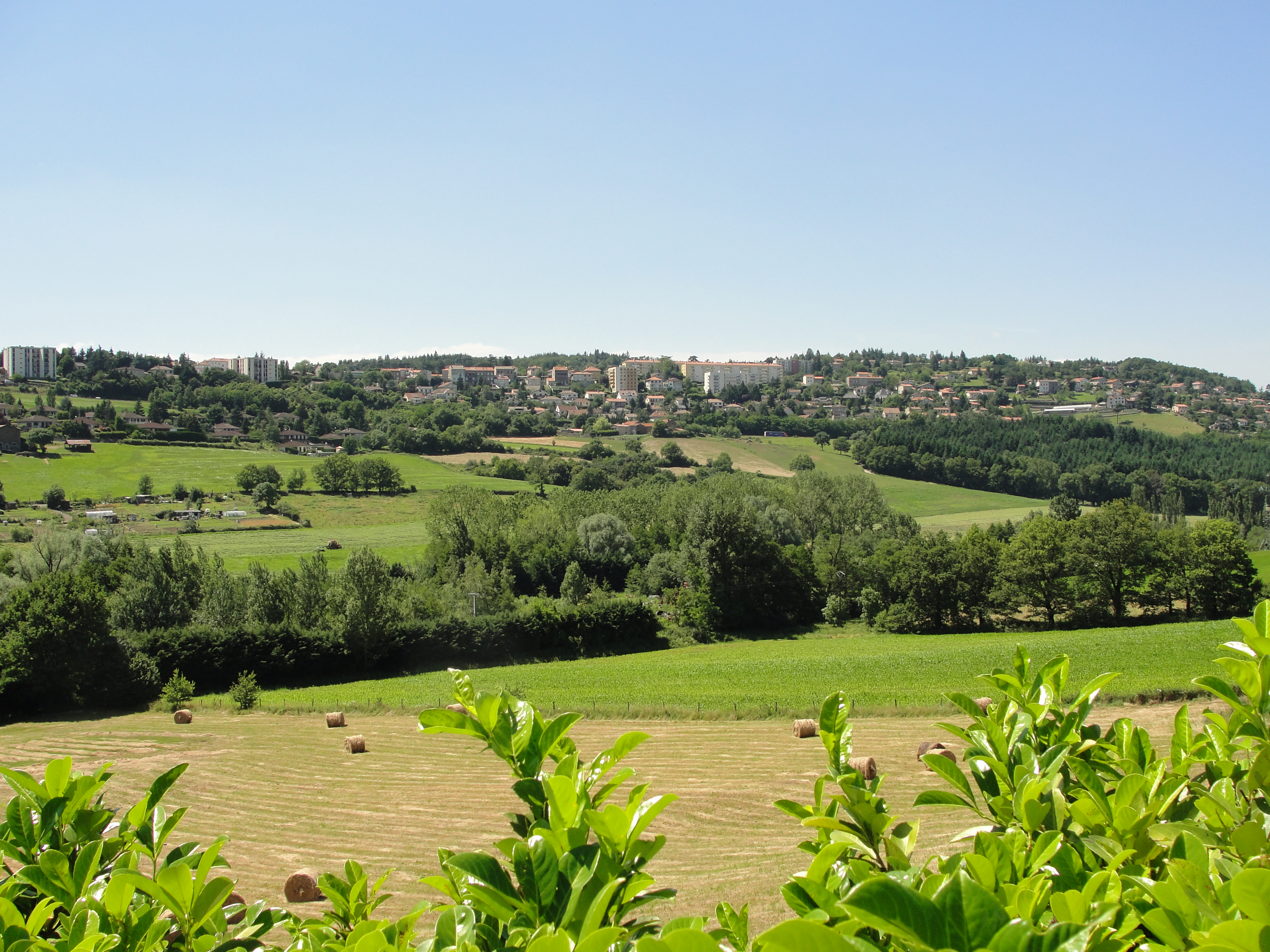

- Coat of arms
- Location of Saint-Genest-Lerpt
- Location within France Location within Auvergne-Rhône-Alpes
- Coordinates: 45°26′49″N 4°20′15″E
- Country: France
- Region: Auvergne-Rhône-Alpes
- Department: Loire
- Arrondissement: Saint-Étienne
- Canton: Saint-Étienne-3
- Intercommunality: Saint-Étienne Métropole

Government
  - Mayor (2020–2026): Christian Julien
- Area^{1}: 12.68 km^{2} (4.90 sq mi)
- Elevation: 576 m (1,890 ft)
- Highest elevation: 698 m (2,290 ft)
- Lowest elevation: 437 m (1,434 ft)
- Population (2023): 6,181
  - Density: 487.5/km^{2} (1,263/sq mi)
- Time zone: UTC+01:00 (CET)
  - Summer (DST): UTC+02:00 (CEST)
- INSEE/Postal code: 42223 /42530
- ^{1} French Land Register data, which excludes lakes, ponds, glaciers > 1 km^{2} (0.386 sq mi or 247 acres) and river estuaries.

Saint-Genest-Lerpt (French pronunciation: [sɛ̃ ʒənɛ lɛʁ]) is a commune in the Loire department in central France.

== Population ==
Historical population

Year	Pop.	±% p.a.
1793	763	—
1800	574	−3.98%
1806	751	+4.58%
1821	949	+1.57%
1831	1,308	+3.26%
1836	1,401	+1.38%
1841	1,600	+2.69%
1846	1,693	+1.14%
1851	1,824	+1.50%
1856	2,398	+5.62%
1861	2,515	+0.96%
1866	2,724	+1.61%
1872	2,841	+0.70%
1876	3,632	+6.33%
1881	3,425	−1.17%
1886	3,730	+1.72%
1891	3,959	+1.20%
1896	4,144	+0.92%
1901	4,331	+0.89%

Year	Pop.	±% p.a.
1906	4,281	−0.23%
1911	4,128	−0.73%
1921	4,554	+0.99%
1926	4,570	+0.07%
1931	4,239	−1.49%
1936	4,238	−0.00%
1946	4,571	+0.76%
1954	5,115	+1.42%
1962	5,147	+0.08%
1968	5,331	+0.59%
1975	5,265	−0.18%
1982	5,308	+0.12%
1990	5,482	+0.40%
1999	5,672	+0.38%
2007	5,547	−0.28%
2012	5,867	+1.13%
2017	6,131	+0.88%
2023	6,181	+0.14%

Source: EHESS and INSEE (1968-2023)

== Twin towns ==
Saint-Genest-Lerpt is twinned with Palau, Sardinia, Italy, since 2005.

== See also ==
- Communes of the Loire department
