= Saint-Priest-en-Jarez =

- Commune
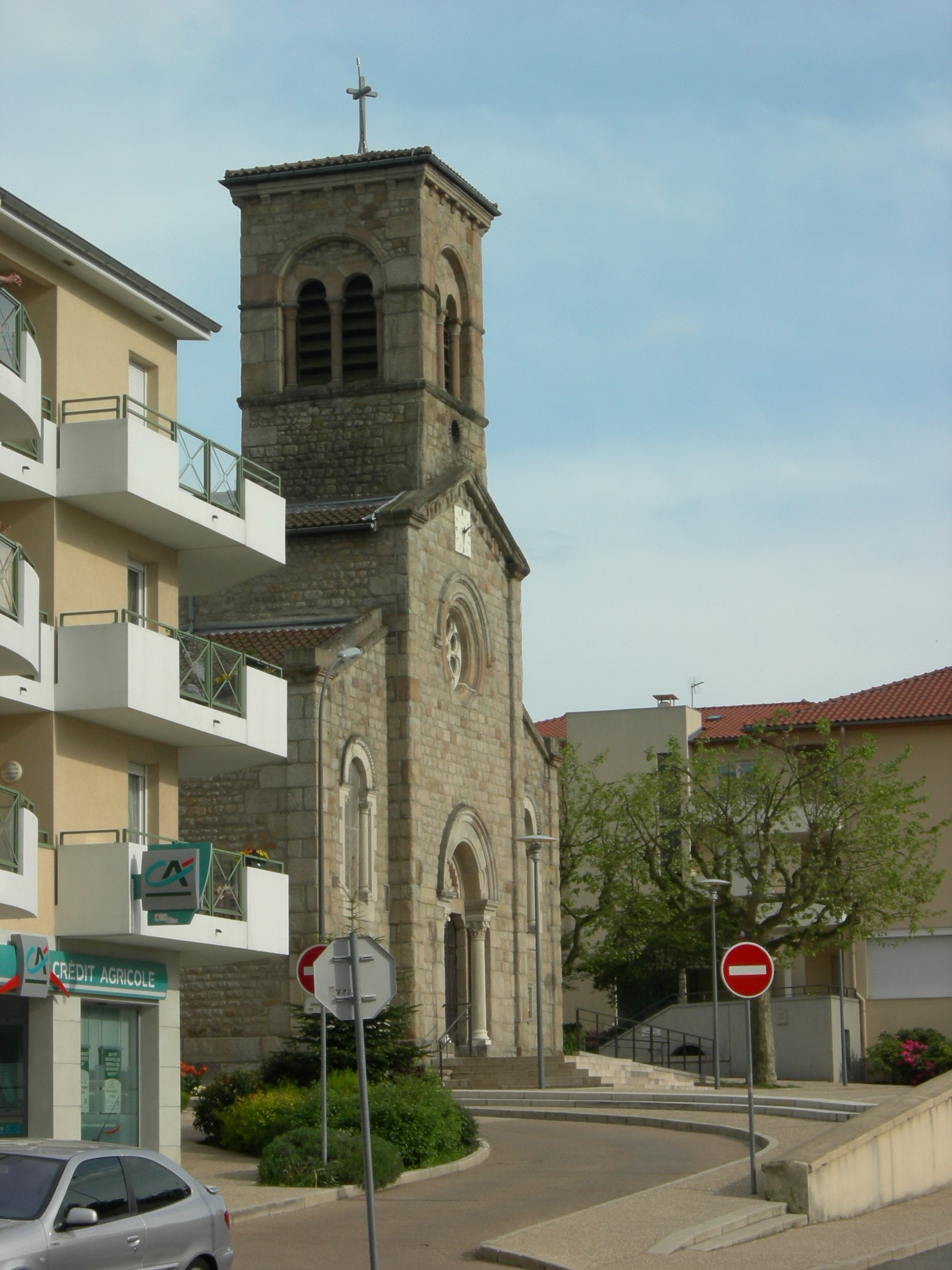

- Coat of arms
- Location of Saint-Priest-en-Jarez
- Location within France Location within Auvergne-Rhône-Alpes
- Coordinates: 45°28′30″N 4°22′44″E
- Country: France
- Region: Auvergne-Rhône-Alpes
- Department: Loire
- Arrondissement: Saint-Étienne
- Canton: Saint-Étienne-5
- Intercommunality: Saint-Étienne Métropole

Government
  - Mayor (2020–2026): Christian Servant
- Area^{1}: 3.07 km^{2} (1.19 sq mi)
- Elevation: 531 m (1,742 ft)
- Highest elevation: 590 m (1,940 ft)
- Lowest elevation: 437 m (1,434 ft)
- Population (2023): 6,471
  - Density: 2,110/km^{2} (5,460/sq mi)
- Time zone: UTC+01:00 (CET)
  - Summer (DST): UTC+02:00 (CEST)
- INSEE/Postal code: 42275 /42270
- ^{1} French Land Register data, which excludes lakes, ponds, glaciers > 1 km^{2} (0.386 sq mi or 247 acres) and river estuaries.

Saint-Priest-en-Jarez (French pronunciation: [sɛ̃ pʁijɛ ɑ̃ ʒaʁɛ]) is a commune in the Loire department in central France.

== Population ==
Historical population

Year	Pop.	±% p.a.
1793	652	—
1800	693	+0.88%
1806	752	+1.37%
1821	657	−0.90%
1831	665	+0.12%
1836	742	+2.22%
1841	858	+2.95%
1846	900	+0.96%
1851	950	+1.09%
1856	1,068	+2.37%
1861	1,006	−1.19%
1866	1,051	+0.88%
1872	1,084	+0.52%
1876	1,489	+8.26%
1881	1,467	−0.30%
1886	1,468	+0.01%
1891	1,637	+2.20%
1896	1,652	+0.18%
1901	1,736	+1.00%

Year	Pop.	±% p.a.
1906	1,998	+2.85%
1911	1,877	−1.24%
1921	2,343	+2.24%
1926	2,544	+1.66%
1931	2,605	+0.48%
1936	2,473	−1.03%
1946	2,624	+0.59%
1954	2,889	+1.21%
1962	3,485	+2.37%
1968	3,788	+1.40%
1975	4,628	+2.90%
1982	4,563	−0.20%
1990	5,673	+2.76%
1999	5,812	+0.27%
2007	6,051	+0.51%
2012	6,142	+0.30%
2017	6,120	−0.07%
2023	6,471	+0.93%

Source: EHESS and INSEE (1968-2023)

== Personalities ==
- Faouzi Ghoulam (born 1991), footballer
- İlhan Fakılı (born 2006), footballer

== See also ==
- Communes of the Loire department
