= Roche-la-Molière =

- Commune
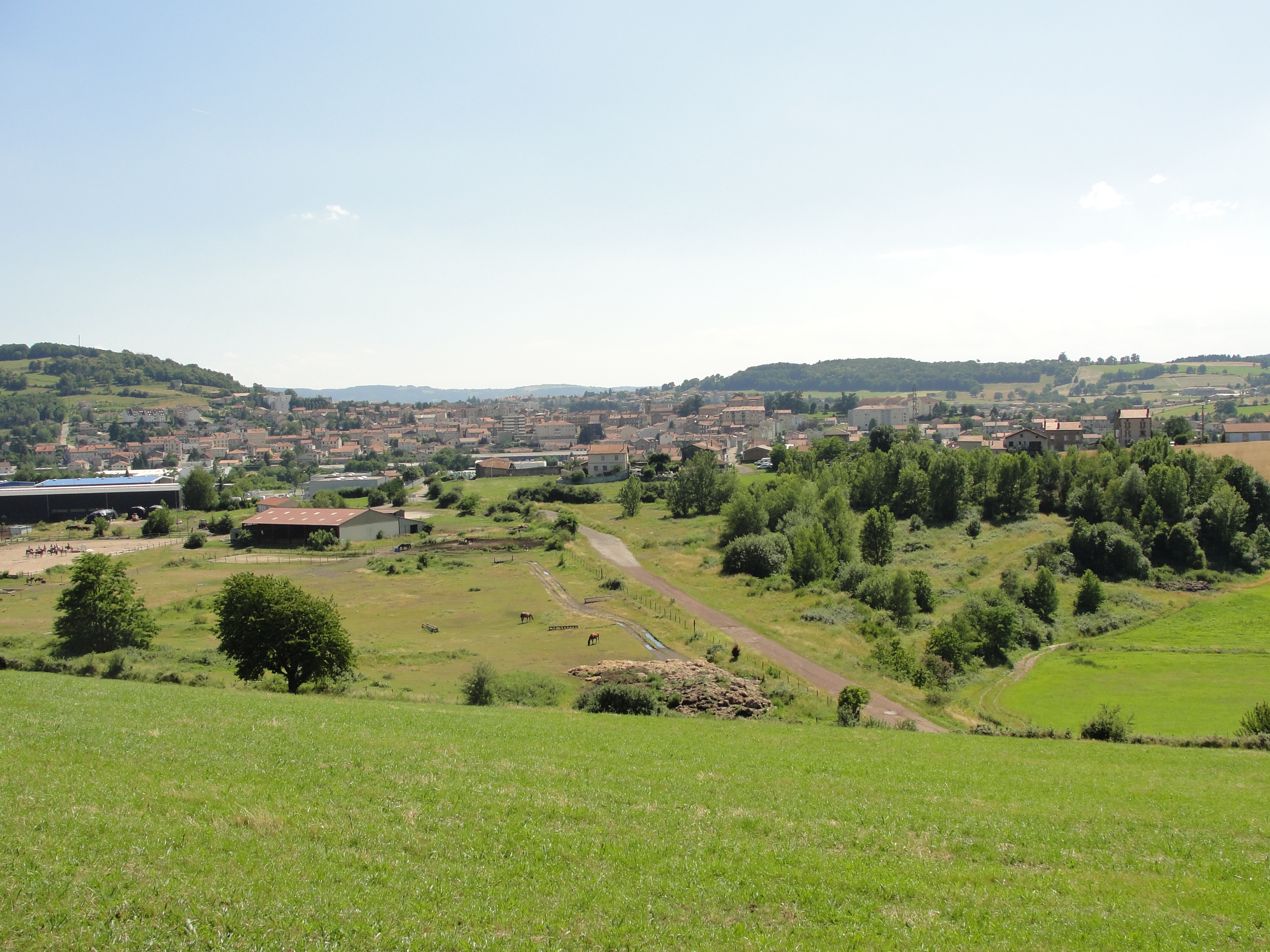

- Coat of arms
- Location of Roche-la-Molière
- Location within France Location within Auvergne-Rhône-Alpes
- Coordinates: 45°26′05″N 4°19′28″E
- Country: France
- Region: Auvergne-Rhône-Alpes
- Department: Loire
- Arrondissement: Saint-Étienne
- Canton: Saint-Étienne-3
- Intercommunality: Saint-Étienne Métropole

Government
  - Mayor (2020–2026): Eric Berlivet
- Area^{1}: 17.44 km^{2} (6.73 sq mi)
- Highest elevation: 700 m (2,300 ft)
- Lowest elevation: 469 m (1,539 ft)
- Population (2023): 9,843
  - Density: 564.4/km^{2} (1,462/sq mi)
- Time zone: UTC+01:00 (CET)
  - Summer (DST): UTC+02:00 (CEST)
- INSEE/Postal code: 42189 /42230
- ^{1} French Land Register data, which excludes lakes, ponds, glaciers > 1 km^{2} (0.386 sq mi or 247 acres) and river estuaries.

Roche-la-Molière (French pronunciation: [ʁɔʃ la mɔljɛʁ]) is a commune in the Loire department in the Auvergne-Rhône-Alpes region in central France.

== Population ==
Historical population

Year	Pop.	±% p.a.
1793	1,362	—
1800	1,031	−3.90%
1806	1,247	+3.22%
1821	1,435	+0.94%
1831	1,289	−1.07%
1836	1,486	+2.89%
1841	1,640	+1.99%
1846	1,749	+1.30%
1851	1,805	+0.63%
1856	2,547	+7.13%
1861	2,353	−1.57%
1866	3,070	+5.46%
1872	3,288	+1.15%
1876	3,843	+3.98%
1881	3,939	+0.49%
1886	3,875	−0.33%
1891	4,386	+2.51%
1896	4,789	+1.77%
1901	5,517	+2.87%

Year	Pop.	±% p.a.
1906	5,803	+1.02%
1911	6,113	+1.05%
1921	7,393	+1.92%
1926	9,570	+5.30%
1931	9,658	+0.18%
1936	8,836	−1.76%
1946	9,916	+1.16%
1954	11,035	+1.35%
1962	11,086	+0.06%
1968	10,614	−0.72%
1975	9,893	−1.00%
1982	9,211	−1.02%
1990	10,103	+1.16%
1999	10,083	−0.02%
2007	10,215	+0.16%
2012	10,242	+0.05%
2017	9,697	−1.09%
2023	9,843	+0.25%

Source: EHESS and INSEE (1968–2023)

== See also ==
- Communes of the Loire department
