= Canton of Saint-Étienne-3 =

Coordinates: 45.44°N 4.38°E

Saint-Étienne-3
- Canton
- Country: France
- Region: Auvergne-Rhône-Alpes
- Department: Loire
- No. of communes: {{{nbcomm}}}
- Population (2023): 42,342
- INSEE code: 42 16

The canton of Saint-Étienne-3 (before 2015: Saint-Étienne-Nord-Ouest-2) is a French administrative division located in the department of Loire and the Auvergne-Rhône-Alpes region. It has the following communes:

- Roche-la-Molière
- Saint-Étienne (partly)
- Saint-Genest-Lerpt

== See also ==
- Cantons of the Loire department
