= Loire coal mining basin =

French mining basin

Loire mining basin location on French coal basins map.

The Loire coal mining basin is an area of France that has been shaped by seven centuries of coal extraction from the 13th century to the 20th century and represents a significant period in the history of European industrialisation.

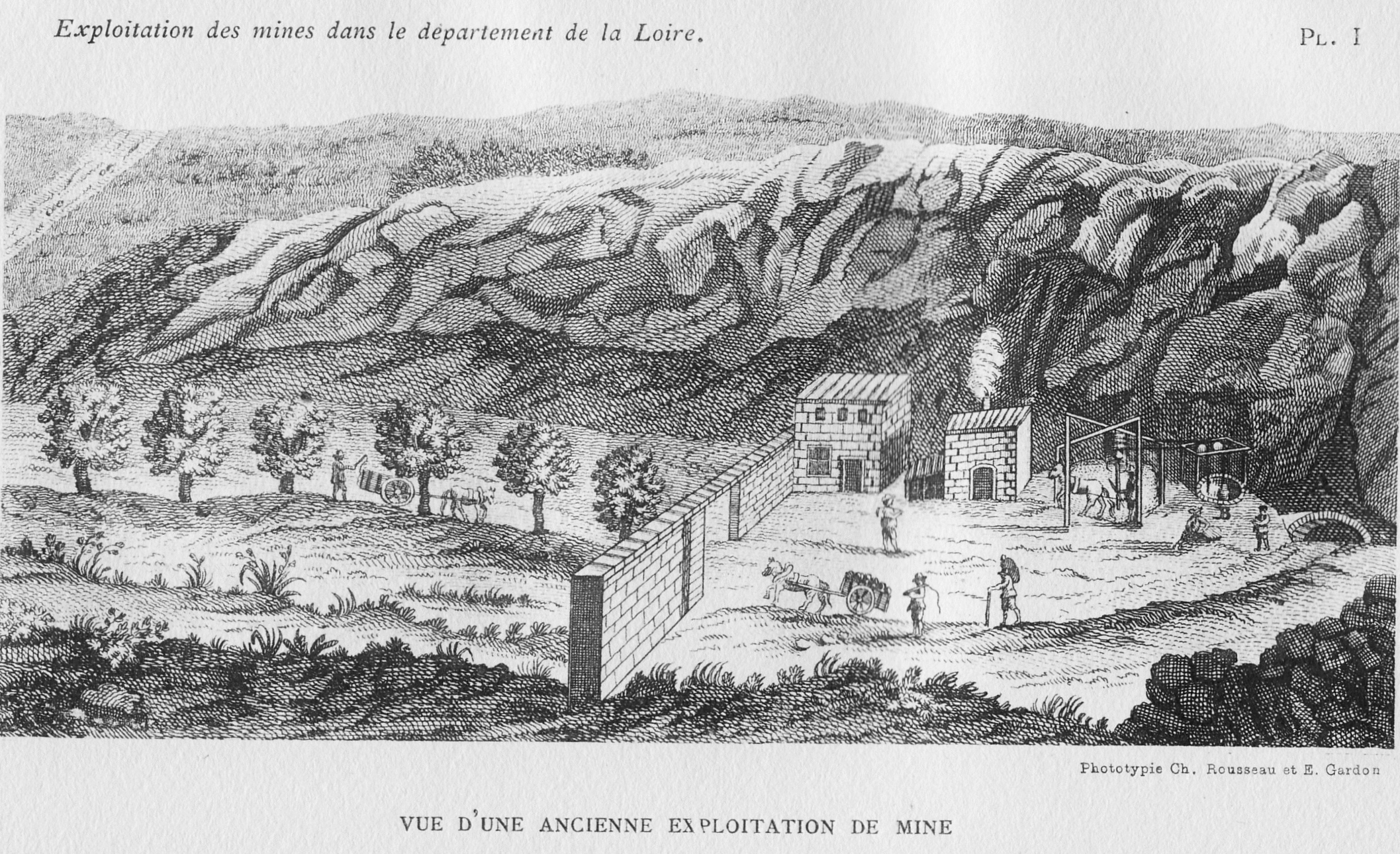
18th-century exploitation.

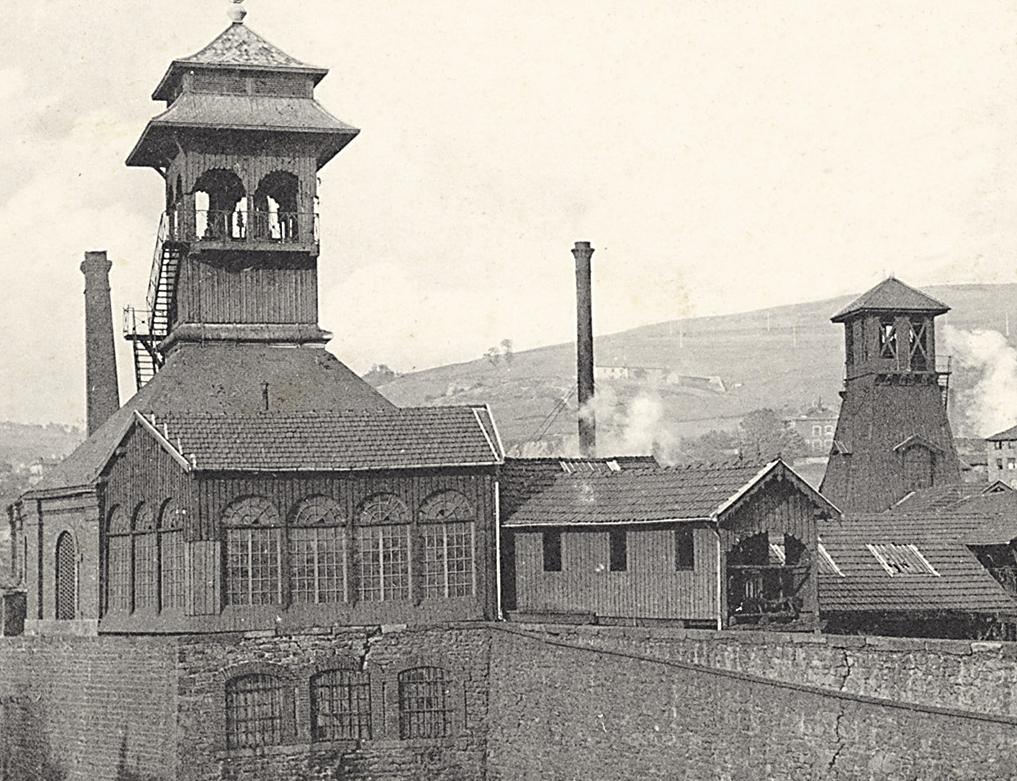
Chatelus schaft at the beginning of the 20th century.

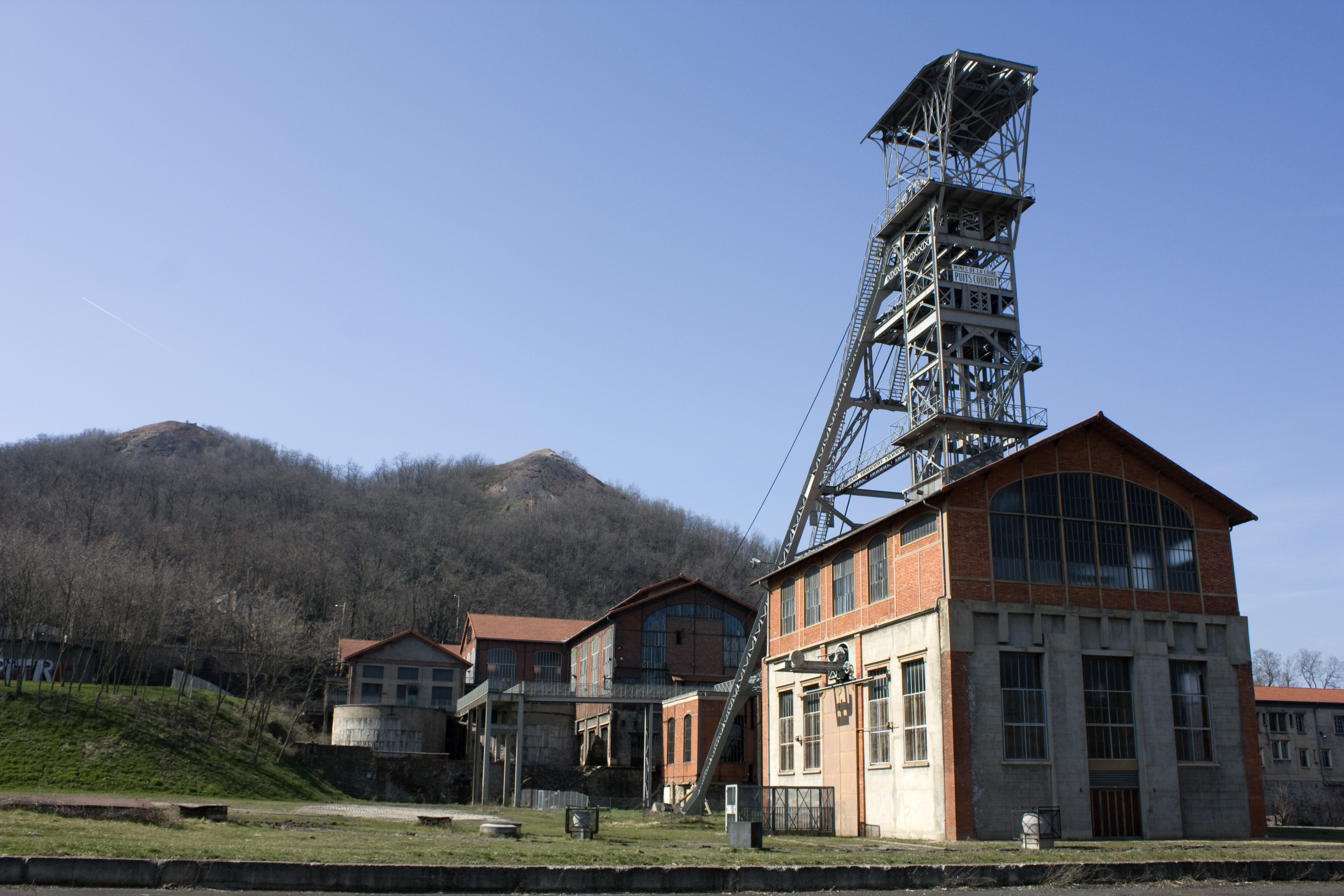
Couriot Shaft became a mining museum in 1991.

== See also ==
- Saint-Étienne Mine Museum
