= Saint-Jean-Bonnefonds =

- Commune
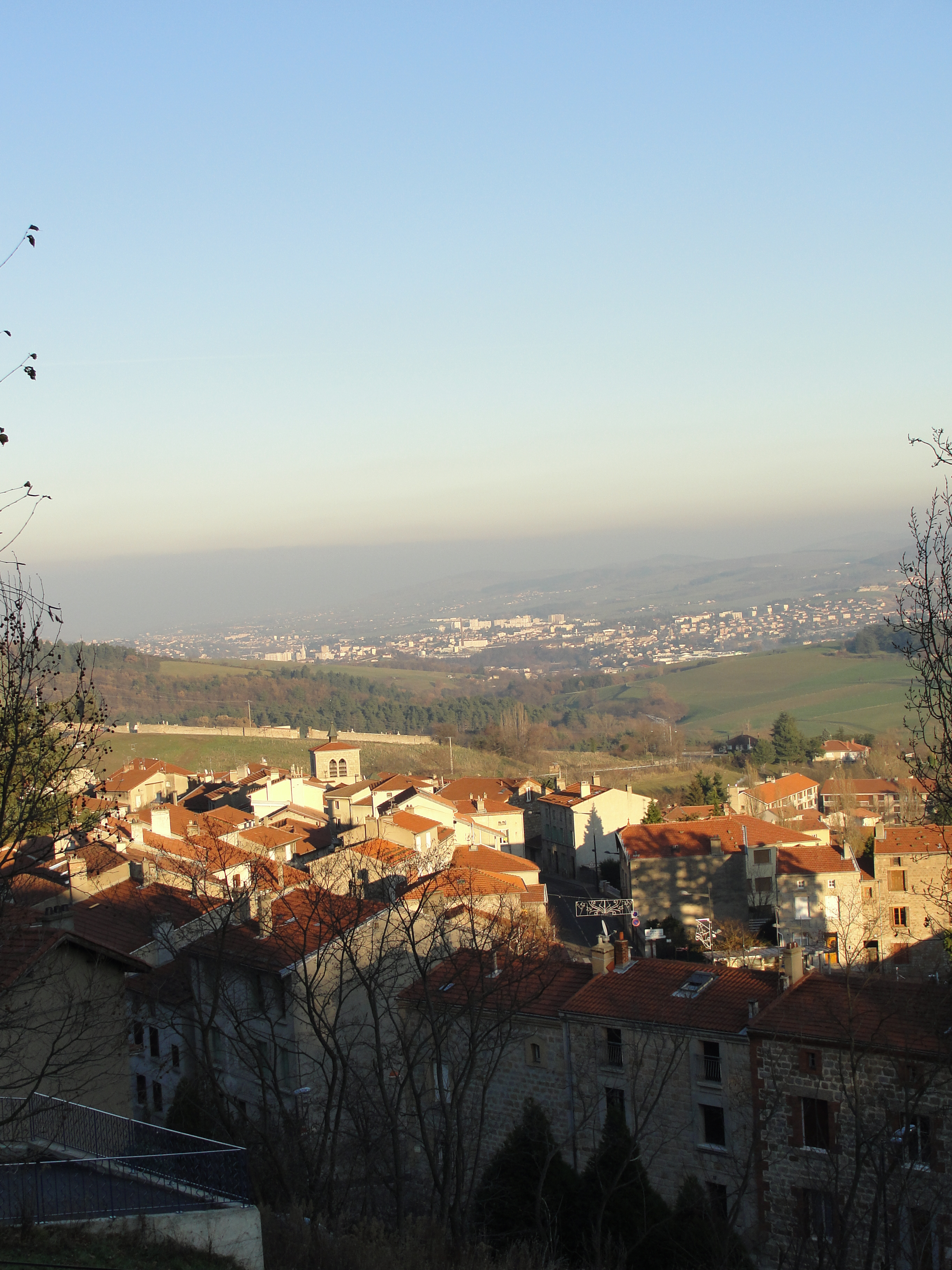

- Coat of arms
- Location of Saint-Jean-Bonnefonds
- Location within France Location within Auvergne-Rhône-Alpes
- Coordinates: 45°27′07″N 4°26′50″E
- Country: France
- Region: Auvergne-Rhône-Alpes
- Department: Loire
- Arrondissement: Saint-Étienne
- Canton: Saint-Étienne-5
- Intercommunality: Saint-Étienne Métropole

Government
  - Mayor (2020–2026): Marc Chavanne
- Area^{1}: 11.59 km^{2} (4.47 sq mi)
- Elevation: 525 m (1,722 ft)
- Highest elevation: 663 m (2,175 ft)
- Lowest elevation: 418 m (1,371 ft)
- Population (2023): 6,563
  - Density: 566.3/km^{2} (1,467/sq mi)
- Time zone: UTC+01:00 (CET)
  - Summer (DST): UTC+02:00 (CEST)
- INSEE/Postal code: 42237 /42650
- ^{1} French Land Register data, which excludes lakes, ponds, glaciers > 1 km^{2} (0.386 sq mi or 247 acres) and river estuaries.

Saint-Jean-Bonnefonds (French pronunciation: [sɛ̃ ʒɑ̃ bɔnfɔ̃]) is a commune in the Loire department in central France.

== Population ==
Historical population

| Year | Pop. | ±% p.a. |
|---|---|---|
| 1793 | 2,285 | — |
| 1800 | 2,189 | −0.61% |
| 1806 | 2,355 | +1.23% |
| 1821 | 2,572 | +0.59% |
| 1831 | 4,022 | +4.57% |
| 1836 | 4,263 | +1.17% |
| 1841 | 4,808 | +2.44% |
| 1846 | 4,630 | −0.75% |
| 1851 | 6,357 | +6.55% |
| 1856 | 8,617 | +6.27% |
| 1861 | 8,898 | +0.64% |
| 1866 | 4,705 | −11.97% |
| 1872 | 4,440 | −0.96% |
| 1876 | 4,316 | −0.71% |
| 1881 | 3,970 | −1.66% |
| 1886 | 4,029 | +0.30% |
| 1891 | 4,167 | +0.68% |
| 1896 | 4,031 | −0.66% |
| 1901 | 4,147 | +0.57% |

| Year | Pop. | ±% p.a. |
|---|---|---|
| 1906 | 3,862 | −1.41% |
| 1911 | 3,784 | −0.41% |
| 1921 | 4,017 | +0.60% |
| 1926 | 4,140 | +0.61% |
| 1931 | 4,124 | −0.08% |
| 1936 | 3,978 | −0.72% |
| 1946 | 3,838 | −0.36% |
| 1954 | 4,388 | +1.69% |
| 1962 | 4,585 | +0.55% |
| 1968 | 4,460 | −0.46% |
| 1975 | 4,943 | +1.48% |
| 1982 | 6,285 | +3.49% |
| 1990 | 6,412 | +0.25% |
| 1999 | 6,089 | −0.57% |
| 2007 | 6,030 | −0.12% |
| 2012 | 6,512 | +1.55% |
| 2017 | 6,638 | +0.38% |
| 2023 | 6,563 | −0.19% |

Source: EHESS and INSEE (1968-2023)

== See also ==
- Communes of the Loire department
