= Canton of Saint-Étienne-6 =

Coordinates: 45.42°N 4.40°E

- Canton
- Situation of the canton of Saint-Étienne-6 in the department of Loire
- Country: France
- Region: Auvergne-Rhône-Alpes
- Department: Loire
- No. of communes: {{{nbcomm}}}
- Population (2023): 41,375
- INSEE code: 4219

The canton of Saint-Étienne-6 is an administrative division of the Loire department, in eastern France. It was created at the French canton reorganisation which came into effect in March 2015. Its seat is in Saint-Étienne.

It consists of the following communes:

1. Saint-Étienne (partly)
