= Saint-Étienne =

Prefecture and commune in Auvergne-Rhône-Alpes, France

Saint-Étienne Sant-Etiève (Franco-Provençal)
- Prefecture and commune
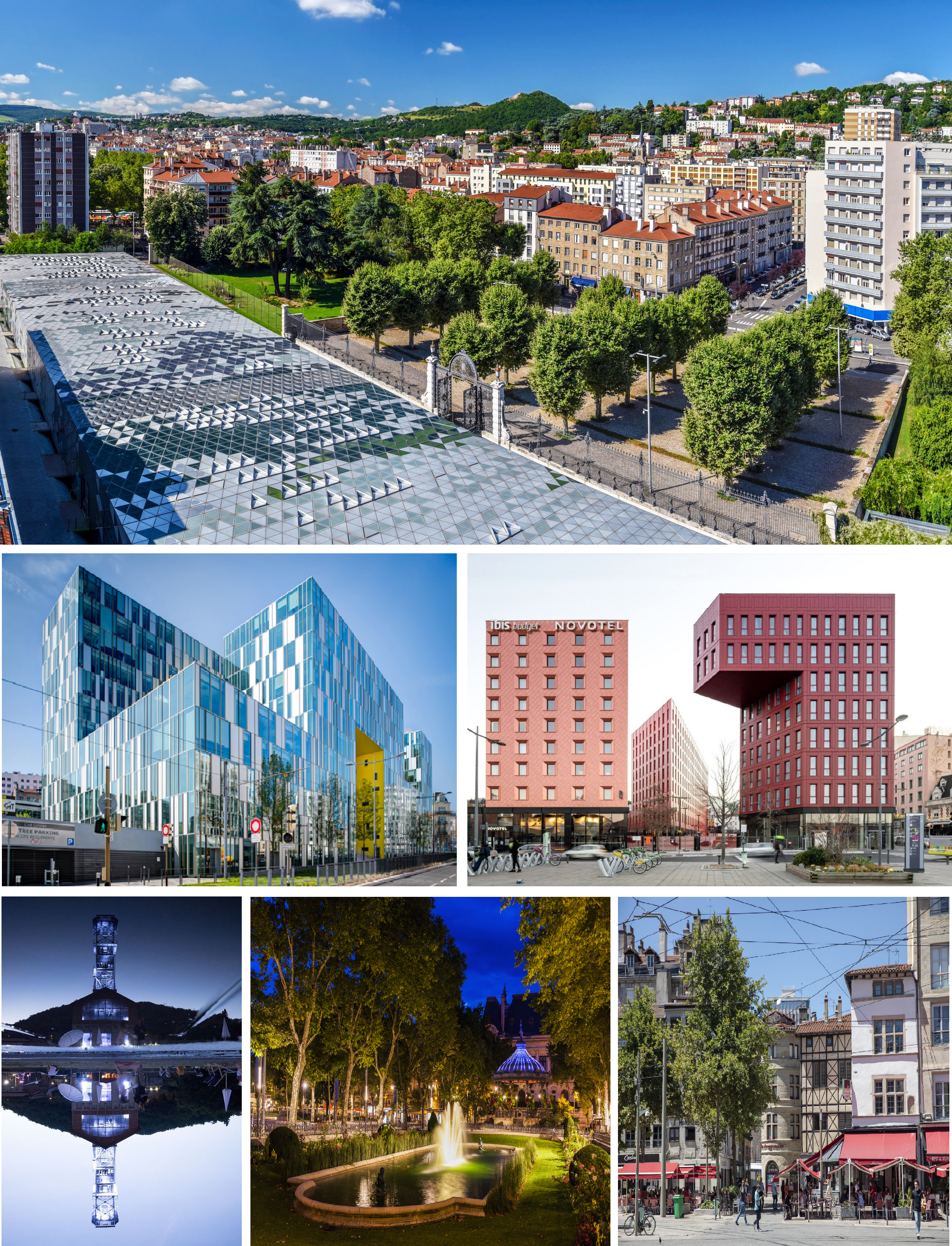
- From top to bottom, left to right: view from the Cité du Design, in the centre the Cité des Affaires and the One Station buildings, below the Musée de la Mine, the Place Jean Jaurès garden and the Place du Peuple.

- Flag Coat of arms
- Location of Saint-Étienne
- Location within France Location within Auvergne-Rhône-Alpes
- Coordinates: 45°26′05″N 4°23′25″E
- Country: France
- Region: Auvergne-Rhône-Alpes
- Department: Loire
- Arrondissement: Saint-Étienne
- Canton: Saint-Étienne-1, 2, 3, 4, 5 and 6
- Intercommunality: Saint-Étienne Métropole

Government
  - Mayor (2026–32): Régis Juanico (G)
- Area^{1}: 79.97 km^{2} (30.88 sq mi)
  - Urban (2020): 414 km^{2} (160 sq mi)
  - Metro (2020): 1,636 km^{2} (632 sq mi)
- Elevation: 516 m (1,693 ft)
- Highest elevation: 1,117 m (3,665 ft)
- Lowest elevation: 422 m (1,385 ft)
- Population (2023): 173,136
  - Rank: 14th in France
  - Density: 2,165/km^{2} (5,607/sq mi)
  - Urban (2023): 376,371
  - Urban density: 909/km^{2} (2,350/sq mi)
  - Metro (2023): 503,351
  - Metro density: 307.7/km^{2} (796.9/sq mi)
- Demonym(s): Stéphanois (m), Stéphanoises (f)
- Time zone: UTC+01:00 (CET)
  - Summer (DST): UTC+02:00 (CEST)
- INSEE/Postal code: 42218 /42000, 42100, 42230
- Website: saint-etienne.fr
- ^{1} French Land Register data, which excludes lakes, ponds, glaciers > 1 km^{2} (0.386 sq mi or 247 acres) and river estuaries.

Saint-Étienne (French pronunciation: [sɛ̃t‿etjɛn]; Franco-Provençal: Sant-Etiève), also written St. Etienne, is a city and the prefecture of the Loire département, in eastern-central France, in the Massif Central, 60 km (37 mi) southwest of Lyon, in the Auvergne-Rhône-Alpes region.

Saint-Étienne is the thirteenth most populated commune in France and the second most populated commune in Auvergne-Rhône-Alpes. Its metropolis (métropole), Saint-Étienne Métropole, is the second most populous regional metropolis after Lyon. The commune is also at the heart of a vast metropolitan area with 503,351 inhabitants (2023), the eighteenth largest in France by population, comprising 105 communes. Its inhabitants are known as Stéphanois (masculine) and Stéphanoises (feminine).

Long known as the French city of the "weapon, cycle and ribbon" and a major coal mining centre, Saint-Étienne is currently engaged in a vast urban renewal program aimed at leading the transition from the industrial city inherited from the 19th century to the "design capital" of the 21st century. This approach was recognised with the entry of Saint-Étienne into the UNESCO Creative Cities network in 2010. The city is currently undergoing renewal, with the installation of the Châteaucreux business district, the ‘Steel’ retail complex and the manufacturing creative district.

The city is known for its football club AS Saint-Étienne, which won the Ligue 1 title ten times between 1956/57 and 1980/81).

== History ==
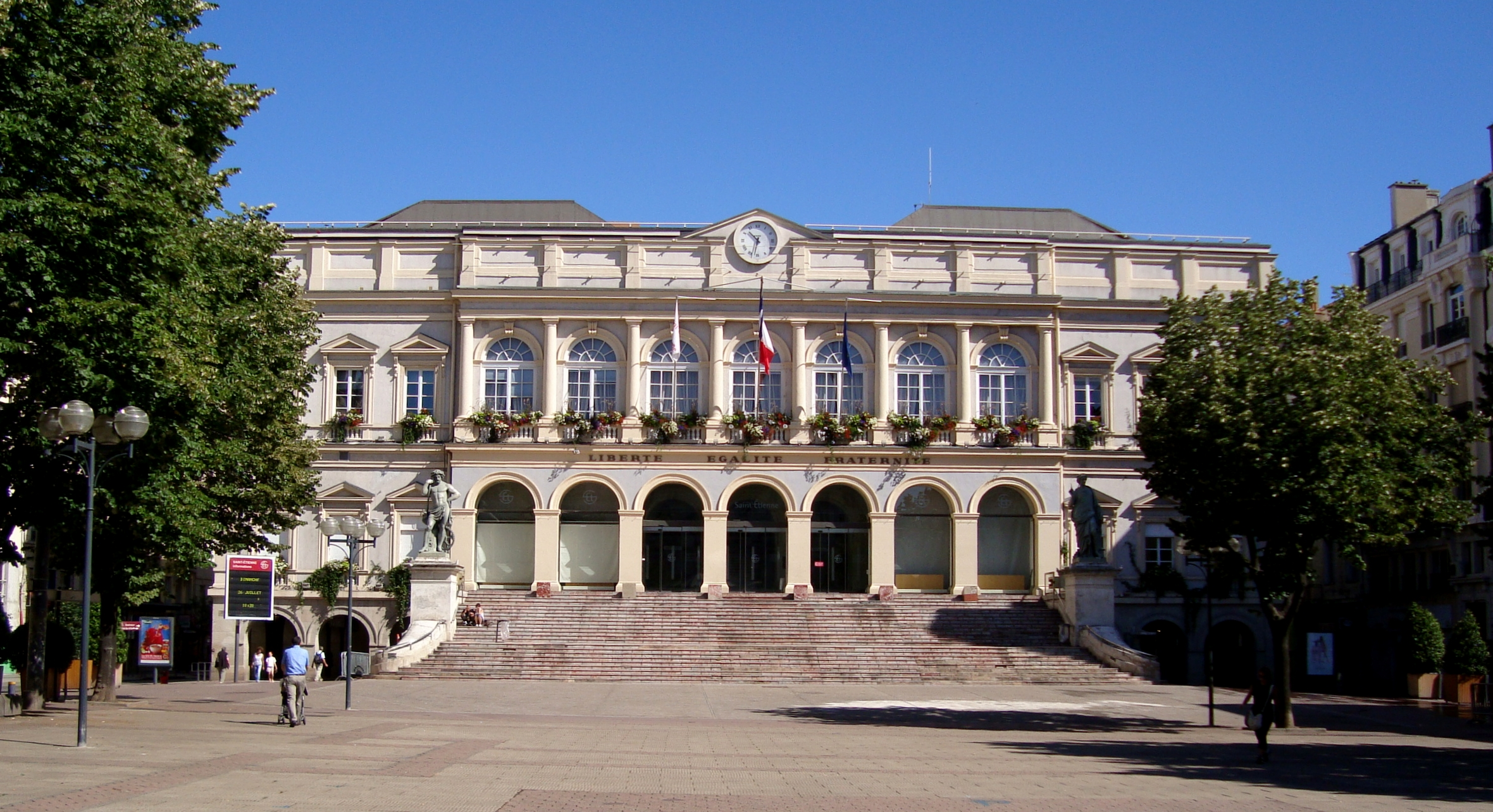
The Hôtel de Ville

Named after Saint Stephen, the city first appears in the historical record in the Middle Ages as Saint-Étienne de Furan (after the River Furan, a tributary of the Loire). At the close of the 12th century St Étienne was a parish of the Pays de Gier belonging to the abbey of Valbenoîte. In the 13th century, it was a small borough around the church dedicated to Saint Stephen. On the upper reaches of the Furan, near the Way of St. James, the Abbey of Valbenoîte had been founded by the Cistercians in 1222. At the beginning of the 15th century Charles VII permitted the town to erect fortifications. In the late 15th century, it was a fortified village defended by walls built around the original nucleus.

From the 16th century, Saint-Étienne developed an arms manufacturing industry and became a market town. It was this which accounted for the town's importance, although it also became a centre for the manufacture of ribbons and passementerie starting in the 17th century.

Later, it became a mining centre of the Loire coal mining basin. The Hôtel de Ville (City Hall) was completed in 1830.

In the first half of the 19th century, it was only a chief town of an arrondissement in the département of the Loire, with a population of 33,064 in 1832. The concentration of industry prompted these numbers to rise rapidly to 110,000 by about 1880. It was this growing importance of Saint-Étienne that led to its being made seat of the prefecture and the departmental administration on 25 July 1855, when it became the chief town in the département and seat of the prefect, replacing Montbrison, which was reduced to the status of chief town of an arrondissement. Saint-Étienne absorbed the commune of Valbenoîte and several other neighbouring localities on 31 March 1855.

During the repression of January and February 1894, the police conducted raids targeting the anarchists living there, without much success.

== Demographics ==
The population data in the table and graph below refer to the commune of Saint-Étienne proper, in its geography at the given years. The commune of Saint-Étienne absorbed the former communes of Beaubrun, Montaud, Outre-Furent and Valbenoîte in 1855, ceded Planfoy in 1863, merged with the exclave Saint-Victor-sur-Loire and with Terrenoire in 1969 and Rochetaillée in 1973.

Historical population

Year	Pop.	±% p.a.
1793	25,000	—
1800	16,259	−5.96%
1806	18,035	+1.74%
1821	19,102	+0.38%
1831	33,064	+5.64%
1836	41,534	+4.67%
1841	48,554	+3.17%
1846	49,614	+0.43%
1851	56,003	+2.45%
1856	94,432	+11.01%
1861	92,250	−0.47%
1866	96,620	+0.93%
1872	110,814	+2.31%
1876	126,019	+3.27%
1881	123,813	−0.35%
1886	117,875	−0.98%
1891	133,443	+2.51%
1896	136,030	+0.38%
1901	146,559	+1.50%

Year	Pop.	±% p.a.
1906	146,788	+0.03%
1911	148,656	+0.25%
1921	167,967	+1.23%
1926	193,737	+2.90%
1931	191,088	−0.27%
1936	190,236	−0.09%
1946	177,966	−0.66%
1954	181,730	+0.26%
1962	210,311	+1.84%
1968	223,223	+1.00%
1975	220,181	−0.20%
1982	204,955	−1.02%
1990	199,396	−0.34%
1999	180,210	−1.12%
2007	175,318	−0.34%
2012	171,483	−0.44%
2017	172,565	+0.13%
2023	173,136	+0.06%

Source: EHESS and INSEE (1968–2023)

== Culture ==
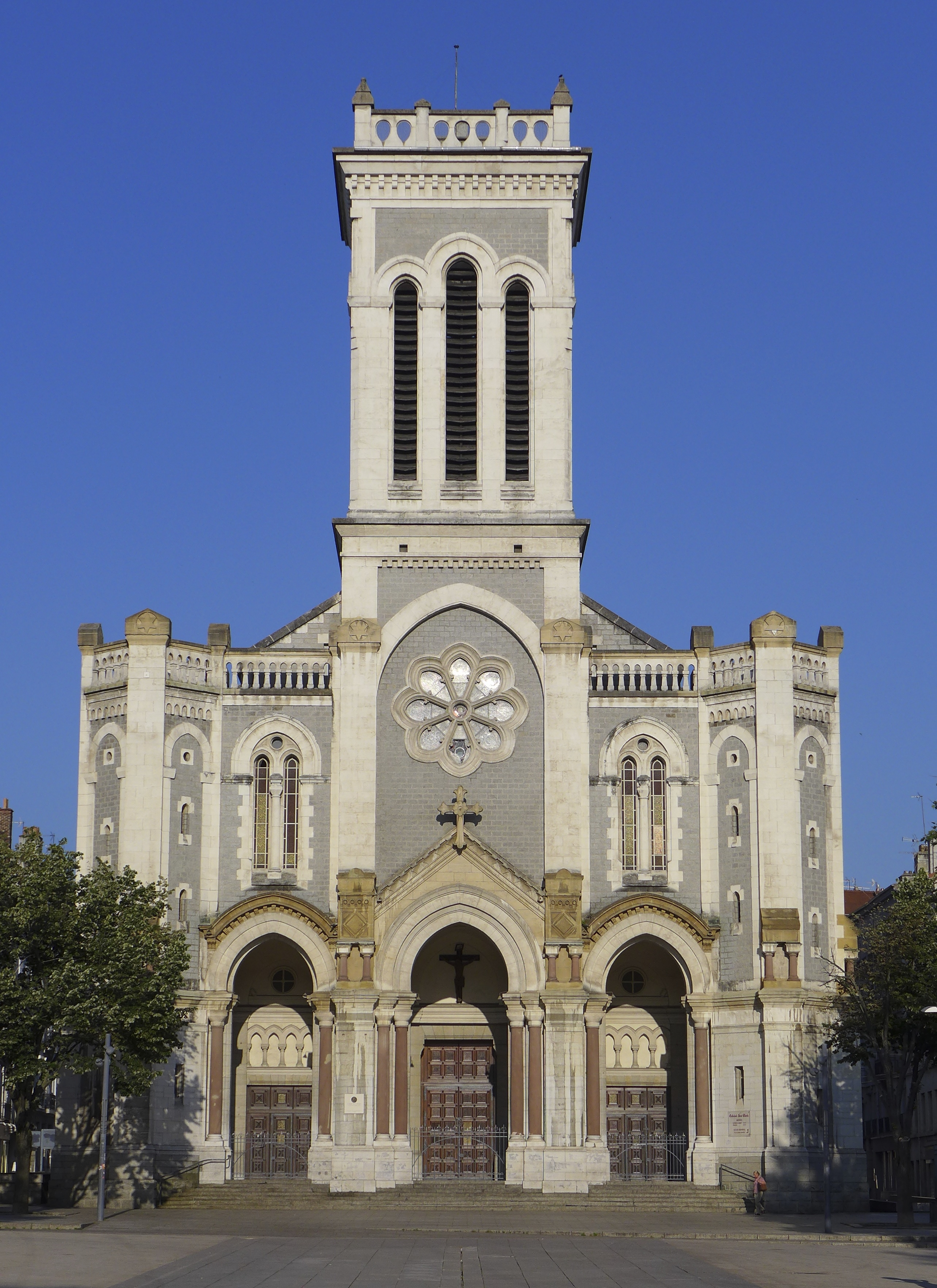
Saint-Étienne Cathedral

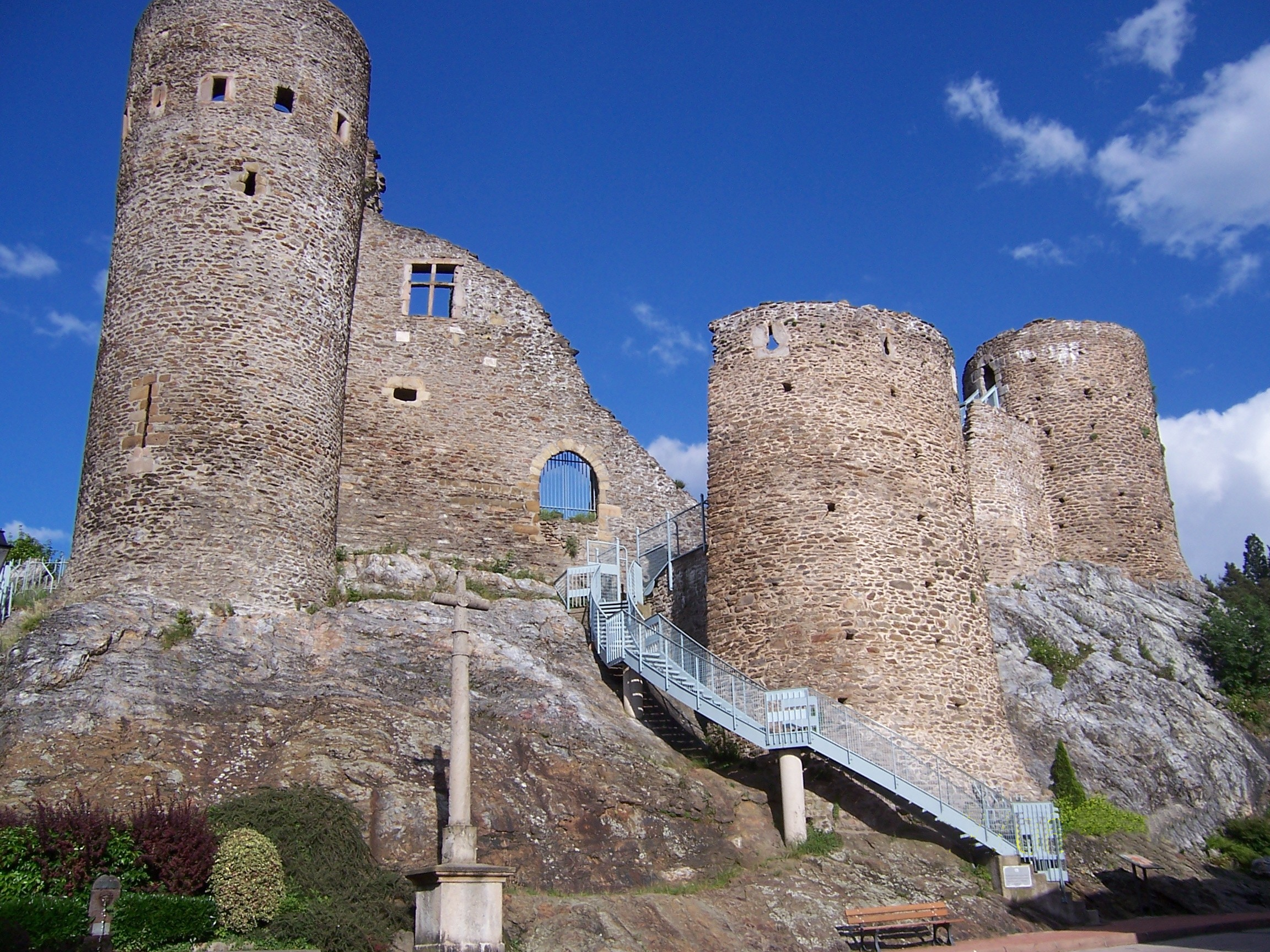
Rochetaillée Castle

Saint-Étienne became a popular stop for automobile travelers in the early 20th century.

In 1998, Saint-Étienne set up a design biennale, the largest of its kind in France. It lasts around two weeks. A landmark in the history of the importance ascribed to design in Saint-Étienne was the inauguration of La Cité du design on the site of the former arms factory in 2009.

The city also launched the Massenet Festivals, (the composer Jules Massenet hailed from the area) devoted mainly to perform Massenet's operas. In 2000, the city was named one of the French Towns and Lands of Art and History. On 22 November 2010, it was nominated as "City of Design" as part of UNESCO's Creative Cities Network.

Saint-Étienne has four museums:

1. the Musée d'Art Moderne has one of the largest collections of modern and contemporary art in France
2. Musée de la Mine
3. Musée d'Art et d'Industrie (fr)
4. Musée du vieux Saint-Étienne (fr)

Saint-Étienne has 38 Monuments historiques, 6 buildings labeled architecture contemporaine remarquable (remarkable contemporary architecture), 2 sites classés (classified sites) and 5 sites patrimoniaux remarquables (remarkable heritage sites).

== Climate ==
The climate is temperate at the weather station due to its low altitude, but Saint-Étienne itself is much higher, above 530 m (1,739 ft) in the centre, as well as even above 700 m (2,297 ft) in the southern parts of the city. Saint-Étienne is very close to a warm-summer humid continental climate (Köppen: Dfb); it is generally one of the snowiest cities in France, with an average of 85 cm (2.79 ft) of snow accumulation per year.

Climate data for Saint-Étienne–Bouthéon Airport (1991–2020 normals, extremes 1946–present), Alt: 400 m / 1312 ft
Month	Jan	Feb	Mar	Apr	May	Jun	Jul	Aug	Sep	Oct	Nov	Dec	Year
Record high °C (°F)	20.0 (68.0)	23.2 (73.8)	26.4 (79.5)	28.8 (83.8)	33.7 (92.7)	37.8 (100.0)	41.1 (106.0)	39.3 (102.7)	36.0 (96.8)	29.2 (84.6)	25.2 (77.4)	20.2 (68.4)	41.1 (106.0)
Mean daily maximum °C (°F)	7.3 (45.1)	8.8 (47.8)	13.1 (55.6)	16.3 (61.3)	20.3 (68.5)	24.5 (76.1)	26.9 (80.4)	26.9 (80.4)	22.2 (72.0)	17.3 (63.1)	11.4 (52.5)	8.0 (46.4)	16.9 (62.4)
Daily mean °C (°F)	3.8 (38.8)	4.5 (40.1)	7.8 (46.0)	10.7 (51.3)	14.6 (58.3)	18.5 (65.3)	20.7 (69.3)	20.6 (69.1)	16.4 (61.5)	12.7 (54.9)	7.6 (45.7)	4.6 (40.3)	11.9 (53.4)
Mean daily minimum °C (°F)	0.3 (32.5)	0.2 (32.4)	2.6 (36.7)	5.0 (41.0)	9.0 (48.2)	12.6 (54.7)	14.4 (57.9)	14.2 (57.6)	10.7 (51.3)	8.1 (46.6)	3.7 (38.7)	1.1 (34.0)	6.9 (44.4)
Record low °C (°F)	−25.6 (−14.1)	−22.5 (−8.5)	−13.9 (7.0)	−7.4 (18.7)	−3.9 (25.0)	−0.6 (30.9)	2.9 (37.2)	1.1 (34.0)	−2.6 (27.3)	−6.2 (20.8)	−10.6 (12.9)	−18.6 (−1.5)	−25.6 (−14.1)
Average precipitation mm (inches)	38.3 (1.51)	30.3 (1.19)	33.9 (1.33)	55.0 (2.17)	81.5 (3.21)	80.8 (3.18)	77.2 (3.04)	72.8 (2.87)	70.3 (2.77)	76.2 (3.00)	73.0 (2.87)	39.0 (1.54)	728.3 (28.67)
Average precipitation days (≥ 1.0 mm)	7.8	7.0	7.1	9.2	10.1	8.8	7.8	7.6	7.5	8.7	8.7	7.6	97.9
Average snowy days	5.1	5.8	2.5	1.1	0.0	0.0	0.0	0.0	0.0	0.0	1.5	4.6	20.5
Average relative humidity (%)	81	78	73	71	72	72	68	71	75	80	81	83	75.4
Mean monthly sunshine hours	81.4	108.6	162.3	186.2	213.7	240.7	275.1	259.1	193.2	134.7	87.6	75.8	2,018.4
Source 1: Météo France
Source 2: Infoclimat.fr (humidity, 1961–1990)

== Sport ==
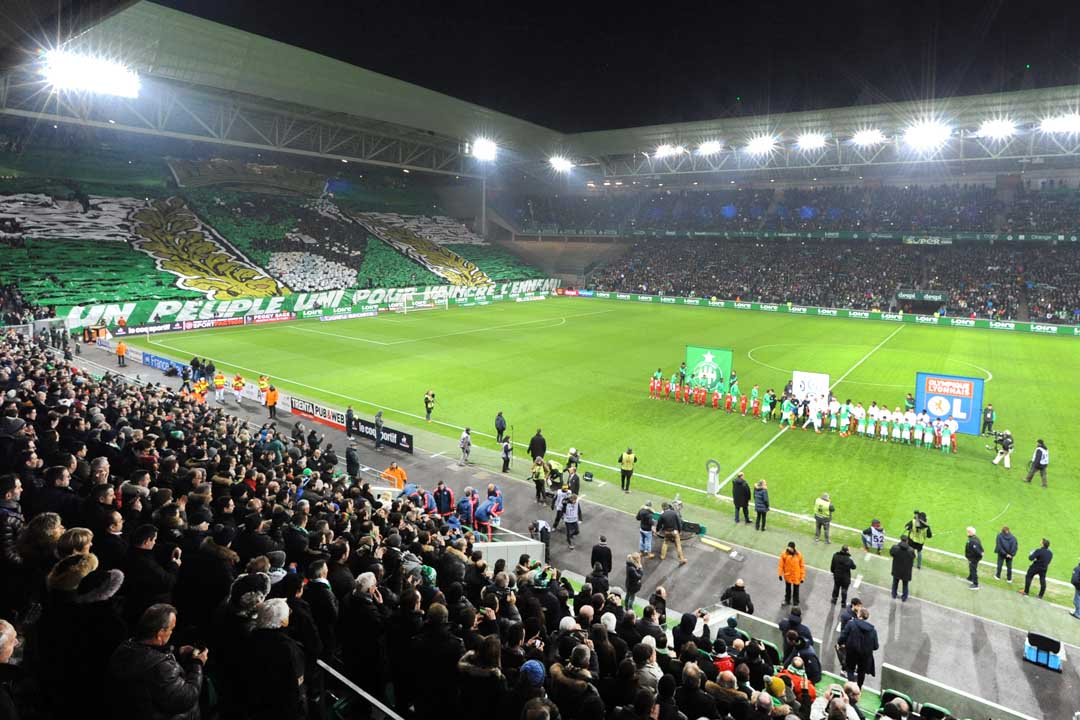
Stade Geoffroy-Guichard, home of the AS Saint-Étienne football club

The city's football club AS Saint-Étienne has won the Ligue 1 title a joint-record ten times, achieving most of their success in the 1970s. The British indie-dance band Saint Etienne named themselves after the club.

Saint-Étienne has a number of sports stadiums, the largest being Stade Geoffroy-Guichard used for football and Stade Henri-Lux for athletics. St. Étienne was the capital of the French bicycle industry. The bicycle wheel manufacturer Mavic is based in the city and frame manufacturers Motobécane and Vitus are also based here. The city often hosts a stage of the Tour de France.

Saint-Étienne resident Thierry Gueorgiou is a world champion in orienteering. The local rugby union team is CA Saint-Étienne Loire Sud Rugby.

== Transport ==
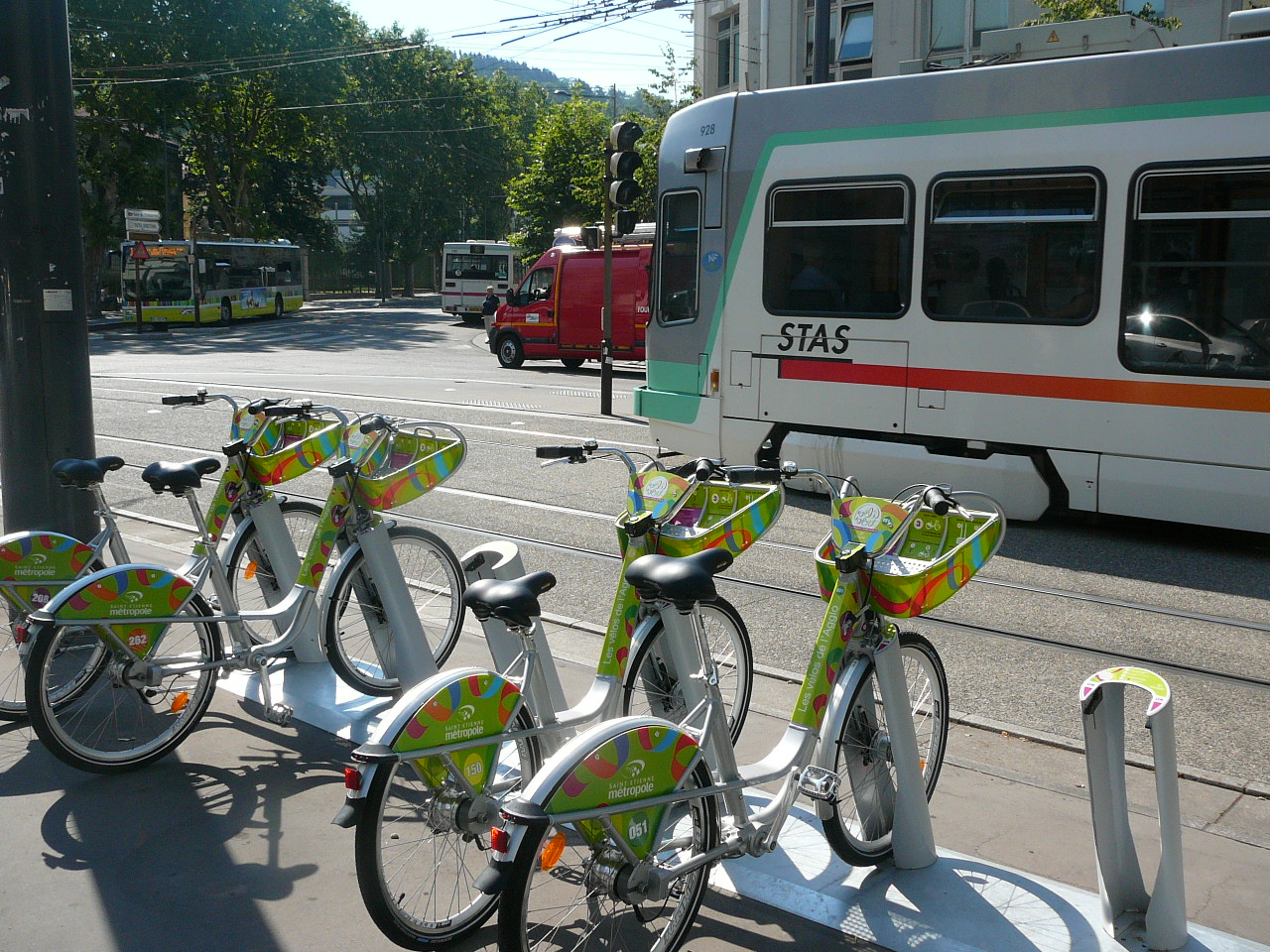
Tramway, bus and bicycles run by STAS (Société de Transports de l'Agglomération Stéphanoise)

The nearest airport is Saint-Étienne–Bouthéon Airport which is located in Andrézieux-Bouthéon, 12 km (7.46 mi) north-northwest of Saint-Étienne. As of 2024, there are no scheduled services to and from the airport, although there are occasional holiday charters, mainly to Mediterranean destinations. The nearest major airport is Lyon–Saint-Exupéry Airport which is located 77 km (48 mi) to north east of the city centre.

The main railway station is Saint-Étienne-Châteaucreux station, which offers high-speed services to Paris and Lyon (Saint-Étienne–Lyon railway), as well as connects to several regional lines. There are four other railway stations in Saint-Étienne (Bellevue, Carnot, La Terrasse and Le Clapier) with local services.

Bus and tram transport is regulated and provided by the Société de Transports de l'Agglomération Stéphanoise (STAS), a public transport executive organisation. The Saint-Étienne tramway is notable as the oldest tramway in France. By the early 1980s, it was one of just three French tram systems, along with those of Lille and Marseille, remaining in operation – until the opening of a new system in Nantes in 1985 began a tramway revival in the country. The Saint-Étienne trolleybus system is one of only four such systems currently operating in France.

The bicycle sharing system Vélivert with 280 short term renting bicycles has been available since June 2010.

== Colleges and universities ==
- Jean Monnet University
- École d'Économie - Saint-Étienne School of Economics (SE²)
- École Nationale Supérieure des Mines de Saint-Étienne (EMSE or ENSMSE)
- École nationale d'ingénieurs de Saint-Étienne (ENISE)
- Telecom Saint Étienne (TSE)
- École National Supérieure d'Architecture de Saint-Étienne (ENSASE)

== Notable people ==
Saint-Étienne was the birthplace of:

- Jean Chaleyé (1878–1960), painter and lace designer, born in Saint-Étienne
- René Diaz (born 1926), French journalist and illustrator
- Augustin Dupré (1748–1833), engraver of French coins and medals, France's 14th graveur général des monnaies
- Claude Fauriel (1772–1844), historian, philologist and critic
- Saint Marcellin Champagnat (1789–1840), Catholic priest and founding members of the Society of Mary (Marist Fathers) who founded the Marist Brothers and was canonised in 1999
- Antonin Moine (1796–1849), sculptor
- Jules Janin (1804–1874), writer and critic
- Paul Jean Rigollot (1810-1873), pharmacist and inventor
- Francis Garnier (1839–1873), officer and explorer who explored the Mekong River, much to the surprise of the inhabitants
- Lucie Grange (1839–1908), medium, feminist prophet and newspaper founder
- Jules Massenet (1842–1912), composer, best known for his operas
- Paul de Vivie, aka Velocio (1853–1930), publisher of Le Cycliste, early champion of the derailleur and father of French cycle touring
- Claudine Chomat (1915–1995), feminist and communist activist, member of the French Resistance during World War II
- Jean Bonfils (1921–2007), classical organist and composer
- André Bourgey (1936), geographer
- Jean-Michel Othoniel (1963), contemporary artist
- Bernard Lavilliers (born 1946) (Bernard Ouillon), singer
- Orlan (1947–), contemporary artist
- Willy Sagnol (born 1977), French International football player
- Jean Guitton (1901–1999), Catholic philosopher and theologian
- Thierry Gueorgiou (born 1979), Orienteering world champion
- Norma Ray (born 1970), singer
- Alexis Ajinça (born 1988), basketball player
- Sylvain Armand (born 1980), footballer
- Sliimy (born 1988), singer
- Aravane Rezai (born 1987), tennis player
- Loïc Perrin (born 1985), footballer
- Théophile Naël (born 2007), racing driver

It was also the place where Andrei Kivilev died.

== International relations ==
Saint-Étienne is twinned with:

Annaba, Algeria, since 1982; Ben Arous, Tunisia, since 1994; Bobo Dioulasso, Burkina Faso, since 2009; Coventry, United Kingdom, since 1955; Des Moines, Iowa, United States, since 1984; Ferrara, Italy, since 1960; Geltendorf, Germany, since 1966; Granby, Quebec, Canada, since 1960; Katowice, Poland, since 1994	Luhansk, Ukraine, since 1959; Monastir, Tunisia, since 2012; Oeiras, Portugal, since 1995; Patras, Greece, since 1990; Toamasina, Madagascar, since 1967; Windsor, Ontario, Canada, since 1963; Wuppertal, Germany, since 1960; Xúzhōu, China, since 1984; Kapan, Armenia, since 2023; Yerevan, Armenia, since 2023

== See also ==
- André César Vermare, sculptor of Franco-Prussian war memorial
- Manufacture d'armes de Saint-Étienne
- Médiathèques de Saint-Étienne
- Saint-Étienne – Gorges de la Loire Nature Reserve
- Saint-Étienne Cathedral
