= Villars, Loire =

Villars
- Commune
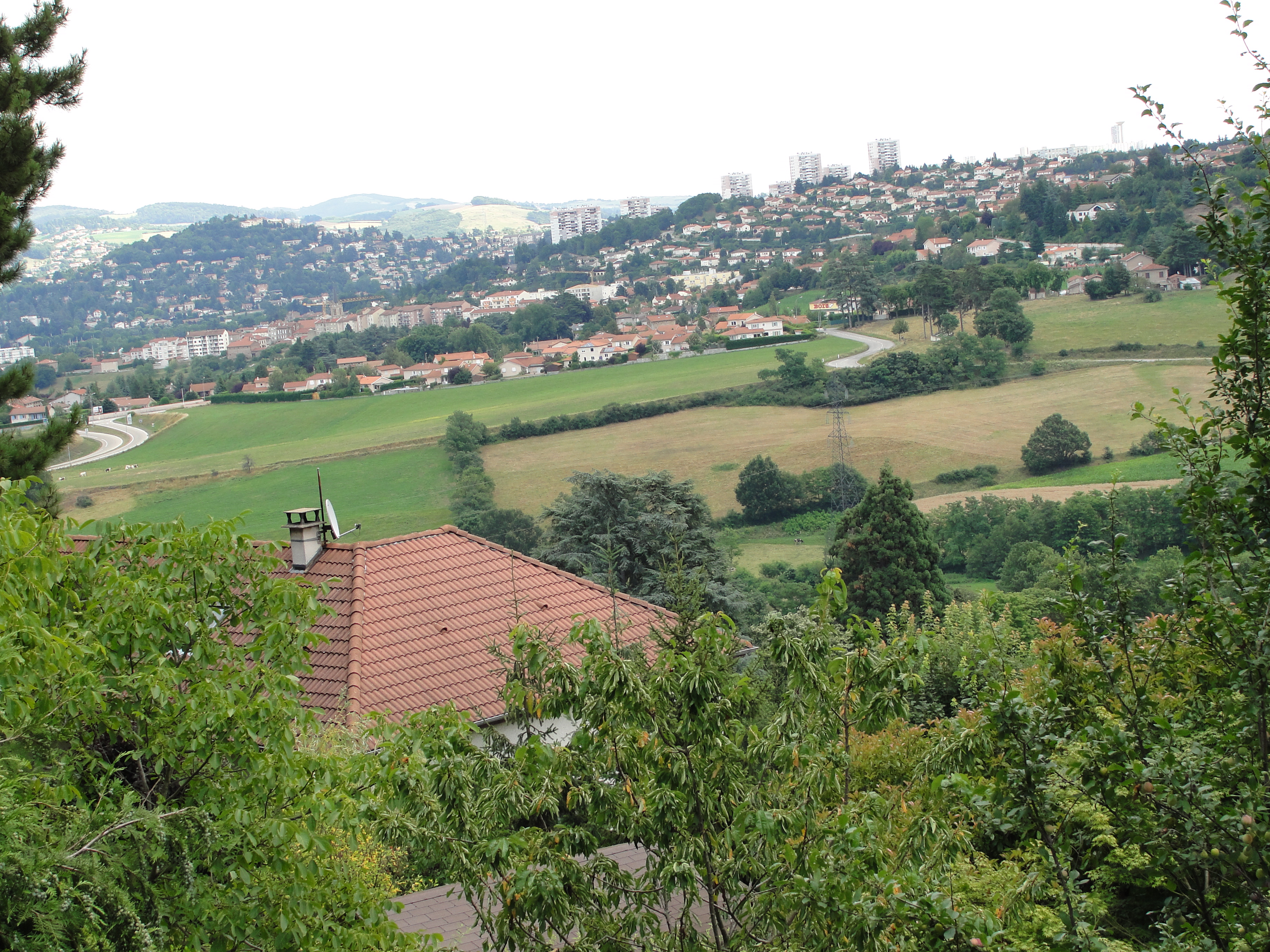

- Coat of arms
- Location of Villars
- Location within France Location within Auvergne-Rhône-Alpes
- Coordinates: 45°28′11″N 4°21′19″E
- Country: France
- Region: Auvergne-Rhône-Alpes
- Department: Loire
- Arrondissement: Saint-Étienne
- Canton: Saint-Étienne-4
- Intercommunality: Saint-Étienne Métropole

Government
  - Mayor (2020–2026): Jordan Da Silva
- Area^{1}: 5.72 km^{2} (2.21 sq mi)
- Elevation: 480 m (1,570 ft)
- Highest elevation: 600 m (2,000 ft)
- Lowest elevation: 428 m (1,404 ft)
- Population (2023): 7,664
  - Density: 1,340/km^{2} (3,470/sq mi)
- Time zone: UTC+01:00 (CET)
  - Summer (DST): UTC+02:00 (CEST)
- INSEE/Postal code: 42330 /42390
- ^{1} French Land Register data, which excludes lakes, ponds, glaciers > 1 km^{2} (0.386 sq mi or 247 acres) and river estuaries.

Villars (French pronunciation: [vilaʁ]) is a commune in the Loire department in central France.

Villars is a former mining town.

== Population ==
Historical population

Year	Pop.	±% p.a.
1793	560	—
1800	478	−2.24%
1806	507	+0.99%
1821	616	+1.31%
1831	618	+0.03%
1836	580	−1.26%
1841	702	+3.89%
1846	831	+3.43%
1851	877	+1.08%
1856	1,140	+5.39%
1861	1,525	+5.99%
1866	1,803	+3.41%
1872	1,741	−0.58%
1876	2,059	+4.28%
1881	2,224	+1.55%
1886	2,375	+1.32%
1891	2,512	+1.13%
1896	2,512	+0.00%
1901	2,787	+2.10%

Year	Pop.	±% p.a.
1906	2,854	+0.48%
1911	2,989	+0.93%
1921	3,063	+0.24%
1926	3,187	+0.80%
1931	3,061	−0.80%
1936	2,811	−1.69%
1946	2,866	+0.19%
1954	3,174	+1.28%
1962	3,397	+0.85%
1968	3,720	+1.53%
1975	6,828	+9.06%
1982	7,529	+1.41%
1990	8,189	+1.06%
1999	8,494	+0.41%
2007	7,999	−0.75%
2012	7,887	−0.28%
2017	7,970	+0.21%
2023	7,664	−0.65%

Source: EHESS and INSEE (1968-2023)

== Twin towns ==
- Halberstadt, Germany, since 15 November 2003
- Torredembarra, Spain, since 2 September 1984

== See also ==
- Communes of the Loire department
