= François-Jean de la Barre =

Frenchman executed for blasphemy and sacrilege

François-Jean Lefebvre de la Barre
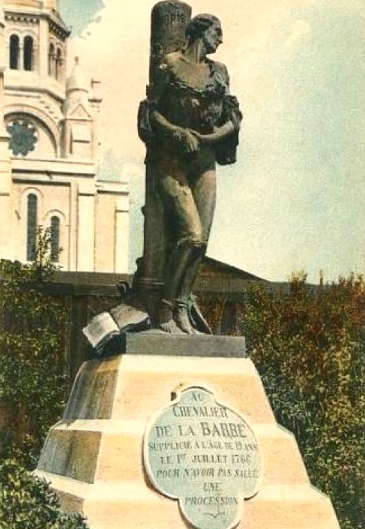
- First statue of the Chevalier de la Barre at the gates of the Sacré-Cœur de Montmartre
- Born: 12 September 1745; Château de Férolles-en-Brie, France
- Died: 1 July 1766 (aged 20); Abbeville, Somme, Picardy, France
- Other names: Jean-François Lefebvre de la Barre
- Known for: French icon for the victims of religious intolerance
- Title: Chevalier (Knight)
- Criminal charges: Blasphemy; Sacrilege
- Criminal penalty: Torture; Execution
- Parent(s): Jean Baptiste Alexandre Lefebvre; Charlotte Claude Niepce

François-Jean Lefebvre de la Barre (French: [də la baʁ]; 12 September 1745 – 1 July 1766) was a French nobleman. He was tortured and beheaded before his body was burnt on a pyre along with Voltaire's Philosophical Dictionary nailed to his torso. La Barre is often said to have been executed for not saluting a Catholic religious procession, though other charges of a similar nature were laid against him.

In France, Lefebvre de la Barre is widely regarded a symbol of the victims of Catholic religious intolerance, along with Jean Calas and Pierre-Paul Sirven, all championed by Voltaire. A statue to de la Barre stands near the Basilica of the Sacred Heart of Jesus of Paris at the summit of the butte Montmartre (itself named from the Temple of Mars), the highest point in Paris, and an 18th arrondissement street nearby the Sacré-Cœur is also named after Lefebvre de la Barre.

Lefebvre de la Barre was a descendant of Antoine Lefèbvre de La Barre, a governor of the French Antilles and then New France.

== Voltaire's versions ==
Voltaire's two accounts of the story were polemic and not history, and contradict each other. The first, Relation de la mort du chevalier de la Barre, par M. Cassen, avocat au conseil du roi, à M. le marquis de Beccaria (1766), blames Belleval, a neighbor of la Barre's "aunt" (this account was almost immediately criticized by a local Abbeville printer for numerous inaccuracies). Le Cri du sang innocent (1775) omits all mention of Belleval and shifts the blame to Duval de Soicourt, the judge in the case (this version largely follows Simon-Nicholas Henri Linguet's memoir Pour les sieurs Moisnel, Dumesniel de Saveuse et Douville de Maillefeu injustement impliqués dans l'affaire de la mutilation d'un crucifix, arrivée à Abbeville le 9 Août 1765 (Paris, 1766).). Voltaire notably emphasizes the role of the Church, although the prosecution was entirely secular (albeit based on Old Regime law, which assumed Catholicism as the state religion and so defined a number of offenses based on religion, such as sacrilege and blasphemy). The only specific efforts by the Church hierarchy were in favor of commuting the planned execution into life imprisonment, as requested by the Bishop of Amiens.

== Events ==
On 9 August 1765, the wooden crucifix on a bridge in Abbeville was vandalized. Catholicism was then the state religion of France and the religion of the vast majority of the French public, especially in the devout town of Abbeville, where this act caused widespread shock and anger. Voltaire says that Louis-François-Gabriel d'Orléans de La Motte, the bishop of Amiens, roused the furor of the faithful and asked churchgoers to reveal all they could about the case to the civilian judges, under pain of excommunication; however, Chassaigne says that he came (at the town fathers' request) to calm emotions but that the ceremony had the opposite effect. The church was obliged under secular law to make the proclamations looking for witnesses (Voltaire mentions these proclamations, without clarifying that fact). Nobody actually revealed anything about the vandalism itself, but Du Maisniel de Belleval, a local judge who had quarreled with young la Barre, gathered damaging evidence against a group of friends (possibly not realizing his own son was part of the group).

Among other things, it came out that three young men, Gaillard d'Etallonde, Jean-François de la Barre, and Moisnel had not removed their hats when a Corpus Christi procession went by. This incident is often cited as the main basis for the charges. But numerous other blasphemies were alleged as well, including defecation on another crucifix, singing impious songs and spitting on religious images.

Soon, Douville de Maillefeu (son of a former mayor) and Belleval's own son Saveuse were also implicated. But these two along with d'Etallonde – also the son of a former mayor – managed to flee, and ultimately only d'Etallonde was named (in absentia) along with la Barre in the sentence. (Though no culprit was identified in the specific attack, Moisnel testified that he had seen d'Etallonde strike the statue with his cane on previous occasions. D'Etallonde appears in much of the testimony as the leader and instigator of the group of friends.) The only two who ended up in custody – Moisnel and la Barre – were both orphans and from outside Abbeville.

During the inquiry, la Barre's bedroom was searched and among his mainly pornographic prohibited books, Voltaire's Philosophical Dictionary was found - providing a pretext to blame the Philosophes for the young men's misbehavior.

On 20 February 1766, Duval de Soicourt and two other local judges handed down the sentence:

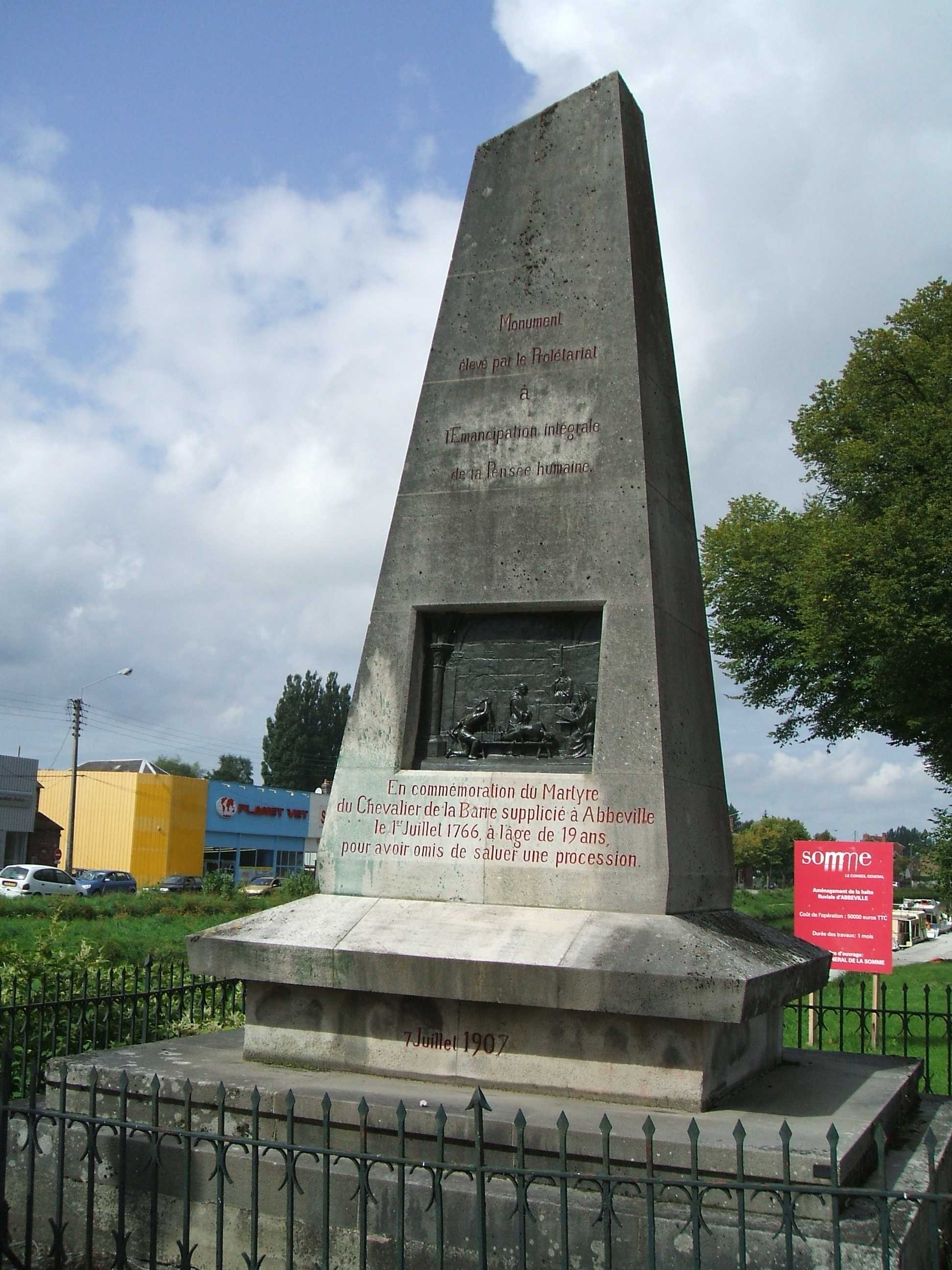
La Barre Monument at Abbeville

Regarding Jean-Francois Lefebvre, chevalier de La Barre, we declare him convicted of having taught to sing and sung impious, execrable and blasphemous songs against God; of having profaned the sign of the cross in making blessings accompanied by foul words which modesty does not permit repeating; of having knowingly refused the signs of respect to the Holy Sacrament carried in procession by the priory of Saint-Pierre; of having shown these signs of adoration to foul and abominable books that he had in his room; of having profaned the mystery of the consecration of wine, having mocked it, in pronouncing the impure terms mentioned in the trial record over a glass of wine which he held in his hand and then drunken the wine; of having finally proposed to Petignat, who was serving mass with him, to bless the cruets while pronouncing the impure words mentioned in the trial record.

In reparation of which, we condemn him to make honorable amend, in smock, head bare and a rope around his neck, holding in his hands a burning candle of two pounds before the principal door of the royal church… of Saint-Wulfram, where he will be taken in a tumbrel by the executioner who will attach before and behind him a sign on which will be written, in large letters impious one; and there, being on his knees, will confess his crimes…; this done, will have the tongue cut out and will then be taken in the said tumbrel to the public marketplace of this city to have his head cut off on a scaffold; his body and his head will then be thrown on a pyre to be destroyed, burnt, reduced to ashes and these thrown to the wind. We order that before the execution of the said Lefebvre de La Barre the ordinary and the extraordinary question [that is, torture] will be applied to have from his mouth the truth of several facts of the trial and revelation about his accomplices… We order that the Philosophical Dictionary… be thrown by the executioner on the same pyre as the body of the said Lefebvre de La Barre.

Note that this sentence does not mention the mutilation of a cross which had provoked the original inquiry.

Despite Voltaire's later claim that the court had applied an old obscure sentence for witchcraft, this sentence conformed to the statutory penalty for blasphemy and sacrilege. It is less certain however that this penalty was usually applied in practice, and Linguet later highlighted a number of defects in the legal forms of the case.

On 4 June, the Paris Parlement (more a judicial than a legislative body) confirmed the sentence on appeal. It is sometimes claimed that it added the relatively standard stipulation that la Barre be tortured just before being executed. Typically this was done to oblige the accused to reveal any accomplices. However, the Abbeville sentence already included this stipulation and the note that the Dictionary should be burned as well. The key significance of the Parlement's confirmation was to give judicial legitimacy to a sentence that Voltaire and Linguet, among others, would later portray as the result of petty local quarrels. Chassaigne notes however that the Parlement itself might have had its own political reasons for its decision.

On 1 July, la Barre was tortured early in the morning. Though he appears to have been with others when he committed some of the lesser acts named in the sentence, he refused to name any even under torture. Later the same day, he was beheaded; his body was burned with his ashes thrown in the Somme River. Voltaire's work was burned along with la Barre's body.

== Later views of the case ==
=== Linguet ===
Voltaire, at first horrified by the attention the affair drew to him, ended up defending la Barre's memory and helping d'Etallonde, whom he even received as a houseguest at Ferney. His first paper probably played a large part in the charges against the younger Belleval and Douville being dropped. His second was an attempt (unsuccessful) to obtain a pardon for d'Etallonde.

In 1778, Linguet, la Barre's own defender, criticized him harshly, though largely as a way of attacking the influence of the Philosophes with whom Linguet was quarreling by then:

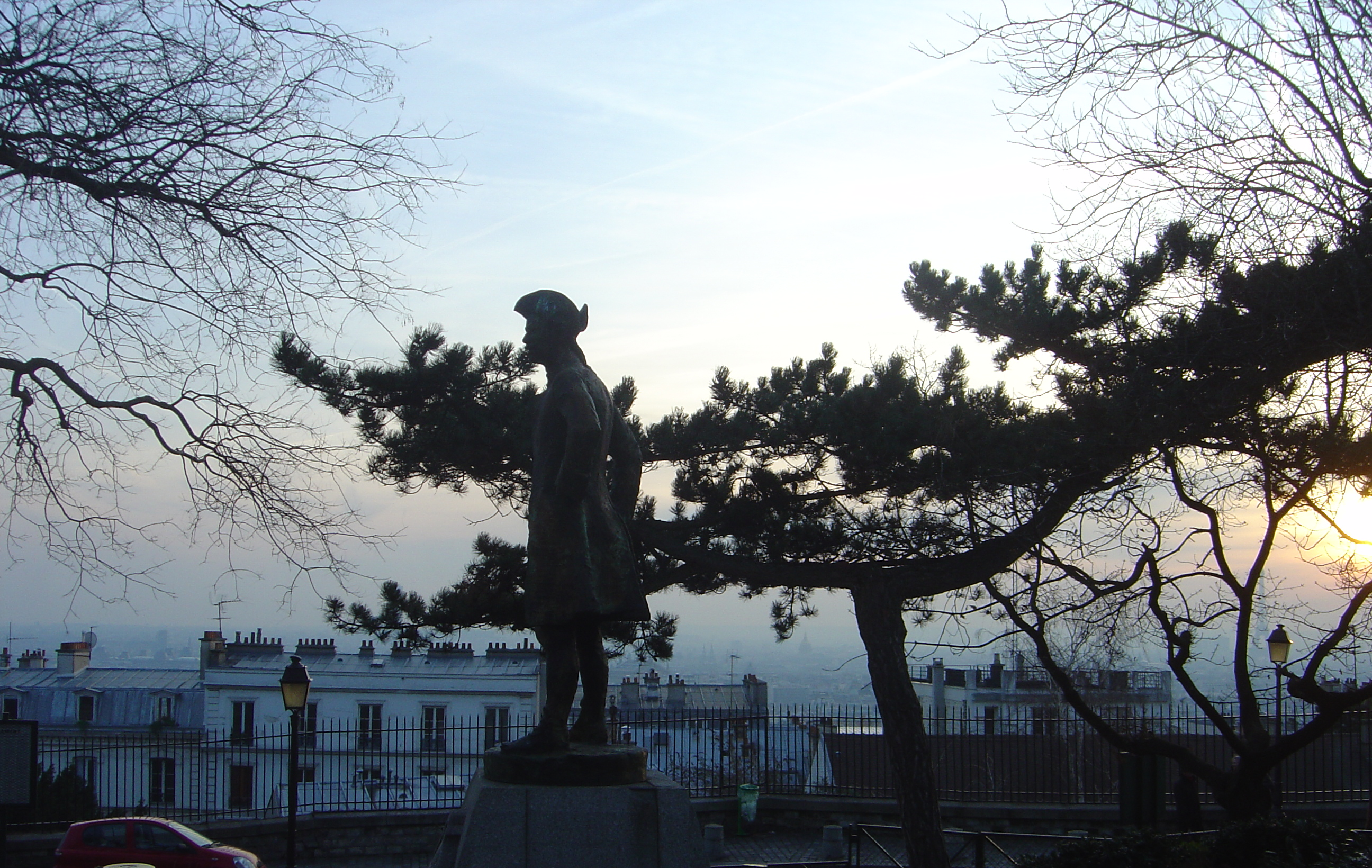
Second statue of the Chevalier de la Barre, on Montmartre

…this dirty wretch of Chevalier de la Barre. They have tried to pass him off as a budding great man, sacrificed by a religious barbarism, as a martyr of Philosophy; he was only so by very profane perversity, armed with his own indiscretion.

No one knows this deplorable affair better than me. I still have all the pieces, and all the procedure…

He was not guilty of the mutilation of the Abbeville Christ: he was not even punished for that. His condemnation… was the result of a quarrel between two men of law, of some particular resentments which directed the first judges, and of the skill with which, to influence the second, was emphasized the general alarm inspired in partisans of Religion by the redoubled attacks which he saw carried against it, by the sort of plot formed to destroy it; but one cannot say that he was entirely innocent, and I so warned M. de Voltaire himself by a special letter.

The habitual use of these fruits of philosophical madness had turned his head: he had drawn from them the passion for irreligion: he daily engaged in the type of excess that it is easy to pass off as crimes.

He goes on to say that la Barre's youth might have earned him some consideration had it not been for the need to make an example, and explicitly blames the Philosophes for having set la Barre's mind on fire. (Note that the trial record itself says little or nothing about such influence; the idea that the actions of la Barre and his friends were inspired by larger ideas, rather than adolescent discontent, is based almost wholly on the presence of a few books in his library.)

The sentence was reversed by the National Convention during the French Revolution in 1794.

In 1895, Jean Cruppi wrote an overview of Linguet's role in the case (which also includes a detailed and documented look at the case itself, including quotes from la Barre's interrogation under torture). He ends with this observation:

When one revisits this drama, a feeling of indignation against such cruel magistrates suddenly takes hold of the spirit; then, another impression comes forth. Why condemn judges, most of whom were of good faith, and judged the case through each day, and following the statute? Above Picard quarrels, even above the justice of Parlement, the responsibility for such errors must be attributed to the general current, to the false collective appreciation of a time. And, to resume our thought in a word, we fear that if the criminal jury had existed in 1766, the Abbeville defendants would not have been treated with more justice. In effect, whoever the judges, how can one ask of them enough firmness and clarity of vision to be ahead of their time and to isolate themselves from their milieu? Nine times out of ten, their sentence reflects this milieu. After the decision, sometimes even because of the decision, of its precisions and its consequences, light dawns, public opinion changes, and blames magistrates for resolutions it has itself dictated.

=== Charles Dickens' A Tale of Two Cities ===
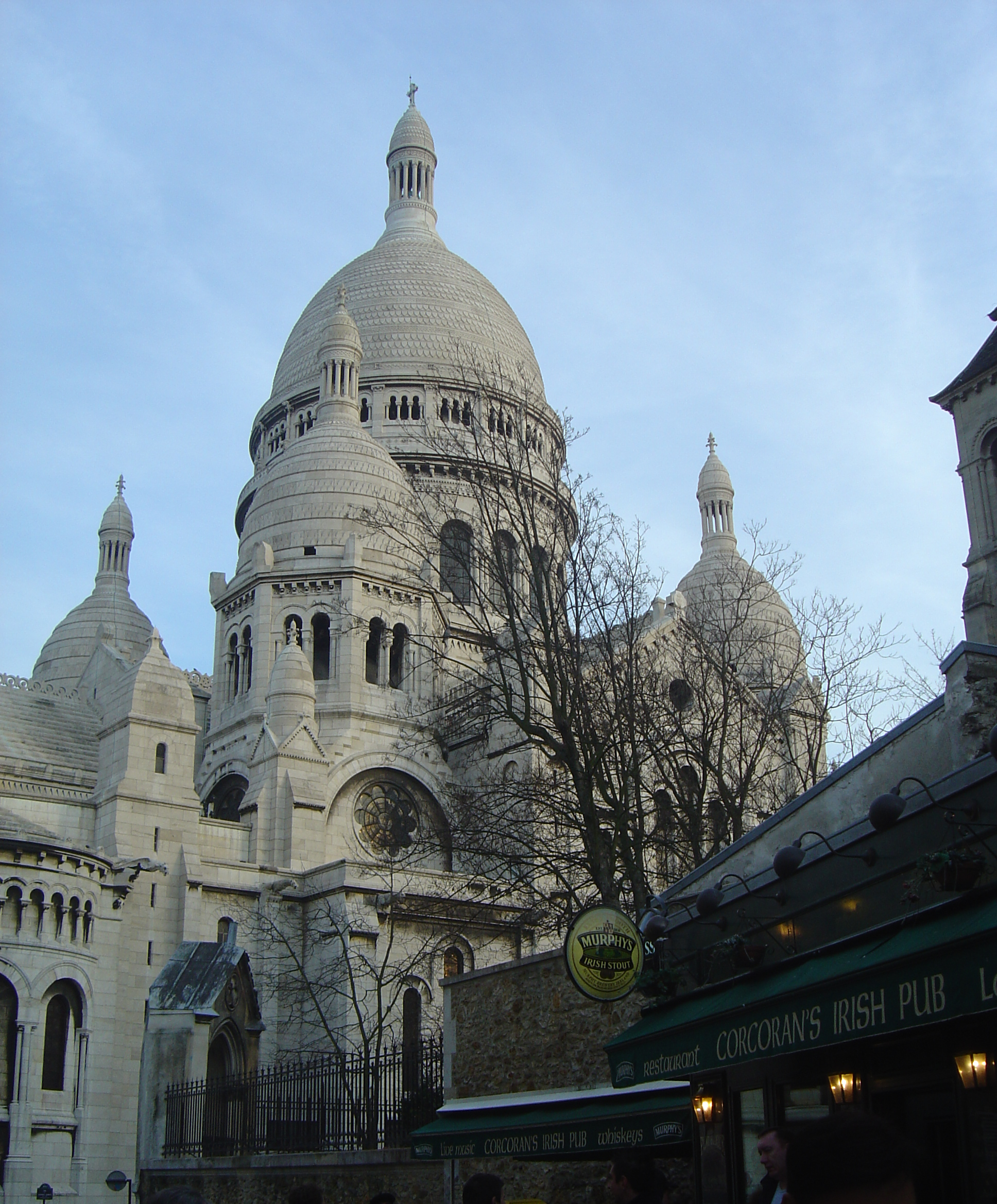
Rue du Chevalier de La Barre, next to the Sacré-Cœur Basilica of Paris on the butte Montmartre

A later reference to the torture and execution of la Barre can be found in the first pages of Charles Dickens' A Tale of Two Cities (1859):

France, less favoured on the whole as to matters spiritual than her sister of the shield and trident, rolled with exceeding smoothness down hill, making paper money and spending it. Under the guidance of her Christian pastors, she entertained herself, besides, with such humane achievements as sentencing a youth to have his hands cut off, his tongue torn out with pincers, and his body burned alive, because he had not kneeled down in the rain to do honour to a dirty procession of monks which passed within his view, at a distance of some fifty or sixty yards. — Book the First—Recalled to Life. I. The Period.

=== Other works ===
Marc Chassaigne's Le procès du Chevalier de la Barre (Paris, 1920) and Max Gallo's Que passe la justice du Roi (Paris, 1987); both books (in French) are extensive studies of this affair.

== Posthumous tributes ==
=== Paris – Montemartre ===
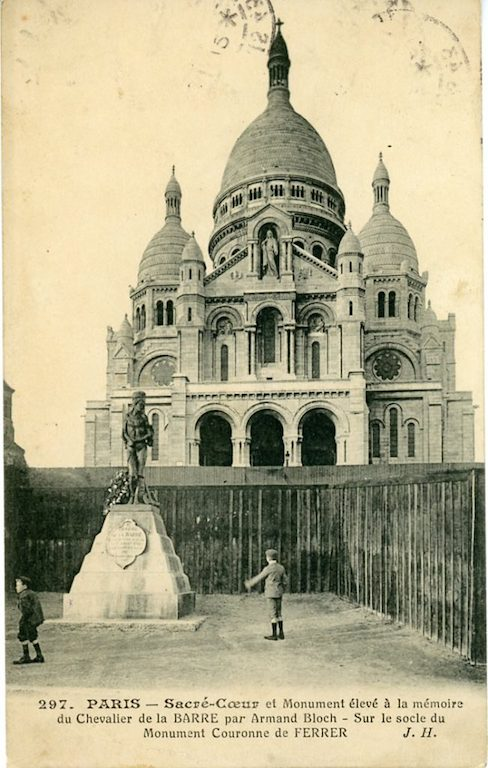
Monument to the Chevalier de la Barre – Paris, 18th arr. at Sacré-Cœur de Montmartre, circa 1906

The Freemasons of the Grand Orient of France and other organized freethinkers obtained the elevation of the first Chevalier de la Barre statue in Paris as "the antidote in front of poison" to the Basilica of the Sacred Heart of Jesus of Paris (Sacré-Cœur) on Montmartre during 1897. The Municipal Council of Paris during 1904 recovered 5000 m^{2} of land wrongfully retained by the archdiocese and decided to award a 5,000-franc grant toward the completion of the statue at this location in line with the great portal of the Sacré-Cœur, Paris.

A full-size mock-up of the statue and base, as sculpted by freethinker Armand Bloch, was inaugurated on 3 September 1905 at the Congress of Freethinkers. The following year, 1906, the statue was cast in bronze and was placed 'provisionally' by the Paris City Council at the gate of the Sacré-Cœur basilica during a ceremony which was attended by approximately 25,000 spectators.

In 1926 the statue of the Chevalier de la Barre on Montmartre was moved away from the approach of the basilica entrance to the nearby and lower elevation of Square Nadar. This original Chevalier de la Barre statue by Bloch was eventually toppled on 11 October 1941 and melted down with other non-religious statues by the Vichy France regime under Marshal and Chief of State of Vichy France Philippe Pétain.

The Paris City Council decided on 24 February 2001 to erect a new statue of the Chevalier de la Barre at the Square Nadar. It is the work of sculptor Emmanuel Ball.

Rue du Chevalier de La Barre is a Paris street that is located behind the Sacré-Cœur, between the Rue Ramey and the Rue du Mont-Cenis and also is the postal street address of the Sacré-Cœur basilica.

=== Abbeville ===
The Freemasons of the Grand Orient of France placed a bouquet of flowers during a 1902 memorial at the Abbeville location of la Barre execution site, forming the creation of the group la Barre that was organized as a ceremonial event running through the city center of Abbeville.

A la Barre monument was first erected on the banks of the Canal de la Somme at the la Barre execution site in Abbeville in 1907 with funds collected by voluntary subscription and the obelisk with its bronze plaque depicting the la Barre torture and execution remains standing today.

The bronze plaque depicting the torture of the Chevalier Lefebvre de la Barre was temporarily removed from the la Barre monument during the World War II military occupation of France and hidden in a creek for safekeeping from the Vichy France regime. Under this plate reads "In Commemoration of the Martyrdom of the Chevalier de La Barre tortured in Abbeville on 1 July 1766 at the age of 19 years for failing to salute a procession." At the base is inscribed the date of the inauguration: "7 July 1907."

Today, the la Barre name and both the Abbeville monument and Parisian statue of la Barre have become iconic representations of the victims of religious intolerance in France and are regarded as rallying points for freethinkers. Three associations exist with the name of the Chevalier de la Barre in Paris, Abbeville, and the Masonic Lodge of the Grand Orient of France in Bergerac.

The Abbeville monument to the Chevalier de la Barre was vandalized on 22 June 2013 by supporters of the Civitas movement.

=== Street names ===
There are French streets or impasses named in memory of Chevalier de la Barre in the following common places:

- Abbeville (Somme),
- Albert (Somme),
- Amiens (Somme),
- Apt (Vaucluse),
- Les Arcs (Var),
- Audierne (Finistère),
- Bègles (Gironde),
- Bellegarde-sur-Valserine (Ain),
- Le Bourget (Seine-Saint-Denis),
- Bray-sur-Somme (Somme),
- Bruay-sur-l'Escaut (Nord),
- Camon (Somme),
- Cayeux-sur-Mer (Somme),
- Courcelles-lès-Lens (Pas-de-Calais),
- La Courneuve (Seine-Saint-Denis),
- Le Creusot (Saône et Loire),
- Drancy (Seine-Saint-Denis),
- Dunkerque (Nord),
- Eu (Seine-Maritime),
- Feuquières-en-Vimeu (Somme),
- Fouquières-lès-Lens, (Pas-de-Calais),
- Fresnes-sur-Escaut (Nord),
- Fressenneville (Somme),
- Friville-Escarbotin (Somme),
- Gamaches, (Somme),
- Graulhet (Tarn),
- Le Havre, (Seine-Maritime),
- Houplines (Nord),
- Issy-les-Moulineaux (Hauts-de-Seine),
- Liévin (Pas-de-Calais),
- Lille (Nord),
- Livry-Gargan (Seine-Saint-Denis),
- Longueau (Somme),
- Loos-lez-Lille (Nord),
- Lunel (Hérault),
- Marseille (5e),
- Migennes (Yonne),
- Mouscron (Belgique),
- Paris (18e; street address of the Sacré-Cœur),
- Les Pavillons-sous-Bois (Seine Saint-Denis),
- Pompierre (Vosges),
- Puteaux, (Hauts de Seine),
- Rantigny (Oise),
- Romans-sur-Isère (Drome),
- Romanswiller (Bas-Rhin),
- Rosny-sous-Bois (Seine-Saint-Denis),
- Saint-Pol-sur-Mer (Nord),
- Sainghin-en-Weppes (Nord),
- Saint-Aignan (Loir et Cher),
- Saint-Denis (Seine-Saint-Denis),
- Saint-Quentin (Aisne),
- Saint-Saulve (Nord),
- Sevran (Seine-Saint-Denis),
- La Seyne-sur-Mer (Var),
- Somain (Nord),
- Suresnes (Hauts de Seine),
- Templemars (Nord),
- Thouars (Deux-Sèvres),
- Tours (Indre-et-Loire),
- Vanves (Hauts de Seine),
- La Varenne-Saint-Hilaire, (Val de Marne),
- Villepinte (Seine-Saint-Denis),
- Wattignies (Nord),
- Woincourt (Somme),
- Yerres (Essonne).
