= La Barre Monument =

Monument in Abbeville, France

- Monument La Barre
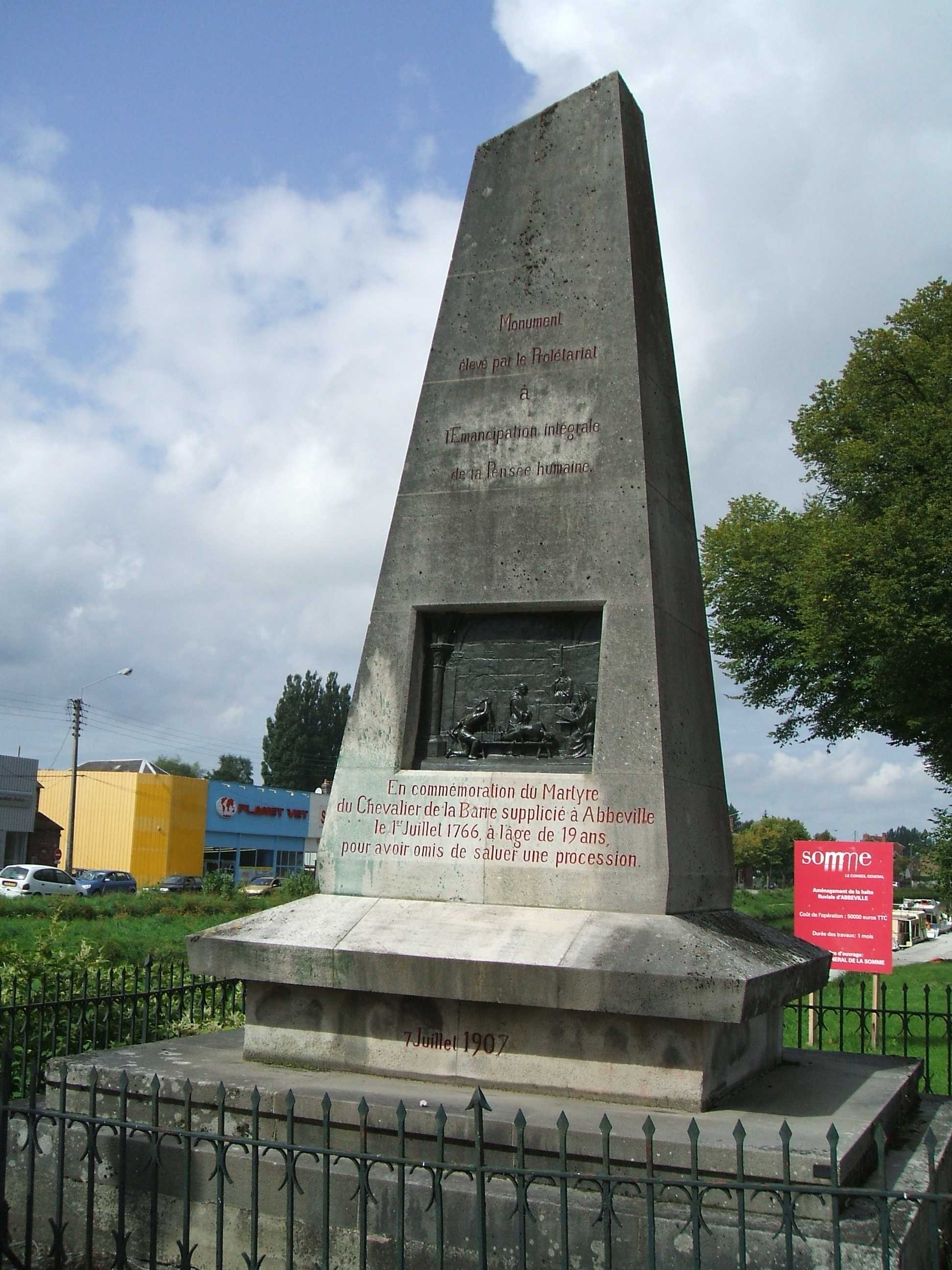
- La Barre Monument at Abbeville
- Interactive map of La Barre Monument
- Location: Abbeville, Somme, France
- Coordinates: 50.1058°N 1.8358°E
- Type: Cenotaph
- Completion date: 1907
- Dedicated to: Ordeal of the Chevalier de La Barre

The La Barre Monument (French: Monument La Barre) is a secular monument in Abbeville, (Somme), France. It lies near the railway station (Gare d'Abbeville), next to the canal aqueduct over the River Somme.

It was erected in 1907, by public subscription, in commemoration of the ordeal of François-Jean de la Barre, known as the Chevalier (en|Knight) de La Barre. In 1766, at Abbeville, La Barre was tried, found guilty, and executed for failing to salute a religious procession. The monument is today an annual gathering point for defenders of secularism and freethinking.

== Chevalier de La Barre ==
=== Ordeal ===
On 1 July 1766, at Abbeville, a young man of 18 years of age, François-Jean Lefebvre de La Barre was beheaded for having failed to show religious respect. In applying the law, the judge committed him to have his bones crushed until he confessed his crime and denounced his accomplices, his tongue torn out, his right hand and head cut off, and their ashes thrown to the wind.

The three principals in the case said that they had expected the judgment, having "been tried and convicted of letting pass twenty-five steps of a procession without doffing the hat on his head, not genuflecting, singing an unholy song, and making reference to infamous books, among which can be found Mr. Voltaire's Dictionnaire Philosophique".

=== Symbolism ===
After the French Revolution, the French National Convention of 15 November 1793 (in the French Republican Calendar, 25 Brumaire an II) pardoned La Barre posthumously as a "Victim of the Superstition".

At the turn of the 19th to 20th centuries, with embattled public schools and the secularisation of institutions, which culminated in the 1905 French law on the Separation of the Churches and the State, La Barre became a symbol of the anticlerical battle.

In 1904, the Paris City Council recovered 1/2 hectare (1.2 acres) that had been unlawfully obtained by the Archbishopric, and moved to build a statue of de La Barre there, in line with the Grand Portal of the Sacré-Coeur de Montmartre. This statue by Armand Bloch was inaugurated on 3 September 1905, witnessed by 25,000 people. It was removed in 1941 by the Vichy Government. It would take more than sixty years before a replacement was erected, not far from the original, in the Nadar Square.

== Beginnings ==
In 1902, two teachers and two students of the lycée in Abbeville founded the Groupe La Barre and moved to revive the memory of La Barre. On 14 July, Bastille Day, they laid a bouquet at his place of execution. The local authority (French: municipalité) removed it immediately.

This initiative was continued in the following years, culminating on 7 July 1907 when the La Barre Monument was unveiled. 15,000 supporters travelled to Abbeville by the trainload. The monument was funded by a lottery of 100,000 tickets at 25 centimes each.

The monument has the form of a tapered column, on which is written the inscription Monument élevé par le Prolétariat à l'Émancipation intégrale de la Pensée humaine ("Monument erected by the People to the Full Emancipation of Human Thought").

A bronze plaque was inserted into it, which represents the torture inflicted on La Barre. This plaque reads En commémoration du Martyre du Chevalier de La Barre supplicié à Abbeville le 1er Juillet 1766 à l'âge de 19 ans pour avoir omis de saluer une procession ("In commemoration of the Martyr Knight La Barre tortured at Abbeville 1 July 1766 at the age of 19 years for having failed to salute a procession"). During the First World War the plaque was removed and placed on a train to be melted down, but a railway worker hid it in a stream, whencefrom it was recovered after the war.

== Ceremony ==
In July 1903, following the 1902 gesture, around fifty people laid a wreath, which was again immediately removed by the local authority.

In 1904, for the first time, the labour organisations of the Vimeu region, associated themselves with the event. A thousand people paid homage to the victim of religious intolerance. The framework of the Manifestation La Barre ("La Barre Ceremony") was established, and remains to this day.

From 1907, the ceremony's point of departure was the Monument La Barre and it finished at the place of his execution, near the town hall.

For nearly sixty years, there was a joint ceremony of freethinkers, often coming from very far away, and the Department's workers' movements and secular organisations. In 1963, around twenty organisations – political parties and trades unions – took part in the ceremony.

In 1986, the Fédération nationale de la libre pensée moved to commemorate the 220th anniversary of La Barre's execution. Thanks to this, the ceremony has once again become a model secular gathering.

== Vandalism ==
The monument has been vandalised on numerous occasions. As of February 2015, the latest act of vandalism was on 22 June that year. Two crosses and a heart mounted on a cross, a symbol of Civitas, a right-wing Roman Catholic pressure group, had been drawn on it in black paint.
