= Charles Coffin (writer) =

French teacher, writer, Jansenist and Rector of the University of Paris (1676–1749)

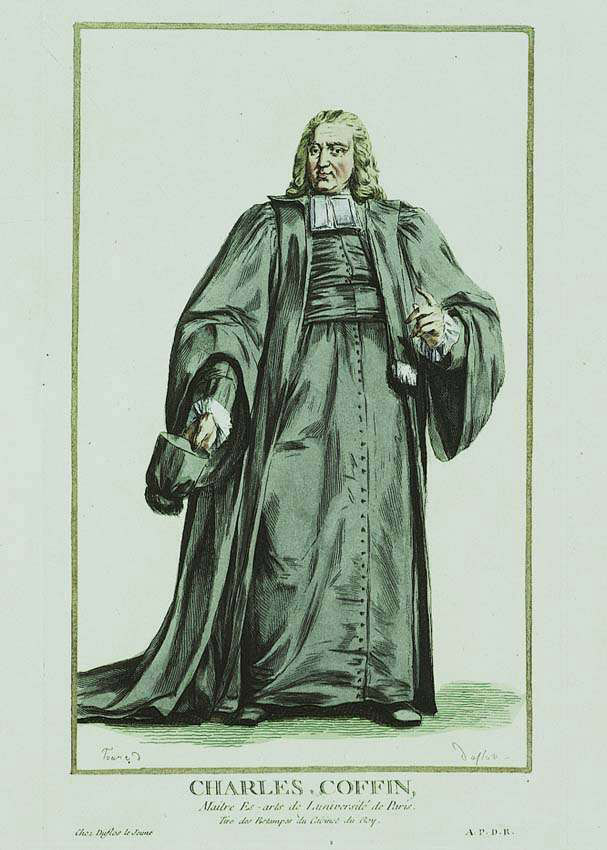
Engraved portrait by Touzé-Duflos of Charles Coffin

Charles Coffin (pron. sharl co-fenh; 4 October 1676 Buzancy, now in the department of Ardennes - 20 June 1749 Paris) was a French teacher, writer and Jansenist who was Rector of the University of Paris. Among his writings are a number of hymns which have been translated into English.

== Life ==
Charles Coffin was born 4 October 1676 at Buzancy in the Duchy of Rheim and educated at College du Plessis. In 1701, he was appointed chief assistant to Charles Rollin, principal of the Collège de Beauvais. He succeeded Rollin as principal in 1712. That same year he was entrusted with the funeral oration for Louis, Duke of Burgundy, the father of Louis XV. In 1718. he became rector of the University of Paris, a post which he held until his death.

== Hymns ==
Coffin published in 1727 some of his Latin poems, for which he was already noted, and in 1736 the bulk of his hymns appeared in the Paris Breviary of that year, an edition of which was published in 1838 at Oxford by John Henry Newman. 1736 also saw the publication of Coffin's Hymni Sacri Auctore Carolo Coffin, and in 1755 a complete edition of his Works was issued in 2 vols.

The Hymni Sacri included a poem adapted from the original chant, Jordanis oras prævia, which John Chandler later translated to the hymn On Jordan's Bank the Baptist's Cry set to the tune Winchester New for use at Matins during Advent. Chandler also translated Coffin's The Advent of Our King.

Among his other works is an ode in praise of the wines of Champagne. This work is a version of a similar poem in which Bénigne Grenan, professor at Harcourt College, praised the pre-eminence of Burgundy wine, and that one of Charles Coffin's Jansenist friends, Marc-Antoine Hersan, had had fun reciting one evening at a dinner.

== Jansenism ==
While the papal bull Unigenitus condemned Jansenism, many in France interpreted it as an attack on the prerogatives of the French church. The University of Paris and the provincial Parlements were hotbeds of opposition. The university was known to harbor Jansenist sympathizers; the Parlement of Paris went so far as to threatened to confiscate the temporalities of the Archbishop. As rector of the university and clerk to the Parlement of Paris, even Coffin's hymns were viewed by some with suspicion.

== Death ==
Coffin died of pneumonia in Paris 20 June 1749. Due to his persistence in appealing against the apostolic constitution Unigenitus, under instructions from the Archbishop, who wished to make an example, the parish rector of Saint-Étienne-du-Mont, refused to administer last rites to him, or give him a Christian burial Robert Darnton observed that, "To deny the final absolution of sins to Christians on their deathbed was, in the eyes of many, to send them straight to Purgatory, an unforgivable abuse of royal and ecclesiastical authority.” Four thousand Parisians joined the funeral procession. Because the crown had supported the suppression of the Jansenists, Danton notes that the religious rite took on political overtones. The Parlement of Paris subsequently issued an official and strong “remonstrance” to the king. Richard J. Janet sees the resulting popular demonstrations as contributing to the growing disenchantment with the monarchy that would later play into the coming Revolution.

Coffin left a legacy to the college of Beauvais, and founded awards at the University of Paris.

=== Postscript ===
In December 1750 Coffin's nephew, became seriously ill, and he asked for the last sacraments from the parish priest, but he too, was refused. However, on this occasion Parlement had more time to intervene. The Parliament summoned the parish priest and ordered him to exercise his ministry, but the latter invoked the instructions of the archbishop. His insolence is such that the Attorney General incarcerates him two days at the Conciergerie and sentenced him to three pounds of alms for the bread of the prisoners. Parlement negotiated directly with the Archbishop of Paris. A compromise was found, "worthy of such a great friend of the Jesuits." Another pastor was sent to the patient to take his confession, but without asking him anything about the "present disputes" and, in view of his confession, the parish priest of Saint-Étienne-du-Mont administered the last rites. Coffin's nephew died 10 January.

== Hymns ==
- "On Jordan's bank the Baptist's cry" (Latin: Jordanis oras praevia)
