= Phalempin =

- Commune
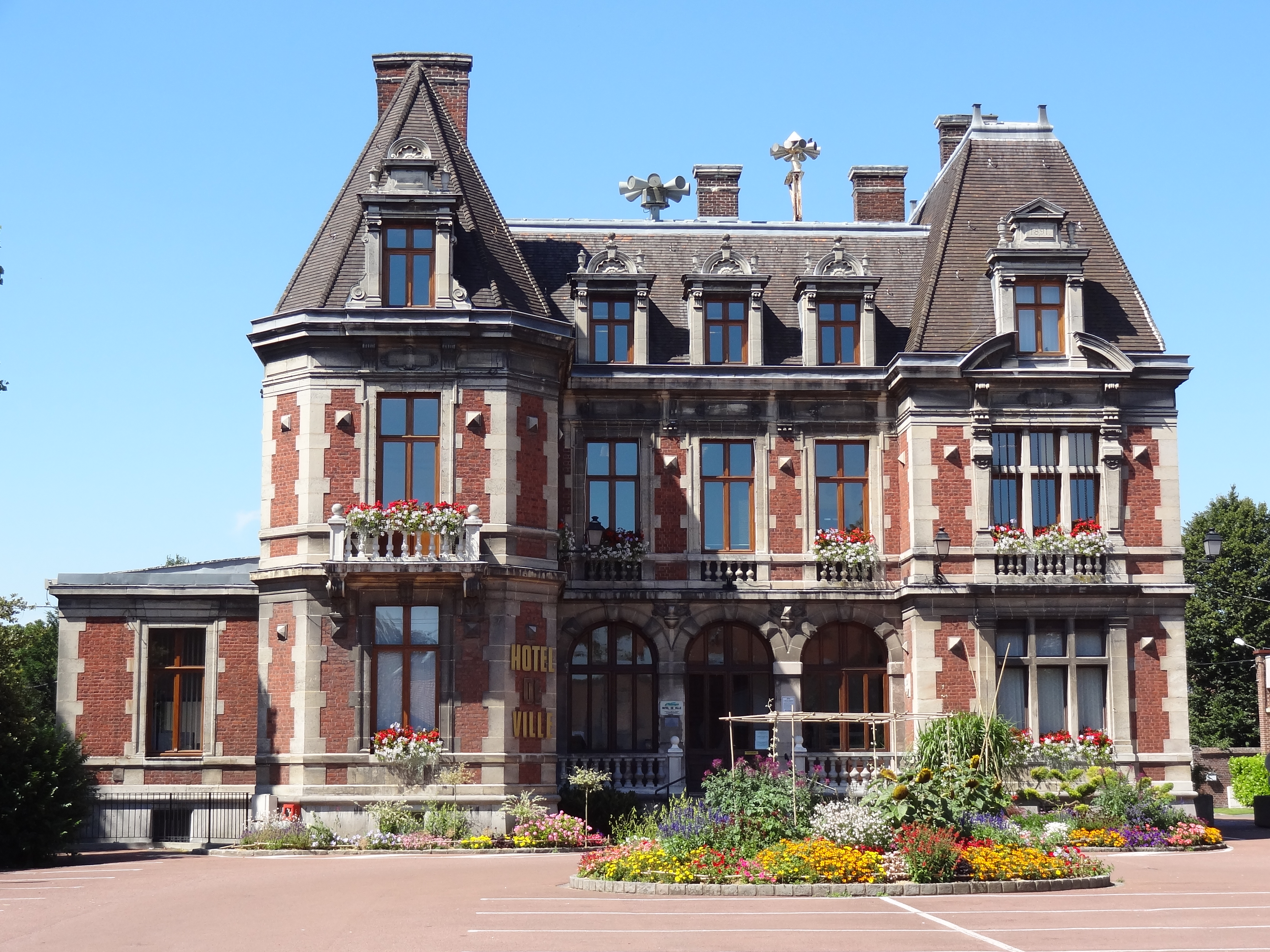
- The town hall in Phalempin

- Coat of arms
- Location of Phalempin
- Location within France Location within Hauts-de-France
- Coordinates: 50°31′03″N 3°01′02″E
- Country: France
- Region: Hauts-de-France
- Department: Nord
- Arrondissement: Lille
- Canton: Annœullin
- Intercommunality: Pévèle-Carembault

Government
  - Mayor (2020–2026): Thierry Lazaro
- Area^{1}: 7.93 km^{2} (3.06 sq mi)
- Elevation: 60 m (200 ft)
- Highest elevation: 65 m (213 ft)
- Lowest elevation: 24 m (79 ft)
- Population (2023): 4,847
  - Density: 611/km^{2} (1,580/sq mi)
- Time zone: UTC+01:00 (CET)
  - Summer (DST): UTC+02:00 (CEST)
- INSEE/Postal code: 59462 /59133
- ^{1} French Land Register data, which excludes lakes, ponds, glaciers > 1 km^{2} (0.386 sq mi or 247 acres) and river estuaries.

Phalempin (French pronunciation: [falɑ̃pɛ̃]) is a commune in the Nord department in northern France.

== Population ==
Historical population
Year	Pop.	±% p.a.
1968	3,457	—
1975	4,070	+2.36%
1982	4,377	+1.04%
1990	4,678	+0.83%
1999	4,615	−0.15%
2007	4,443	−0.47%
2012	4,424	−0.09%
2017	4,729	+1.34%
2023	4,847	+0.41%
Source: INSEE

== Heraldry ==
Arms of Phalempin	The arms of Phalempin are blazoned : Gules, a chief Or. (La Neuville, Fresnes-sur-Escaut, Ostricourt, Phalempin and Sainghin-en-Weppes use the same arms.)

== See also ==
- Communes of the Nord department
