= La Neuville, Nord =

La Neuville
- Commune
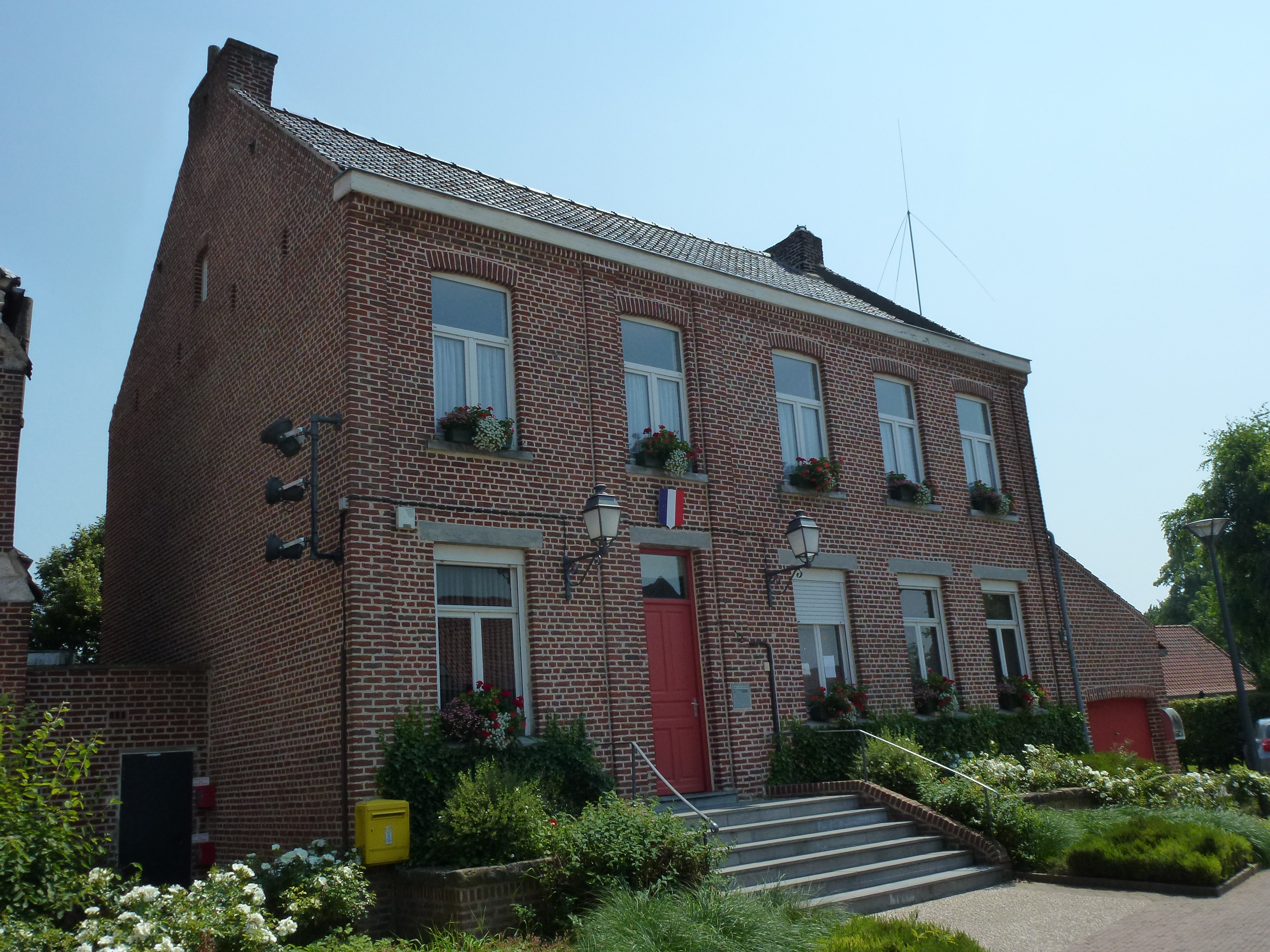
- The town hall in La Neuville

- Coat of arms
- Location of La Neuville
- Location within France Location within Hauts-de-France
- Coordinates: 50°29′41″N 3°02′52″E
- Country: France
- Region: Hauts-de-France
- Department: Nord
- Arrondissement: Lille
- Canton: Templeuve-en-Pévèle
- Intercommunality: Pévèle-Carembault

Government
  - Mayor (2020–2026): Thierry Depoortere
- Area^{1}: 3.95 km^{2} (1.53 sq mi)
- Elevation: 37 m (121 ft)
- Highest elevation: 66 m (217 ft)
- Lowest elevation: 40 m (130 ft)
- Population (2023): 593
  - Density: 150/km^{2} (389/sq mi)
- Time zone: UTC+01:00 (CET)
  - Summer (DST): UTC+02:00 (CEST)
- INSEE/Postal code: 59427 /59239
- ^{1} French Land Register data, which excludes lakes, ponds, glaciers > 1 km^{2} (0.386 sq mi or 247 acres) and river estuaries.

La Neuville (French pronunciation: [la nøvil]) is a commune in the Nord department in northern France.

== Heraldry ==
Arms of La Neuville	The arms of La Neuville are blazoned : Gules, a chief Or. (La Neuville, Fresnes-sur-Escaut, Ostricourt, Phalempin and Sainghin-en-Weppes use the same arms.)

== See also ==
- Communes of the Nord department
