= Ostricourt =

- Commune
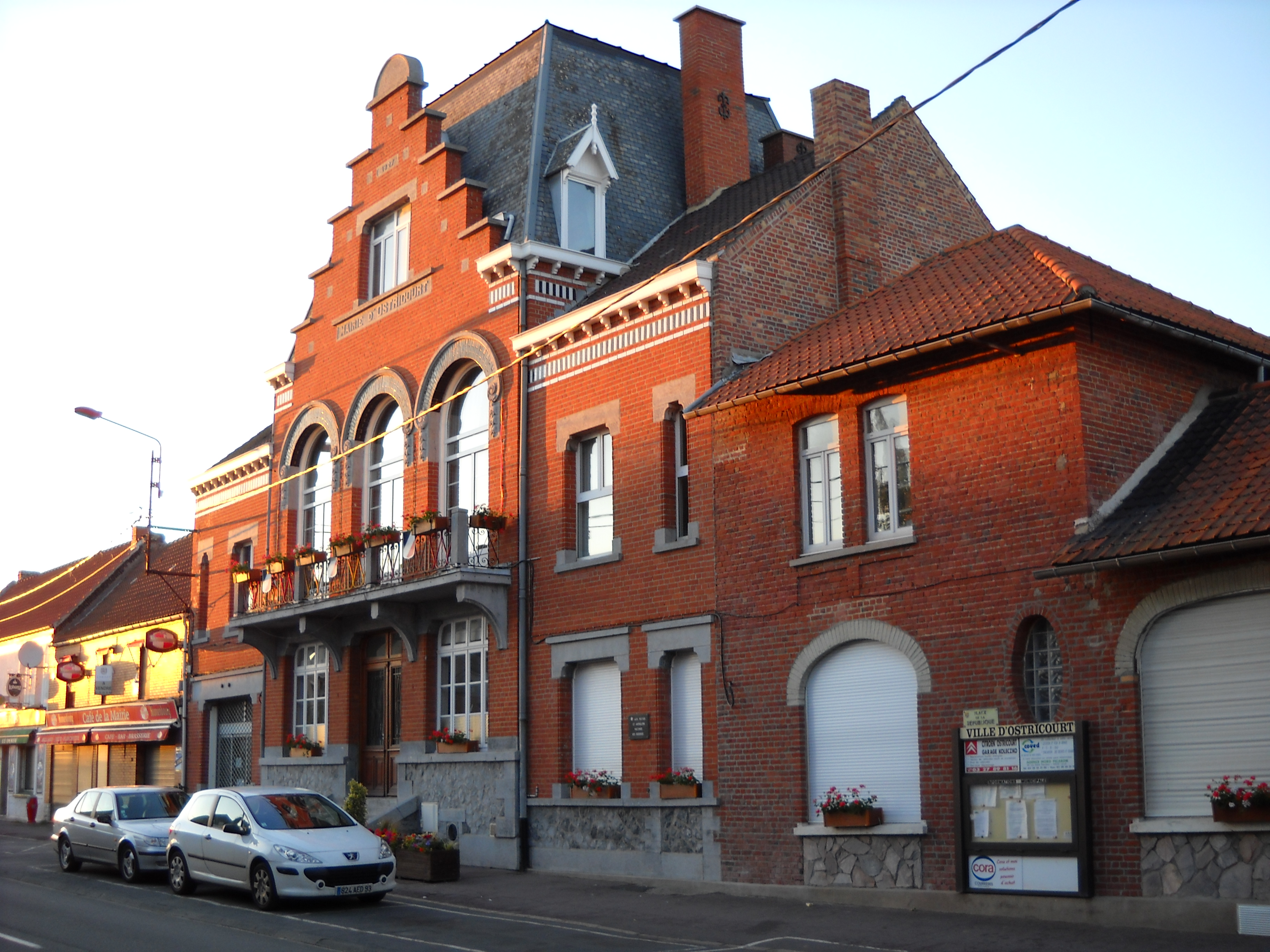
- The town hall in Ostricourt

- Coat of arms
- Location of Ostricourt
- Location within France Location within Hauts-de-France
- Coordinates: 50°27′19″N 3°01′55″E
- Country: France
- Region: Hauts-de-France
- Department: Nord
- Arrondissement: Lille
- Canton: Annœullin
- Intercommunality: Pévèle-Carembault

Government
  - Mayor (2020–2026): Bruno Rusinek
- Area^{1}: 7.6 km^{2} (2.9 sq mi)
- Elevation: 27 m (89 ft)
- Highest elevation: 100 m (330 ft)
- Lowest elevation: 25 m (82 ft)
- Population (2023): 6,097
  - Density: 800/km^{2} (2,100/sq mi)
- Time zone: UTC+01:00 (CET)
  - Summer (DST): UTC+02:00 (CEST)
- INSEE/Postal code: 59452 /59162
- ^{1} French Land Register data, which excludes lakes, ponds, glaciers > 1 km^{2} (0.386 sq mi or 247 acres) and river estuaries.

Ostricourt (French pronunciation: [ɔstʁikuʁ]) is a commune in the Nord department in northern France.

== Population ==
Historical population
Year	Pop.	±% p.a.
1968	7,388	—
1975	6,821	−1.13%
1982	6,165	−1.43%
1990	6,064	−0.21%
1999	5,412	−1.26%
2007	5,114	−0.71%
2012	5,378	+1.01%
2017	5,372	−0.02%
2023	6,097	+2.13%
Source: INSEE

== Heraldry ==
Arms of Ostricourt	The arms of Ostricourt are blazoned : Gules, a chief Or. (La Neuville, Fresnes-sur-Escaut, Ostricourt, Phalempin and Sainghin-en-Weppes use the same arms.)

== See also ==
- Communes of the Nord department
