= Collège de Beauvais =

School in Paris, France

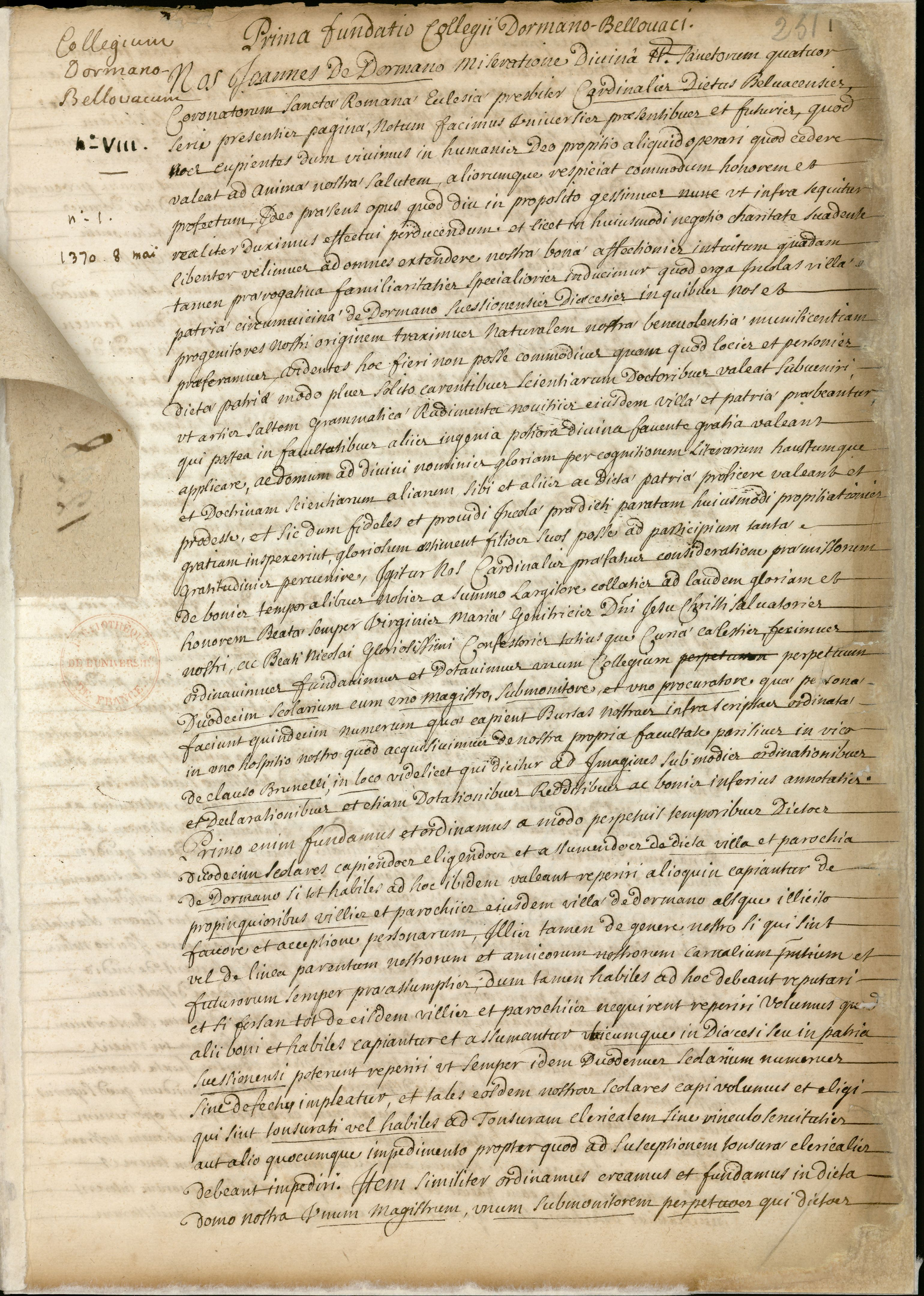
Collège de Beauvais (also known as collège de Dormans-Beauvais): foundation and statutes. Latin manuscript, 17th century (Bibliothèque de la Sorbonne, NuBIS)

The College of Beauvais (also known the College of Dormans-Beauvais) was in Paris in what is now the Rue Jean de Beauvais. At the end of the 17th century and at the beginning of the 18th century, it was one of the leading schools of France, educating pupils whose parents were prominent in the French establishment.

== History ==
The college was founded in 1370 by Jean de Dormans, Bishop of Beauvais and Chancellor of France. The Midsummer's Day Hall which remains standing today, was built in 1375 by Raymond du Temple, architect of Charles V of France. Later in 1381 he designed further buildings of the college.

In 1699, historian Charles Rollin was appointed principal of the Collège de Beauvais. He was succeeded in 1712 by Charles Coffin.

Alumni of the College of Beauvais include Jean Racine, Nicolas Boileau, Jean-Jacques Rousseau, Simone Nicolas Henri Linguet, Charles Perrault, Cyrano de Bergerac and Claude Nicolas Ledoux etc.
