= Sainghin-en-Weppes =

- Commune
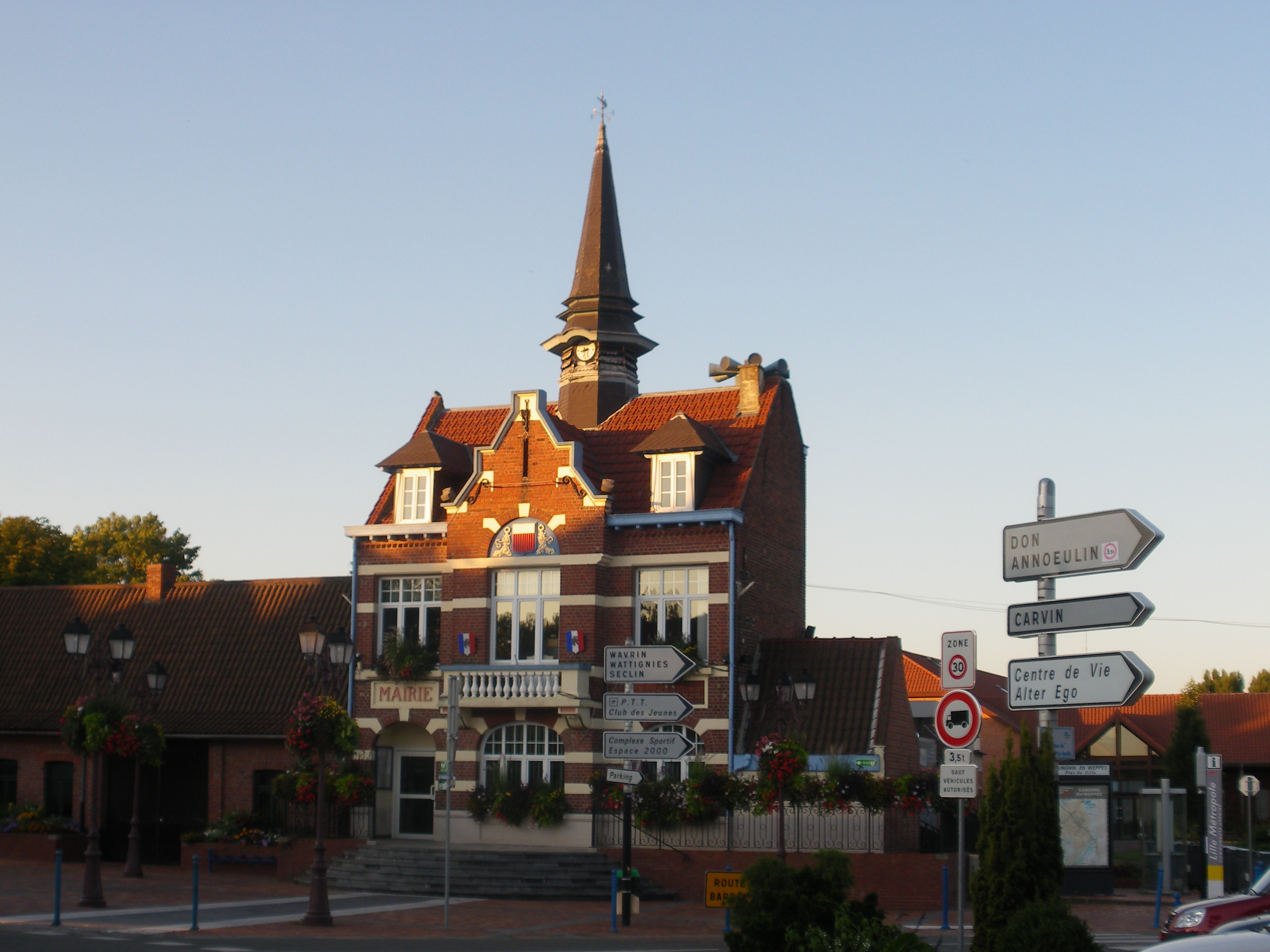
- The town hall in Sainghin-en-Weppes

- Coat of arms
- Location of Sainghin-en-Weppes
- Location within France Location within Hauts-de-France
- Coordinates: 50°33′47″N 2°54′05″E
- Country: France
- Region: Hauts-de-France
- Department: Nord
- Arrondissement: Lille
- Canton: Annœullin
- Intercommunality: Métropole Européenne de Lille

Government
  - Mayor (2020–2026): Matthieu Corbillon
- Area^{1}: 7.71 km^{2} (2.98 sq mi)
- Elevation: 29 m (95 ft)
- Highest elevation: 41 m (135 ft)
- Lowest elevation: 18 m (59 ft)
- Population (2023): 5,638
  - Density: 731/km^{2} (1,890/sq mi)
- Time zone: UTC+01:00 (CET)
  - Summer (DST): UTC+02:00 (CEST)
- INSEE/Postal code: 59524 /59184
- ^{1} French Land Register data, which excludes lakes, ponds, glaciers > 1 km^{2} (0.386 sq mi or 247 acres) and river estuaries.

Sainghin-en-Weppes (French pronunciation: [sɛ̃ɡɛ̃ ɑ̃ wɛp]) is a commune in the Nord department in northern France. The commune is part of the Métropole Européenne de Lille.

== Population ==
Historical population
Year	Pop.	±% p.a.
1968	4,235	—
1975	5,270	+3.17%
1982	5,010	−0.72%
1990	5,119	+0.27%
1999	5,137	+0.04%
2007	5,524	+0.91%
2012	5,554	+0.11%
2017	5,586	+0.11%
2023	5,638	+0.15%
Source: INSEE

== Heraldry ==
Arms of Sainghin-en-Weppes	The arms of Sainghin-en-Weppes are blazoned : Gules, a chief Or. (La Neuville, Fresnes-sur-Escaut, Ostricourt, Phalempin and Sainghin-en-Weppes use the same arms.)

== See also ==
- Communes of the Nord department
