= Charles Rollin =

French historian and educator (1661–1741)

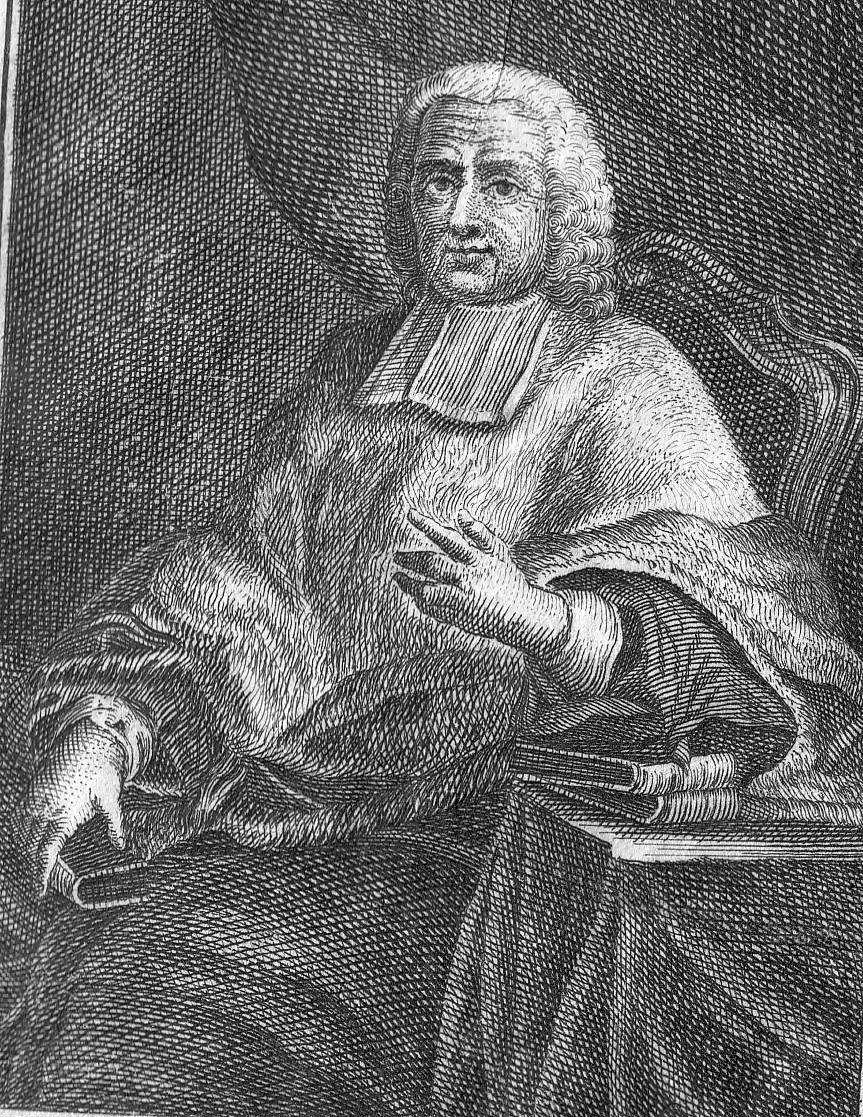
Engraving of Charles Rollin from an Italian version of his Ancient History (1730-38).

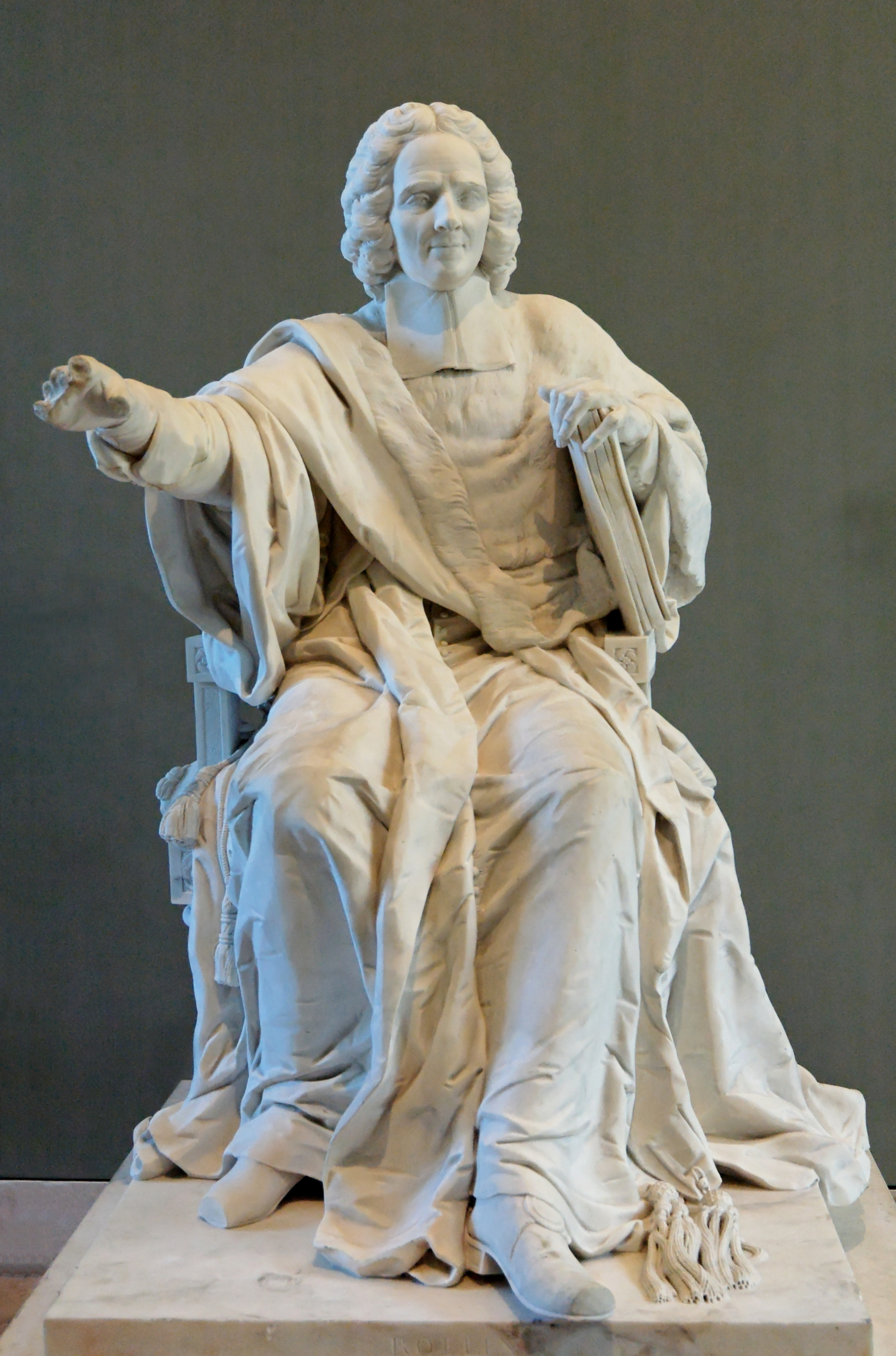
Statue of Charles Rollin on display at the Louvre.

Charles Rollin (30 January 1661 in Paris – 14 December 1741 in Paris) was a French historian and educator.

== Life ==
Rollin was the son of a cutler, and at the age of 22 was made a master in the Collège du Plessis. In 1694 he was rector of the University of Paris, rendering great service among other things by reviving the study of Greek. He held that post for two years instead of one, and in 1699 was appointed principal of the Collège de Beauvais.

Rollin held Jansenist principles, and even went so far as to defend the miracles supposed to be worked at the tomb of François de Paris, commonly known as Deacon Paris. Unfortunately his religious opinions deprived him of his appointments and disqualified him for the rectorship, to which in 1719 he had been re-elected. It is said that the same reason prevented his election to the Académie française, though he was a member of the Academie des Inscriptions. Shortly before his death he protested publicly against the acceptance of the bull Unigenitus.

== Works ==
Rollin's literary work dates chiefly from the later years of his life, when he had been forbidden to teach. His once famous Ancient History (French: Histoire Ancienne, 12 vols., Paris, 1730–38) and the less generally read Roman History (Histoire Romaine, only five of nine volumes finished by the time of his death) were avowed compilations, uncritical and somewhat inaccurate. But they instructed and interested, generation after generation. A more original and really important work was his Treatise on Education (Traité des Études, Paris, 1726–31), which contains a summary of what was even then a reformed and innovative system of education, discarding the medieval traditions that had lingered in France, emphasizing the study of national history after dropping Latin for vernacular in textbooks. Rollin himself didn't begin writing in French until age 60.
