= Fresnes-sur-Escaut =

- Commune
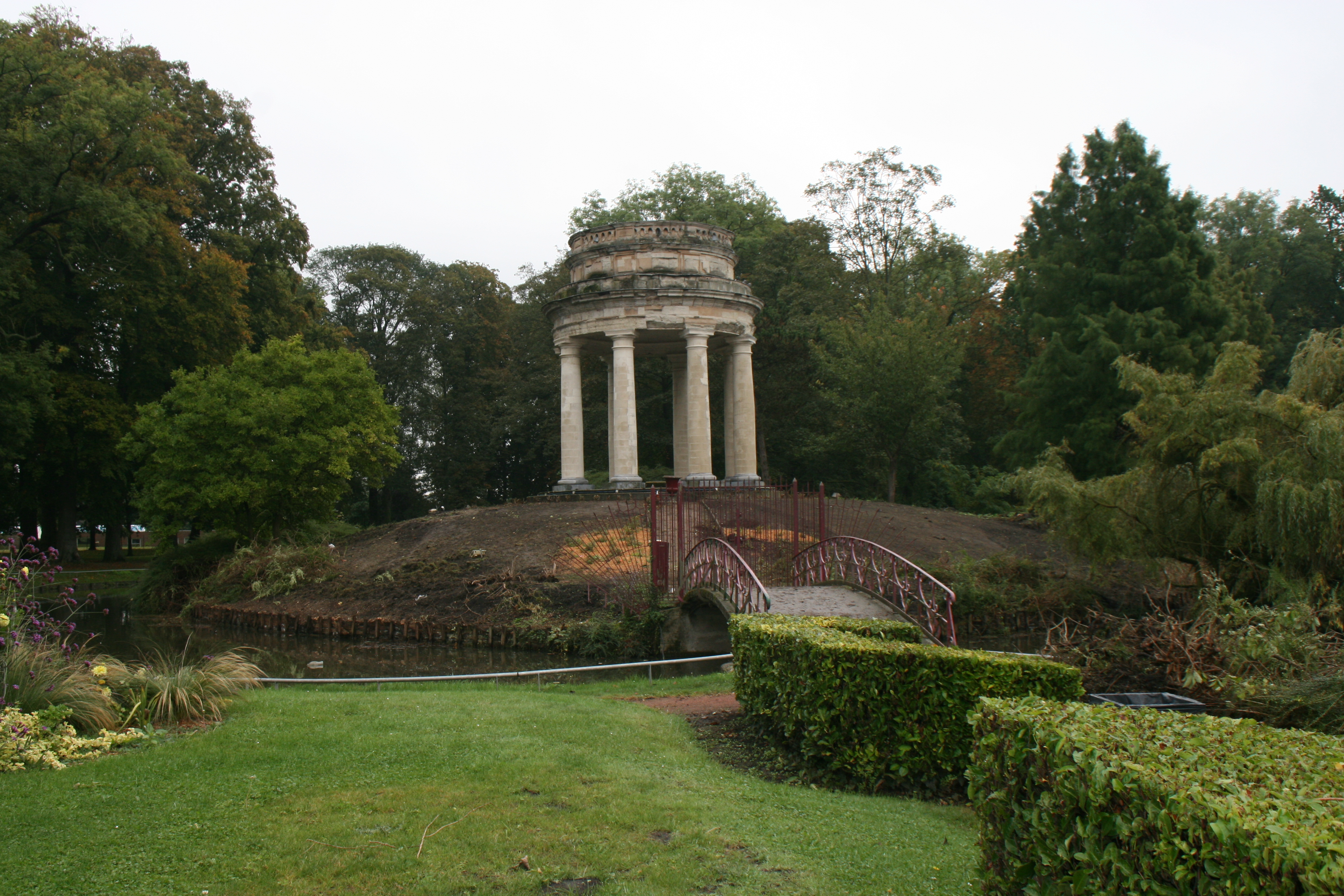
- The Joliot-Curie Park in Fresnes-sur-Escaut

- Coat of arms
- Location of Fresnes-sur-Escaut
- Location within France Location within Hauts-de-France
- Coordinates: 50°26′03″N 3°34′40″E
- Country: France
- Region: Hauts-de-France
- Department: Nord
- Arrondissement: Valenciennes
- Canton: Anzin
- Intercommunality: CA Valenciennes Métropole

Government
  - Mayor (2020–2026): Valérie Fornies
- Area^{1}: 11.77 km^{2} (4.54 sq mi)
- Elevation: 26 m (85 ft)
- Highest elevation: 27 m (89 ft)
- Lowest elevation: 15 m (49 ft)
- Population (2023): 7,354
  - Density: 624.8/km^{2} (1,618/sq mi)
- Time zone: UTC+01:00 (CET)
  - Summer (DST): UTC+02:00 (CEST)
- INSEE/Postal code: 59253 /59970
- ^{1} French Land Register data, which excludes lakes, ponds, glaciers > 1 km^{2} (0.386 sq mi or 247 acres) and river estuaries.

Fresnes-sur-Escaut (French pronunciation: [fʁɛn syʁ ɛsko], literally Fresnes on Escaut) is a commune in the Nord department in northern France.

== Population ==
Historical population
Year	Pop.	±% p.a.
1968	9,069	—
1975	8,373	−1.13%
1982	8,218	−0.27%
1990	8,107	−0.17%
1999	7,607	−0.70%
2007	7,678	+0.12%
2012	7,639	−0.10%
2017	7,565	−0.19%
2023	7,354	−0.47%
Source: INSEE

== Heraldry ==
Arms of Fresnes-sur-Escaut	The arms of Fresnes-sur-Escaut are blazoned : Gules, a chief Or. (La Neuville, Fresnes-sur-Escaut, Ostricourt, Phalempin and Sainghin-en-Weppes use the same arms.)

== See also ==
- Communes of the Nord department
