= Armand Bloch =

French sculptor (1866–1932)

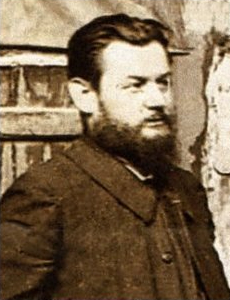
Armand Bloch (c.1900)

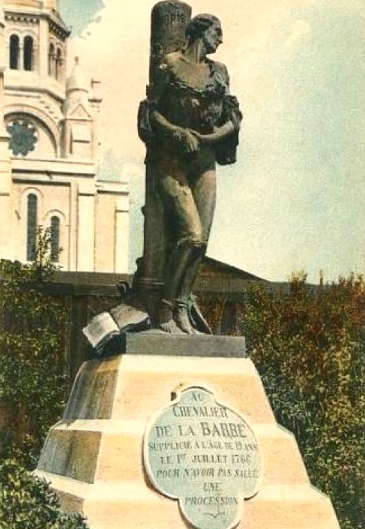
Statue of Barre, from a postcard (c. 1906)

Armand Lucien Bloch (1 July 1866, Montbéliard - 5 March 1932, Paris) was a French sculptor.

== Life and work ==
His father, Maurice Bloch, was a sculptor, who established a metal casting company in 1857. He entered the École des Beaux-Arts in 1884, where he studied with the sculptors Alexandre Falguière and Antonin Mercié. From 1885, he was regular exhibitor at the Salon des Artistes Français, and was a member from 1888 until his death. He was awarded a silver medal there in 1924.

His studio was in Paris, but he maintained close ties with Montbéliard, where his brothers Léon and Julien had taken over the family business. Together with his father, he created a monument for the politician, Pierre-Frédéric Dorian; inaugurated in 1892. It was melted down in 1942, under the Vichy Régime.

In 1900, he obtained a silver medal at the Exposition Universelle. His bronze statue for the martyr, François-Jean de la Barre (1905), was originally at the Basilica of the Sacred Heart, but was transferred to the Square Nadar in 1926. It too was melted down during World War II. In 2001, a replacement was installed.

In addition to his larger works, he created numerous busts; including those of Georges Brétegnier, Victor Hugo, and Alexandre Lunois. Some of his smaller pieces may be seen at the Musée d'Orsay and the Musée du Château des ducs de Wurtemberg.
