= Dictionnaire philosophique =

Work by French philosopher Voltaire, first published in 1764

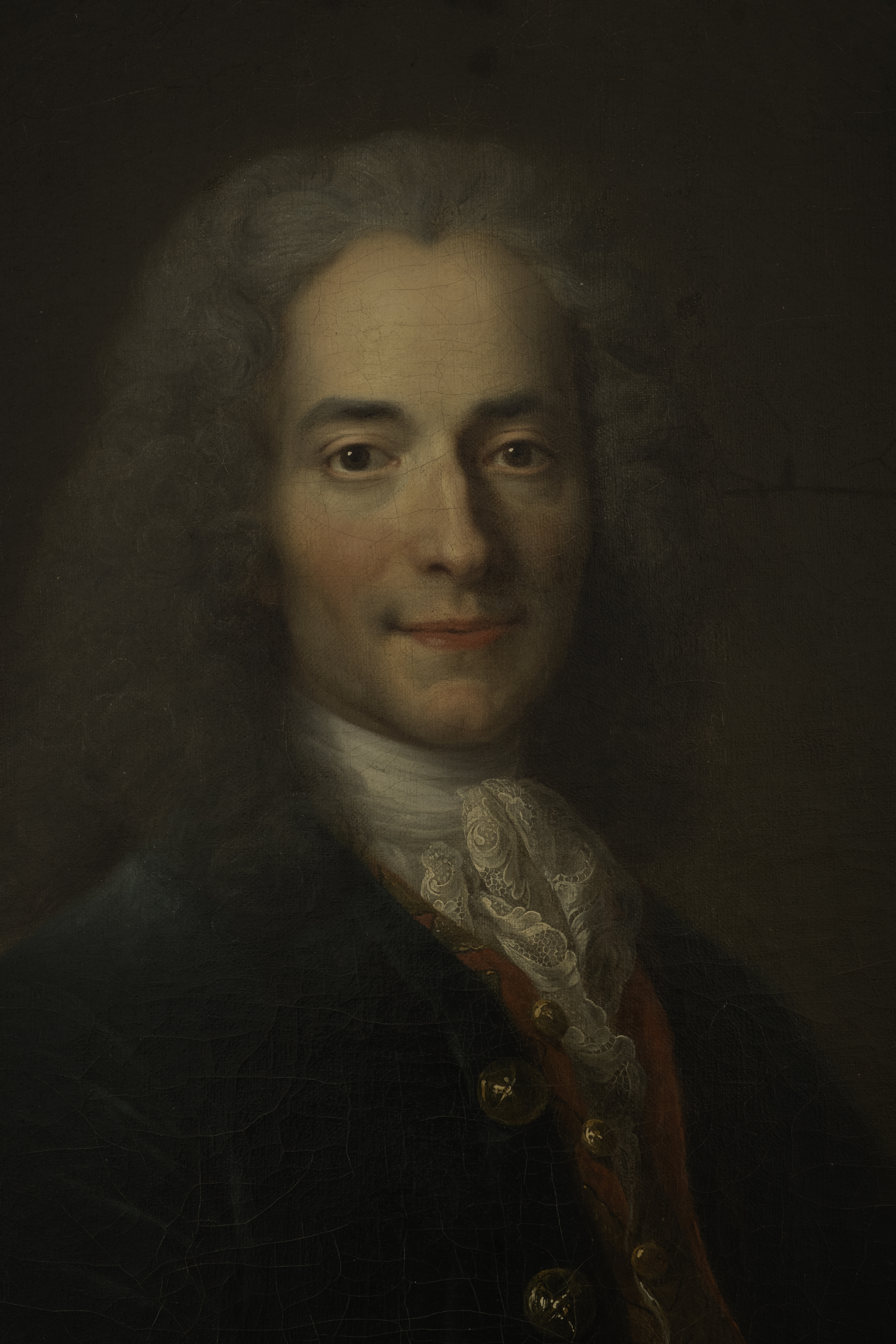
The author, Voltaire

The Dictionnaire philosophique (French: [dik.sjɔ.nɛʁ fi.lo.zɔ.fik]; lit. 'Philosophical Dictionary') is an encyclopedic dictionary published by the Enlightenment thinker Voltaire in 1764. The alphabetically arranged articles often criticize the Roman Catholic Church, Judaism, Islam, and other institutions. The first edition, released in June 1764, went by the name of Dictionnaire philosophique portatif. It was 344 pages and consisted of 73 articles. Later versions were expanded into two volumes consisting of 120 articles.

The first editions were published anonymously in Geneva by Gabriel Grasset. Due to the volatile content of the Dictionnaire, Voltaire chose Grasset over his usual publisher to ensure his own anonymity. There were many editions and reprints of the Dictionnaire during Voltaire's lifetime, but only four of them contained additions and modifications. Furthermore, another work published in 1770, Questions sur l'Encyclopédie, which contained reshaped and modified articles from the Encyclopédie always in alphabetical order, led many following editors to join this and the Dictionnaire (plus other minor works) in a unique opus. The Dictionnaire was a lifelong project for Voltaire. It represents the culmination of his views on Christianity, God, morality and other subjects.

== History and origins ==
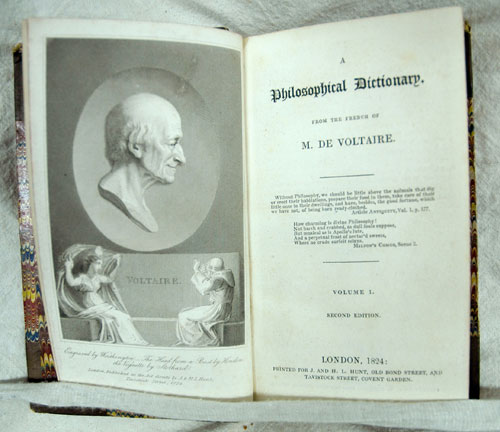
Voltaire; A Philosophical Dictionary. 2nd ed., London: Printed for J. and H.L. Hunt, 1824

The Enlightenment saw the creation of a new way of structuring information in books. The first work to employ this method was the Dictionnaire Historique et Critique (1697) by Pierre Bayle, in which the information is ordered alphabetically. Other important works using a similar structure followed, such as the Encyclopédie by Diderot and Jean d'Alembert. Having witnessed first-hand the popularity and many advantages of this form, Voltaire used this information while preparing the Philosophical Dictionary in 1752, although it was not completed until 1764.

Having had the opportunity to write his Dictionary at a later point in time, Voltaire saw that there were certain problems with previous dictionaries, chiefly that they were all lengthy, and thus very expensive and inaccessible for much of the population. Voltaire sought to create a text which would fit in one's pocket and be affordable because "revolutionary material must be small enough for people to carry with them". What he created is a text which educated and amused at the same time.

Voltaire's motivations for writing the Philosophical Dictionary can be seen as serendipitous. The idea was spawned at a dinner party in the court of Prince Frederick II of Prussia in 1752, during which he and other guests each agreed to write an article and share them the next morning. Voltaire consequently was the only guest to take the game seriously and the idea cascaded to form the Philosophical Dictionary.

== Structure ==
The Philosophical Dictionary is structured in the tradition of Bayle, Diderot and d'Alembert – that is to say, alphabetically ordered. Although this order helps readers more easily find articles, this was not meant to be a dictionary or encyclopaedia in the same totalizing way of d'Alembert's project. Voltaire's writing is neither objective nor varied in opinion; the same arguments are made throughout the Philosophical Dictionary emphasizing the point of his discontent.

== Themes ==
Many of the themes addressed by Voltaire in this book are addressed or touched upon in his work L'Infame. In this and other works, Voltaire is very concerned about the injustices of the Catholic Church, which he sees as intolerant and fanatical. At the same time, his work espouses deism (though he calls it theism, contrary to its modern meaning), tolerance and freedom of the press.

== Influences ==
Because this work was written late in the author's life, coupled with the fact that it is compiled of articles written over an extended period of time, the work had many influences, which noticeably change, depending on the theme which the article addresses.

The first major influence on the Philosophical Dictionary is Voltaire's visit to England, which gave him the opportunity to compare the problems in France with a place that had free press and to become better acquainted with important and influential thinkers such as Locke and Newton. Newtonian theory is influential in many of the articles that deal with tolerance stating that if we "do not know the essence of things we will not persecute others", for those things.

The Calas affair was an event that shaped Voltaire during the creation of the Philosophical Dictionary. Jean Calas was a Calvinist who was wrongfully convicted of killing his son. This occurred because there had been a rumour that the murder was fueled by Calas' son conversion to Catholicism. David de Beaudrige, who was in charge of the case, upon hearing this rumour, had the Calas family arrested without inquiry. Voltaire used this theme in the Philosophical Dictionary to fight against the Catholic Church.

== Reception ==
The reception of the Philosophical Dictionary at the time was mixed. On one hand, the book saw a very strong reception on the part of the general public. The first edition was quickly sold out; many more editions were needed to keep up with the demand. Enlightened rulers such as Frederick II of Prussia and Catherine II of Russia both have been recorded as supporters of the book.

On the other hand, the Philosophical Dictionary was despised by religious authorities, who had a very important influence over what works were to be censored. The Philosophical Dictionary was censored in many countries, including Switzerland (Geneva) and France. In these countries, all available copies of the book were collected and burned in the town square. Voltaire, who remained an anonymous author, was repeatedly asked if he minded that the Portatif was being burned, but he calmly replied that he had no reason to be upset.

== Bibliography ==
- Gay, Peter (1959). Voltaire's Politics: The Poet as Realist. Princeton: Princeton University Press.
- Voltaire; Peter Gay (1962). Philosophical Dictionary. New York: Basic Books, Inc.
- Voltaire; Theodore Besterman (1971). Philosophical Dictionary. Harmondsworth: Penguin Books.
- Orieux, Jean; Barbara Bray; Helen R. Lane (1979). Voltaire. Garden City: Doubleday and Company. ISBN 9780385085670.
- Pearson, Roger (2005). Voltaire Almighty: A Life in Pursuit of Freedom. New York: Bloomsbury.
