= Marie Duhem =

French painter

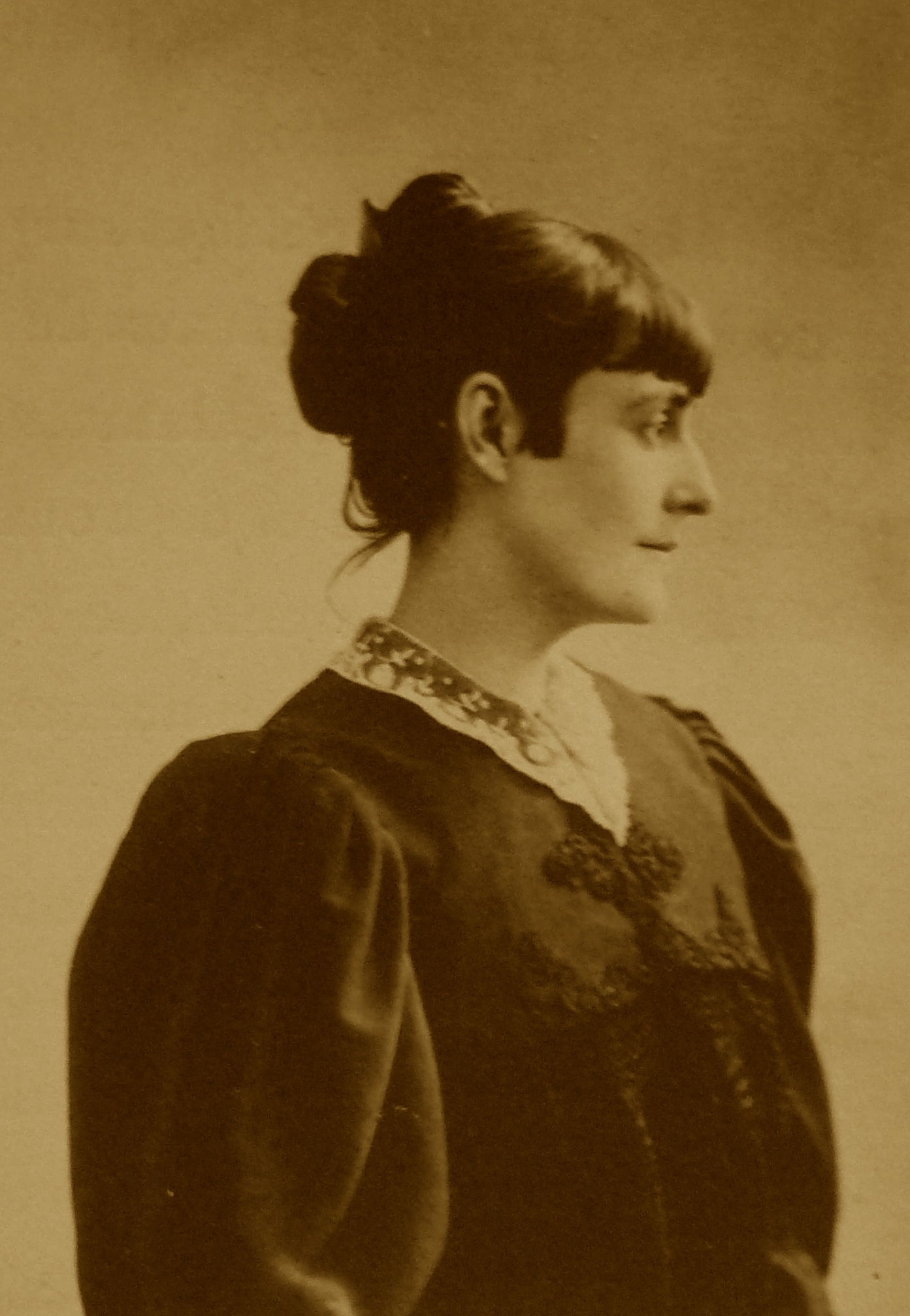
Marie Duhem (c.1900)

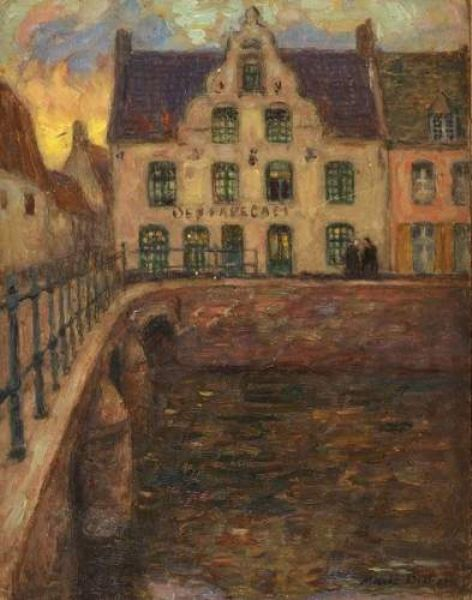
Café on the Corner of the Bridge (c.1900)

Marie Duhem, born Marie Amélie Hortense Sergeant (18 March 1871 in Guemps – 9 July 1918 in Douai) was a French painter.

== Biography ==
Her parents operated a lace factory, so she became familiar with the work of designers and models from an early age. She began her art studies with Adrien Demont, husband of the painter Virginie Demont-Breton. It was at their workshop in Wissant that she met her future husband, the painter Henri Duhem, eleven years her senior. They married in 1890. After establishing their home in Camiers, they gathered their artist friends and acquaintances together to form what became known as the "École de Wissant", and would paint in the surrounding areas of Boulogne and the Côte d'Opale. Some of the better-known members of this group include Georges Maroniez, Francis Tattegrain and Fernand Stiévenart.

In addition to painting, the Duhems were avid art collectors, especially interested in Post-Impressionism. Their collection included significant paintings by Claude Monet and Paul Gauguin. In 1985 Nelly Sergeant-Duhem, their adopted daughter, donated the collection to the Académie des Beaux-Arts. It is currently preserved at the Musée Marmottan.

She was named an Officer in the Ordre des Palmes Académiques and, in 1912, a Chevalier in the Légion d'honneur.

In 1915 their only son, Rémy, was killed in the assault on Les Éparges. She never fully recovered from this loss, neglected her health, and died of a tumor at the age of forty-seven.
