= Georges Maroniez =

French painter

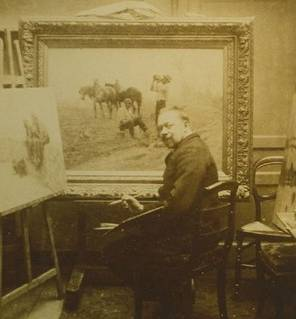
- Georges Maroniez in his studio (1892)
- Born: 1865; Douai, France
- Died: 1933 (aged 68); Paris, France
- Education: Pierre Billet, Adrien Demont
- Known for: Painting, Photography
- Movement: Realism
- Spouse: Jeanne Dutemple
- Awards: Légion d'Honneur

Georges Philibert Charles Maroniez (17 January 1865 – 11 December 1933) was a French painter, specializing in landscapes with figures.

== Biography ==
=== Education and first works ===
Maroniez was the son of an industrialist who owned a sugar refinery in Montigny-en-Ostrevent. He displayed artistic talent at an early age, but – although not discouraged – was expected to pursue a more professional career. Accordingly, he studied law, and afterwards served as a magistrate in, successively, Boulogne-sur-Mer (1891), Avesnes-sur-Helpe (1894) and Cambrai (1897).

While attending law school, he also took courses at the École des Beaux-Arts of Douai and became a student of Pierre Billet in Cantin. It was there that he met the painter Adrien Demont, the son-in-law of Jules Breton. Urged on by Breton, at the age of 22 he started exhibiting peasant genre and landscape scenes in Douai and Paris. He began vacationing in Wissant, where he stayed with Demont and his wife, Virginie Demont-Breton, painting the coastal scenery and becoming associated with the "École de Wissant", founded by Henri and Marie Duhem. In 1889, he became a member of the Société des Artistes Français.

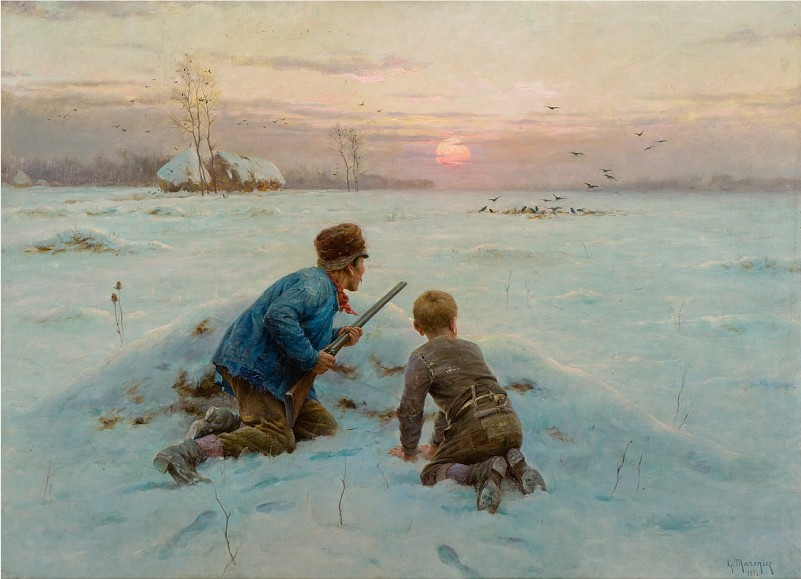
Enemies of the Harvest (1894)

At the annual Salon des artistes français, he was awarded an Honorable Mention in 1891, a 3rd Medal in 1905, and a 2nd Medal in 1906. Defying the label of "marine painter", he filled his genre scene paintings with Flemish realism. Using a luminous, caressing light, he transposed the grey country roads of his birthplace with light, and painted eloquent snowy landscapes. He painted ports of Brittany, France, Belgium and the Netherlands, as well as numerous scenes of the fisherman's life, especially at twilight or night. He captured the magnetic beauty of an ocean sunset, and the tranquility that beauty and light brings.

=== Inventions ===
Maroniez also became interested in photography and invented one of the first hand-held cameras, a device which he soon simplified, named the "Sphynx" and patented in 1891. The camera used a type of film invented by chemist Victor Planchon, a relative of his. He travelled widely throughout the Mediterranean, North Africa and the Middle East, using his device to take over 1,600 images that are in the collection of the museum in Cambrai. Later he devised and patented a method of suppressing the vibrations and jerky movements produced by the cinematographs of the Lumière Brothers, which had its unveiling in 1899 at the Société Photographique in Cambrai.

In 1905, the success of his paintings and the anti-clerical attitudes of the Combes administration led him to resign from the judiciary, and to devote himself entirely to art.

=== World War I and maturity ===
In August 1914, Maroniez was drafted into Military Justice. In 1918 he was created a Knight of the Légion d'honneur. During the German occupation of north-east France, his studio was looted, and his wife was deported, with hundreds of other French civilian hostages, to Holzminden internment camp in Lower Saxony. The family was reunited only after the ceasefire; they relocated to Paris in 1919.
He subsequently took most of his inspiration from Brittany. His works were very popular but, according to some critics, became repetitive and too commercial. Over 800 paintings are attributed to him, of which the majority are in private collections. He died of a heart attack in 1933 and was interred in the family vault at Cambrai.

== Gallery ==
Works by Georges Maroniez

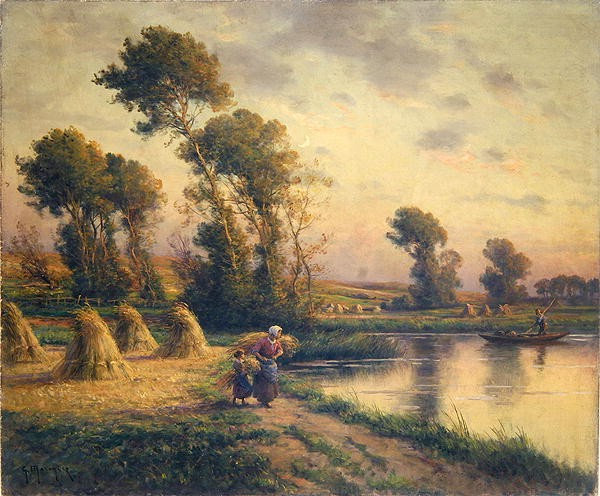
Rural landscape (1893), oil on canvas, New York, Dahesh Museum of Art.

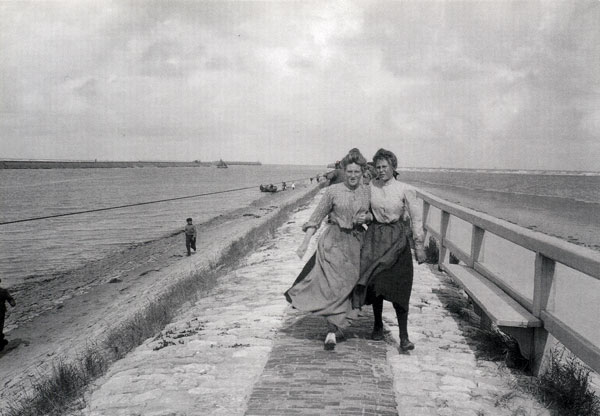
Girls strolling on East wharf (1904), photographic glass plate, photothèque de Cambrai.

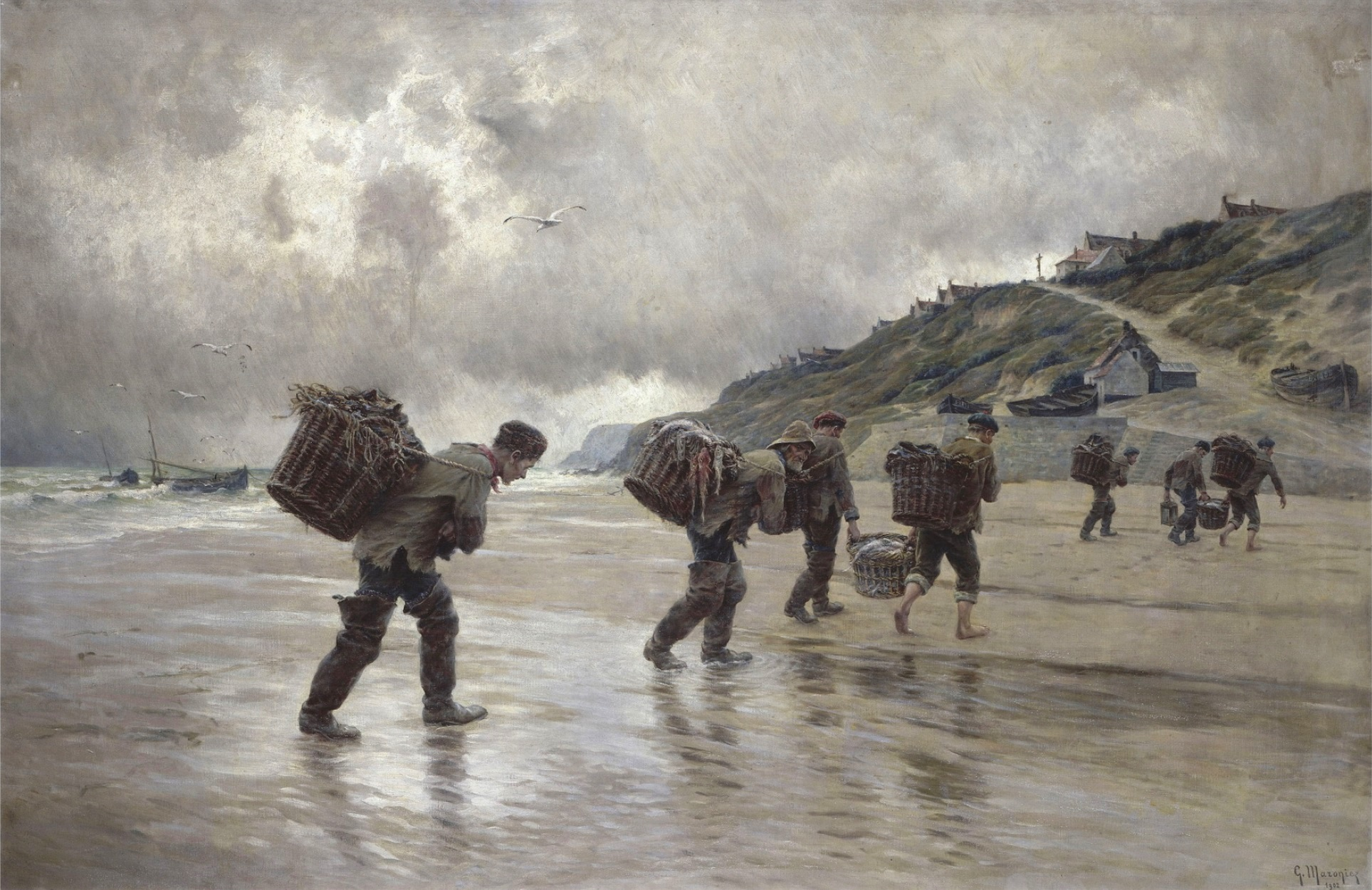
Fishermen of Equihen, 1902, oil on canvas, Palais des Beaux-Arts de Lille.

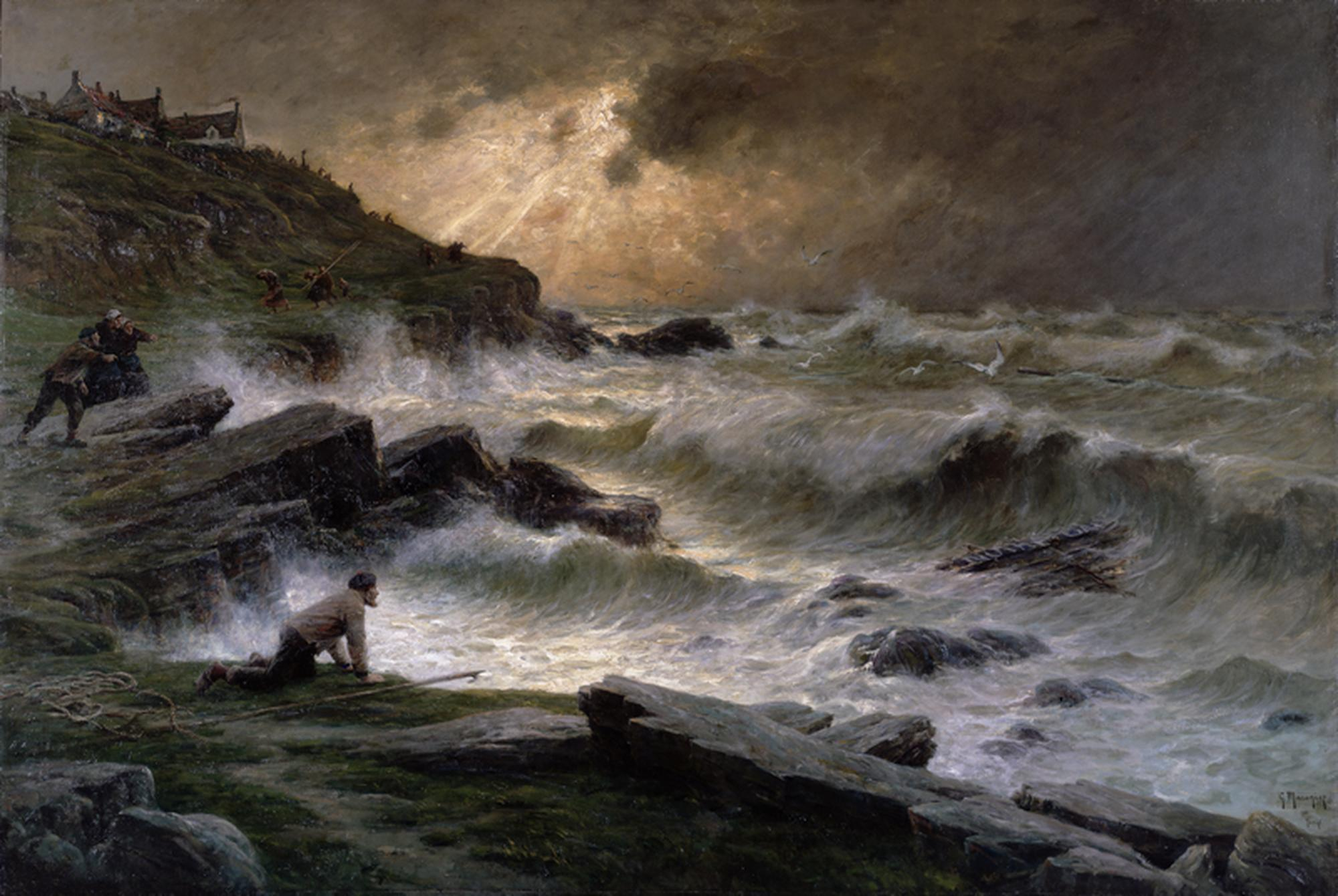
Sad news (1911) oil on canvas, private collection.

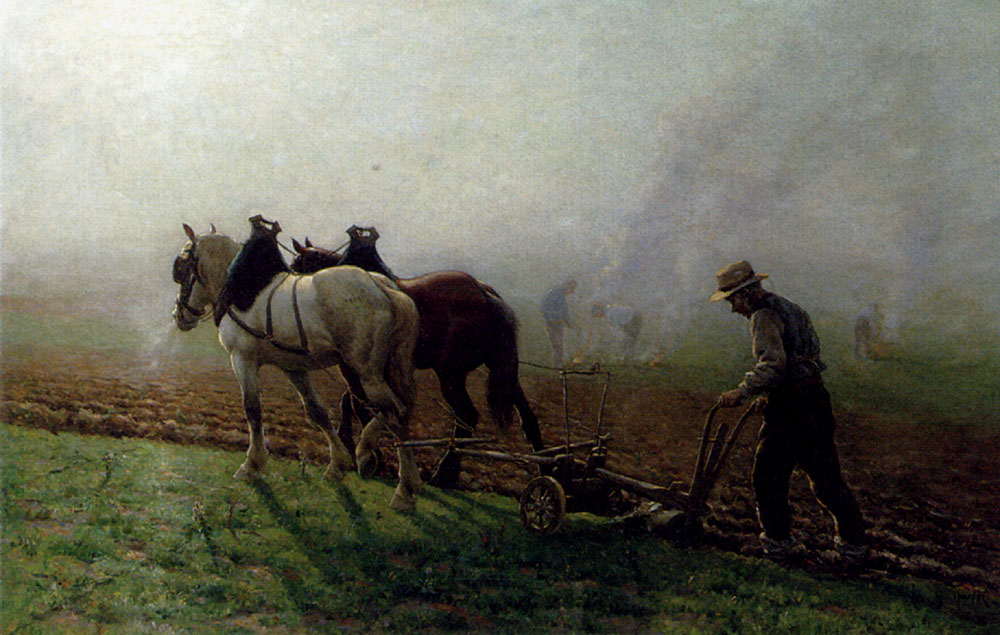
The ploughman, oil on canvas, private collection.

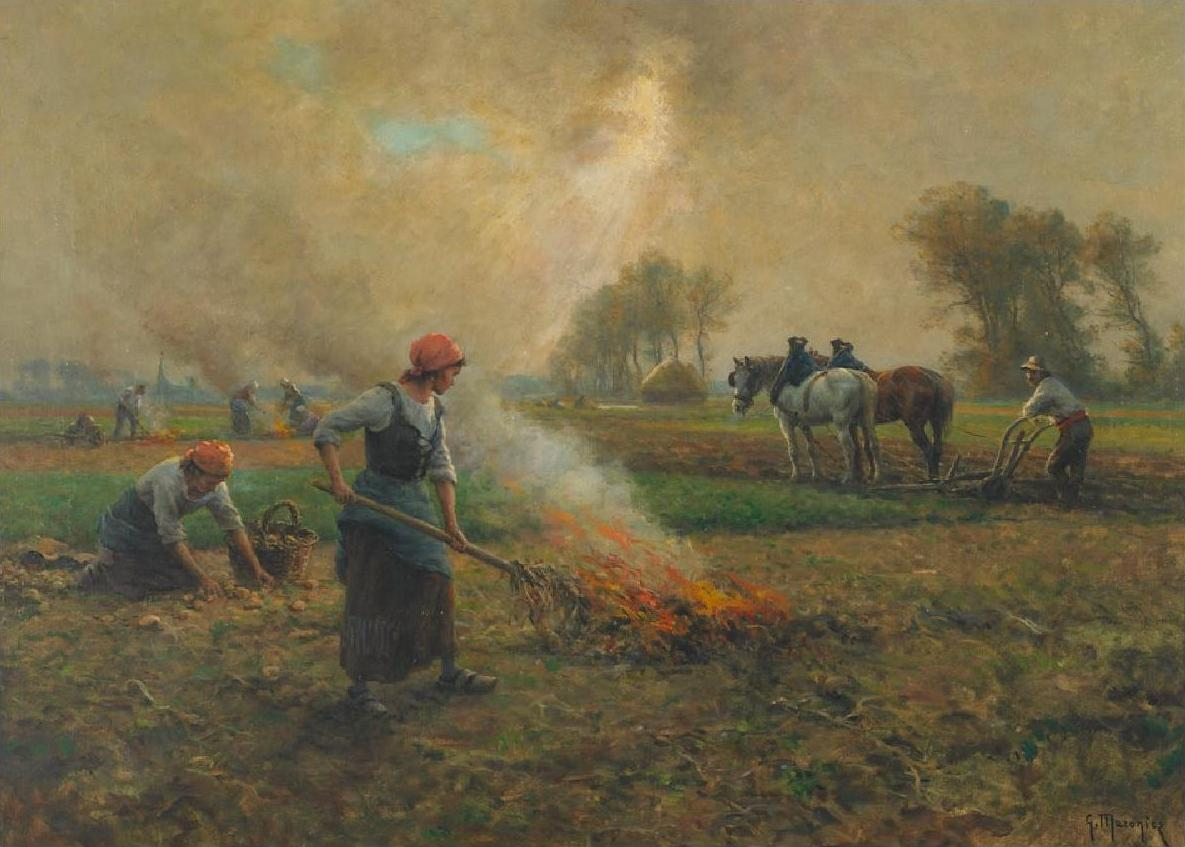
Peace and plenty, oil on canvas, private collection.

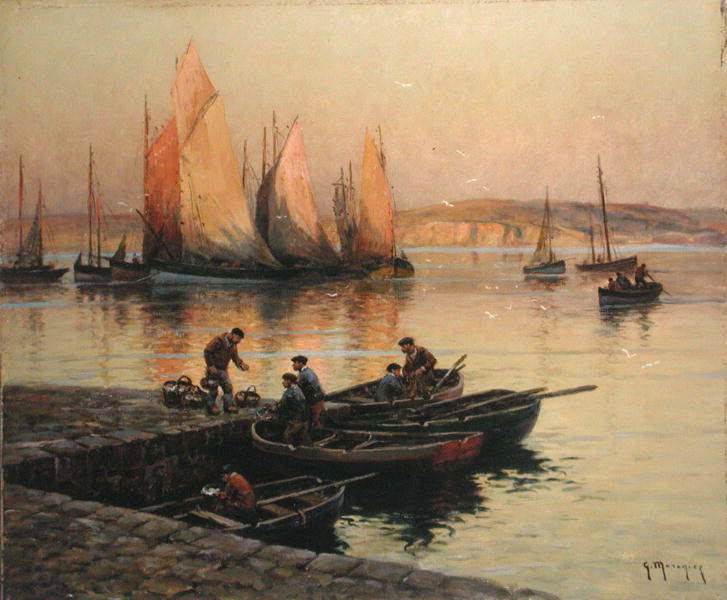
Sunset, oil on canvas, private collection.

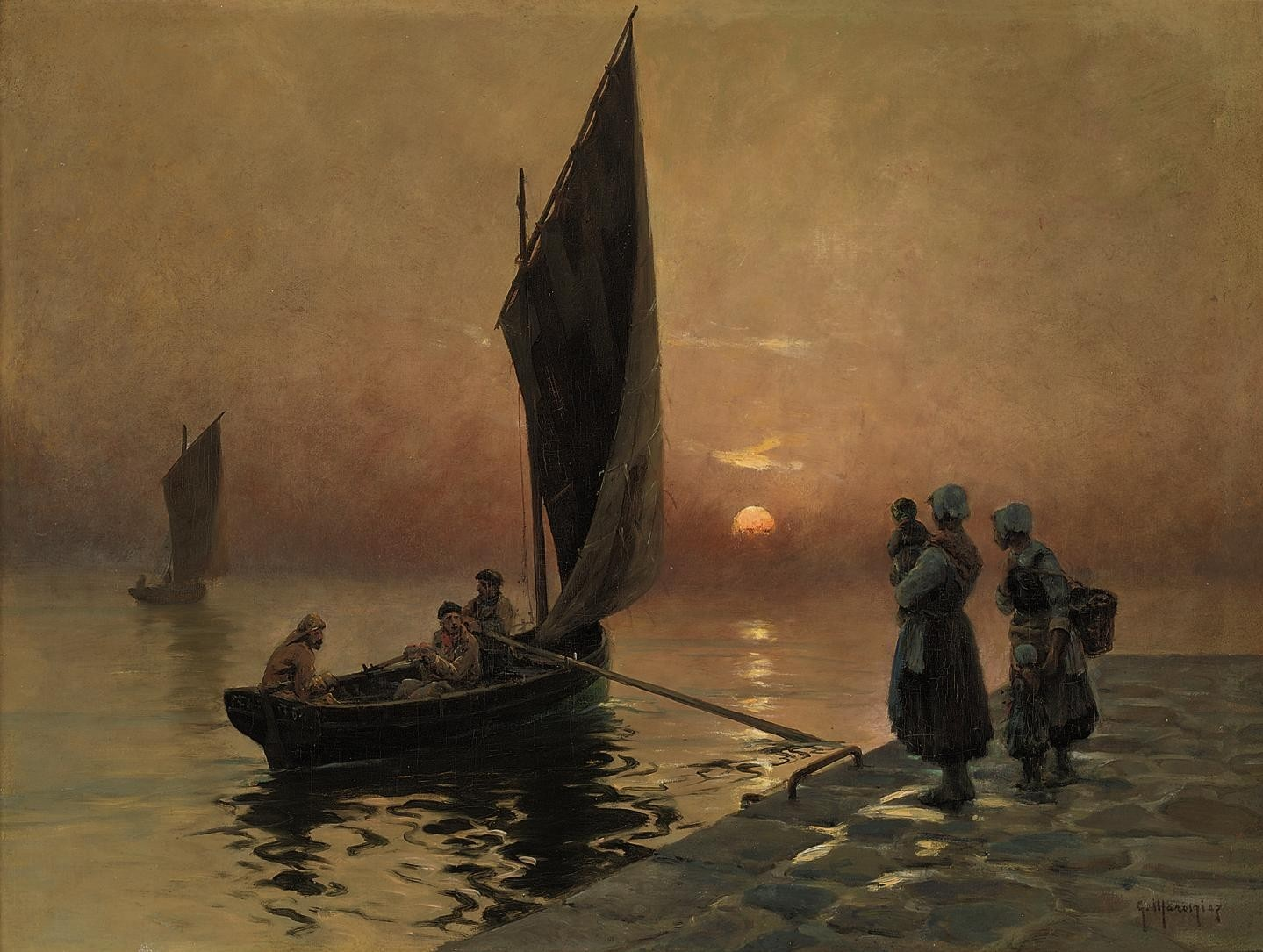
The return of the fishermen, oil on canvas, private collection.

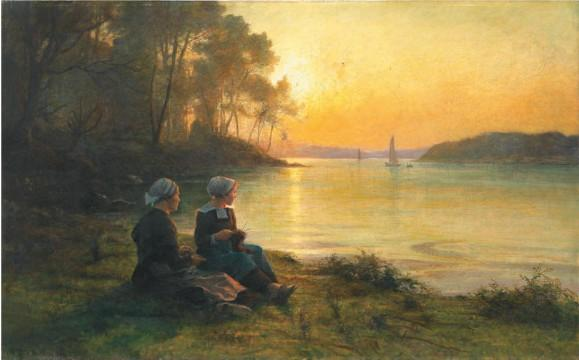
Along the Odet river (1914), pastel on canvas, private collection.

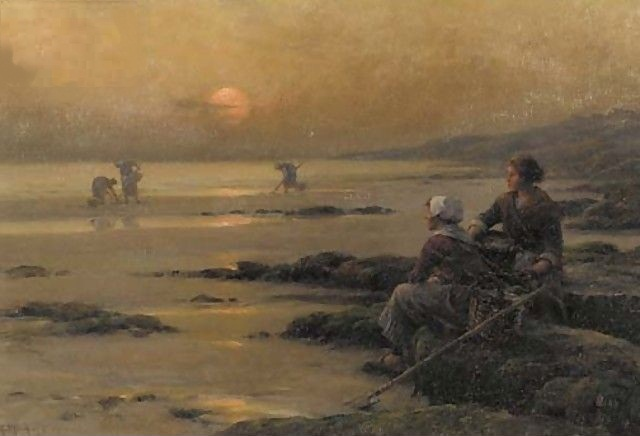
Cockling at dusk, oil on canvas, private collection.

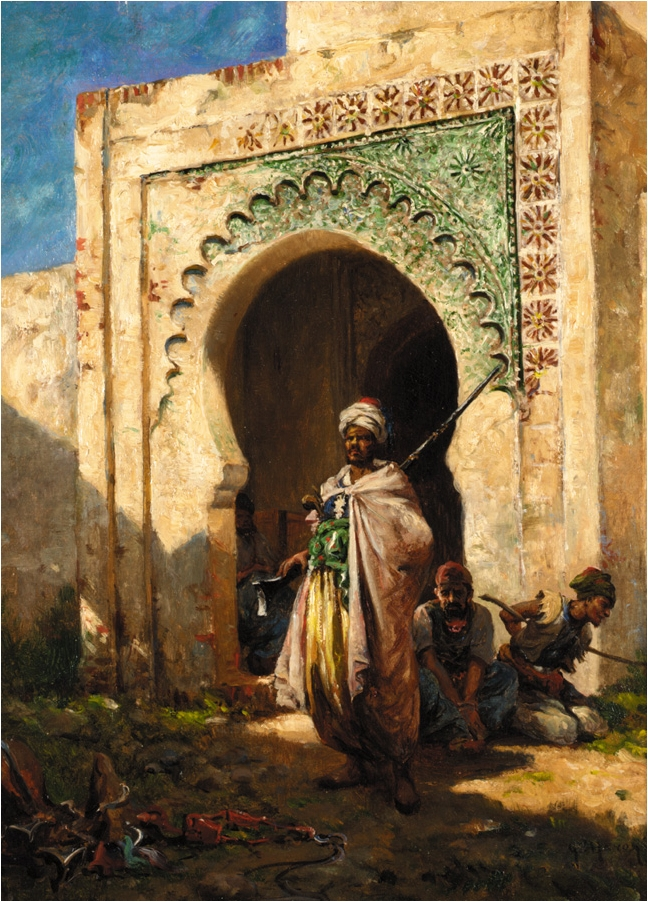
The Guard, oil on canvas, private collection.
