= Henri Duhem =

French painter (1860–1941)

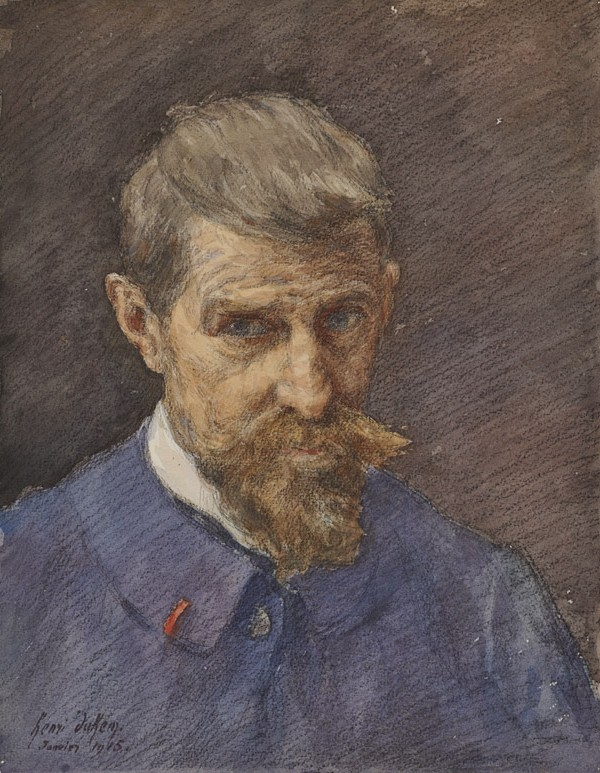
Self-portrait (1915)

Henri Aimé Duhem (7 April 1860 in Douai – 24 October 1941 in Juan-les-Pins) was a French Impressionist painter.

== Biography ==
He was descended from an old Flemish family and originally practiced as a lawyer. In 1887, his passion for drawing and watercolors finally led him to go to Paris and enroll in the drawing classes of Henri Harpignies. While there, he became friends with Émile Breton, who introduced him to oil painting. Breton's niece, Virginie Demont-Breton (the daughter of Jules Breton), introduced him to a young painter named Marie Sergeant, whom he married in 1890.

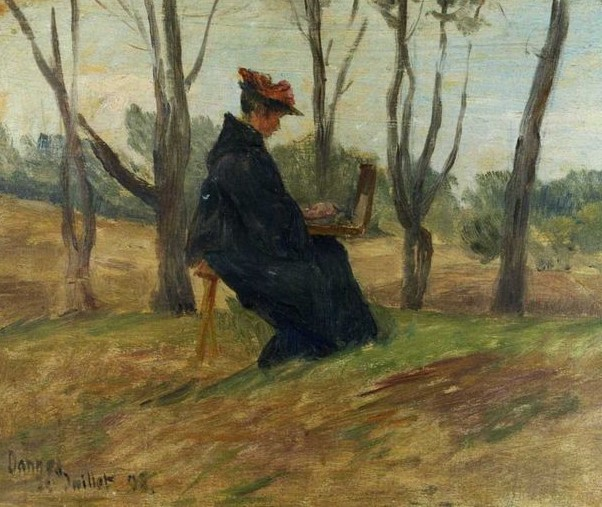
Marie Duhem Painting (1893)

At about that time, Demont-Breton moved to a small village named Wissant. Encouraged to follow, the Duhems established a home in Camiers and gathered their artist friends together to form what would be known as the "École de Wissant", some of the most notable members of which were Georges Maroniez, Francis Tattegrain and Fernand Stiévenart. In 1893, he fully abandoned his legal career to devote himself to art, both as a creator and an avid collector of work by his contemporaries. He and his wife travelled extensively as he began to exhibit more widely abroad.

=== Personal losses ===
During the early part of World War I, he and Marie lost their only son Rémy at the assault on Les Éparges (20 June 1915). Marie was deeply affected and never truly recovered. She died of a neglected tumor in 1918, during the occupation. Because of his legal experience, Duhem was called upon to assist with the administration of Douai. His painful memories of this period are recorded in a book called La Mort du foyer (The Death of a Home, Éditions Figuière, 1922).

In the inter-war period, he remained artistically active, preparing a major show at the Salon des Tuileries in 1923, commuting between Douai and Paris, where he maintained a home in the Sixteenth Arrondissement. In 1932, he was named a Commander in the Légion d'honneur. Five years later, faced with declining health and the threat of war, he moved to Juan-les-Pins, where he lived at the villa "Mont Riant" until his death.

In 1985, his priceless art collection was donated to the Musée Marmottan by his adopted daughter Nelly, following his wishes.

== Other writings by Duhem ==
- Renaissances, éditions Clerget, 1897.
- Impressions d’Art Contemporain, éditions Figuière, 1913.
- Ève ou l'épicier, éditions de la Flandre, 1935.
