= Lewys Daron =

Lewys Daron (fl. c. 1495 – c. 1530) was a Welsh-language professional poet from the Llŷn area of Gwynedd, Wales. Although not considered to be one of the foremost of the Poets of the Nobility, his work provides a portrait of the gentry society of north-west Wales at the start of the Tudor period.

On the basis of his name and a reference to him in a later 16th-century manuscript in the hand of the antiquary Thomas Wiliems, it can confidently be accepted that he was a native of the parish of Aberdaron in Llŷn. His date of birth is not known and our knowledge of him depends almost entirely on the evidence of his poetry, of which 28 poems survive. He was a friend of the Anglesey poet Lewys Môn, one of the most important poets of that period. He probably died in the early 1530s and was buried in Nefyn.

Lewys Daron sang to patrons in Arfon, Meirionnydd, Eifionydd and Llŷn, an area corresponding to the modern county of Gwynedd in north-west Wales. His poems, in the Welsh traditional metres, include awdlau and cywyddau. His patrons included the Stradlings and the gentry families of Penrhyn, Bodfel, Bodeon, Glynllifon, Carreg, Cochwillan (near Bethesda), Plas Iolyn (near Ysbyty Ifan) and others.

He is perhaps best known for his elegy (marwnad) to the renowned poet Tudur Aled (d. 1526), whom he knew. His work includes a cywydd on behalf of three ladies of Anglesey requesting a millstone for the parish church of Nefyn and another cywydd on behalf of Sir John Wynn of Gwydir asking for a stallion from Dafydd, Prior of Beddgelert. He also wrote a praise poem to Pîrs Conwy, Archdeacon of Llanelwy (St Asaph).

== Bibliography ==
- A. Cynfael Lake (ed.), Gwaith Lewys Daron (University of Wales Press, 1994).
