= Arvon =

Arvon may refer to:

- Arvon Foundation
- Arvon Township, Michigan
- Mount Arvon

== See also ==
- Arfon (disambiguation)
