= UC-61 =

UC-61 may refer to:

- SM UC-61, a World War I German coastal minelaying submarine
- Fairchild 24, an airplane with a United States military designation of "UC-61"
