= Camiers =

- Commune
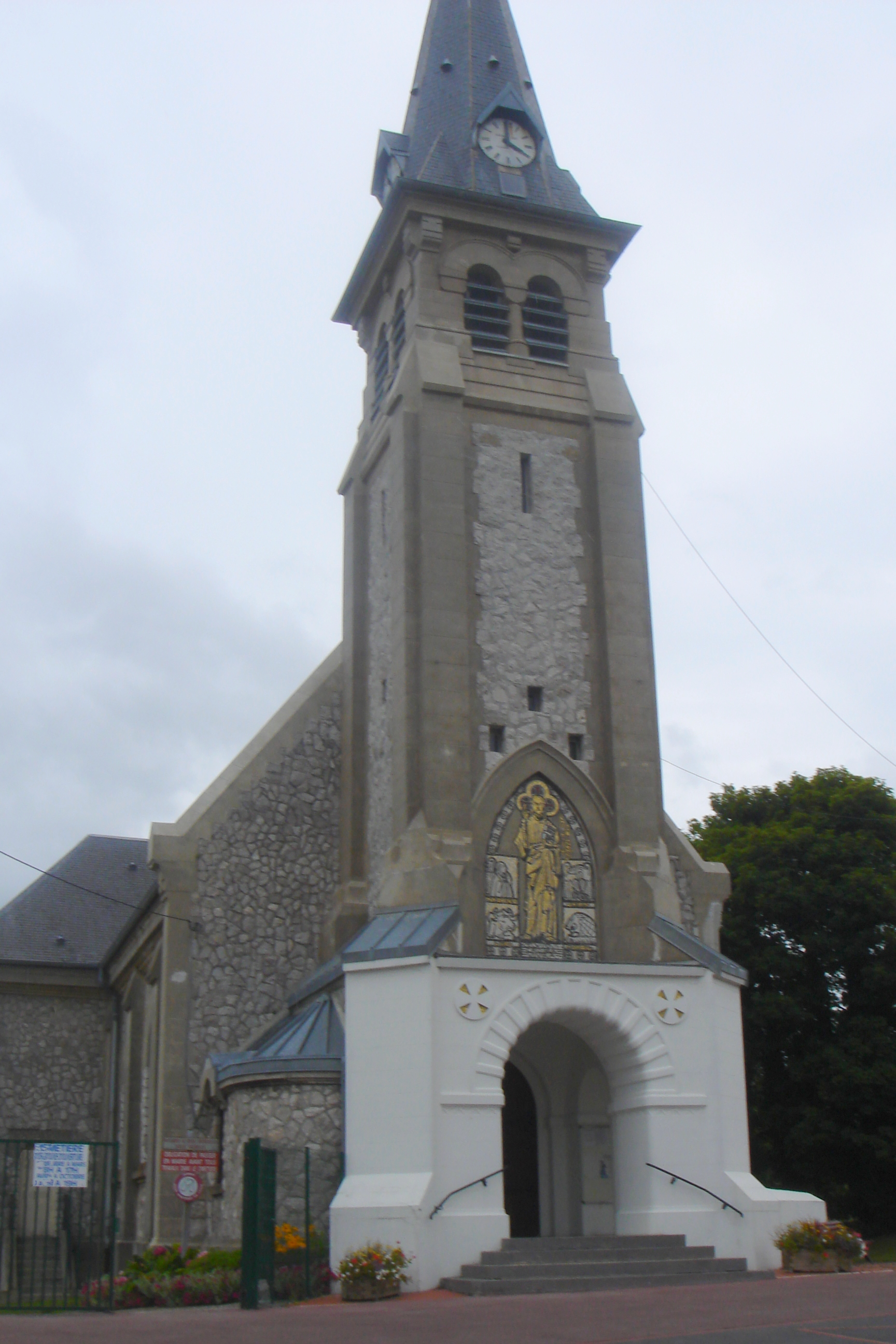
- The church of Camiers

- Coat of arms
- Location of Camiers
- Location within France Location within Hauts-de-France
- Coordinates: 50°34′00″N 1°36′52″E
- Country: France
- Region: Hauts-de-France
- Department: Pas-de-Calais
- Arrondissement: Montreuil
- Canton: Étaples
- Intercommunality: CA Deux Baies en Montreuillois

Government
  - Mayor (2020–2026): Gaston Callewaert
- Area^{1}: 16.13 km^{2} (6.23 sq mi)
- Elevation: 23 m (75 ft)
- Highest elevation: 176 m (577 ft)
- Lowest elevation: 2 m (6.6 ft)
- Population (2023): 2,582
  - Density: 160.1/km^{2} (414.6/sq mi)
- Time zone: UTC+01:00 (CET)
  - Summer (DST): UTC+02:00 (CEST)
- INSEE/Postal code: 62201 /62176
- ^{1} French Land Register data, which excludes lakes, ponds, glaciers > 1 km^{2} (0.386 sq mi or 247 acres) and river estuaries.

Camiers (French pronunciation: [kamje]) is a commune in the Pas-de-Calais department in Hauts-de-France in France.

== Geography ==
The area of the commune is 16 km^{2} (6.2 sq mi). The village of Camiers itself is small and stands just inland from the dunes on the south-west and west-facing coast just north of Étaples. The space between the village and the mouth of the River Canche is occupied by a nature reserve in the dunes. The local solid geology is the Cretaceous plateau of Artois with the Boulonnais just to the north. In its highest part, the commune rises onto the Upper Cretaceous at 176 metres but most lies on the levelled marine sand which in the medieval period, was off-shore.

The coastal road, the D940 now by-passes the village to the west while the main traffic between Calais and Abbeville is carried by the Autoroute A16 on the higher ground to the east. The Autoroute briefly passes through the eastern extremity of the commune.

== History ==
Camiers belonged to the Lordship of Noailles. However the waters of the lagoon between the dunes and the shore of the solid geology, for many years, presented an obstacle to its development.

During the First World War the flat lands were the site of the huge base depot of the British army in France. It is usually known nowadays as Étaples camp. Through most of the war, close to it and part of the same complex, Camiers camp was the base depot, in France, of the Machine Gun Corps. Its home base depot was at Belton Park, near Grantham.

In the 1890s, painters Henri and Marie Huhem established themselves in Camiers and gathered other artists around them. The group would be known as "L'école de Wissant", taking the name of the nearby commune where Virginie Demont-Breton lived.

== Demography ==
In 2018, there were 1,115 households, of which 340 were of one person.

Historical population
Year	Pop.	±% p.a.
1968	2,088	—
1975	2,064	−0.17%
1982	2,093	+0.20%
1990	2,176	+0.49%
1999	2,252	+0.38%
2007	2,654	+2.07%
2012	2,686	+0.24%
2017	2,717	+0.23%
2023	2,582	−0.85%
Source: INSEE

== Sites and monuments ==
- Camiers mill
- Saint Gabriel Plage. Location of the Grand Hôtel, which was destroyed by the sea in 1912.
- Sainte Cécile Plage
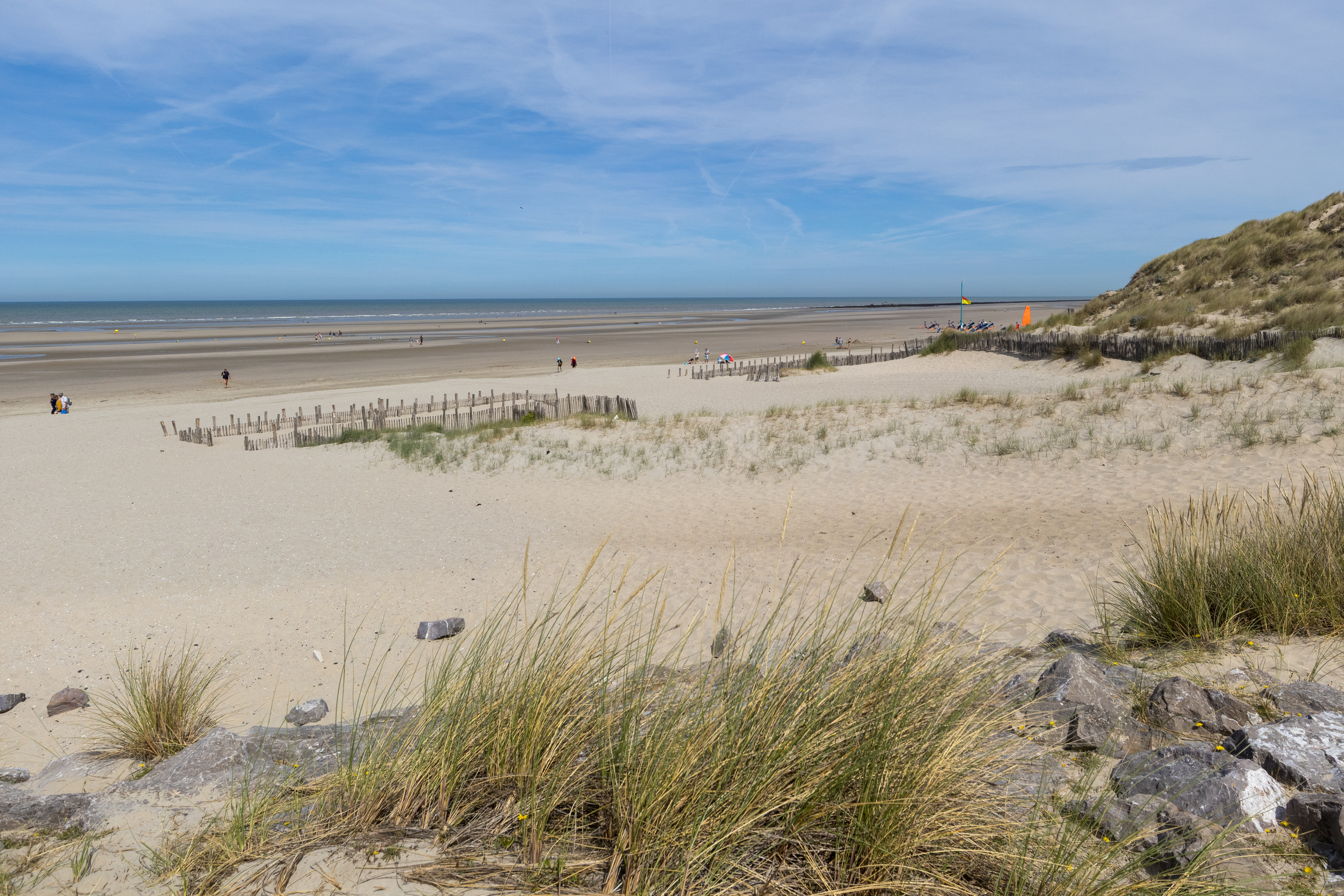
  Sainte Cécile Plage
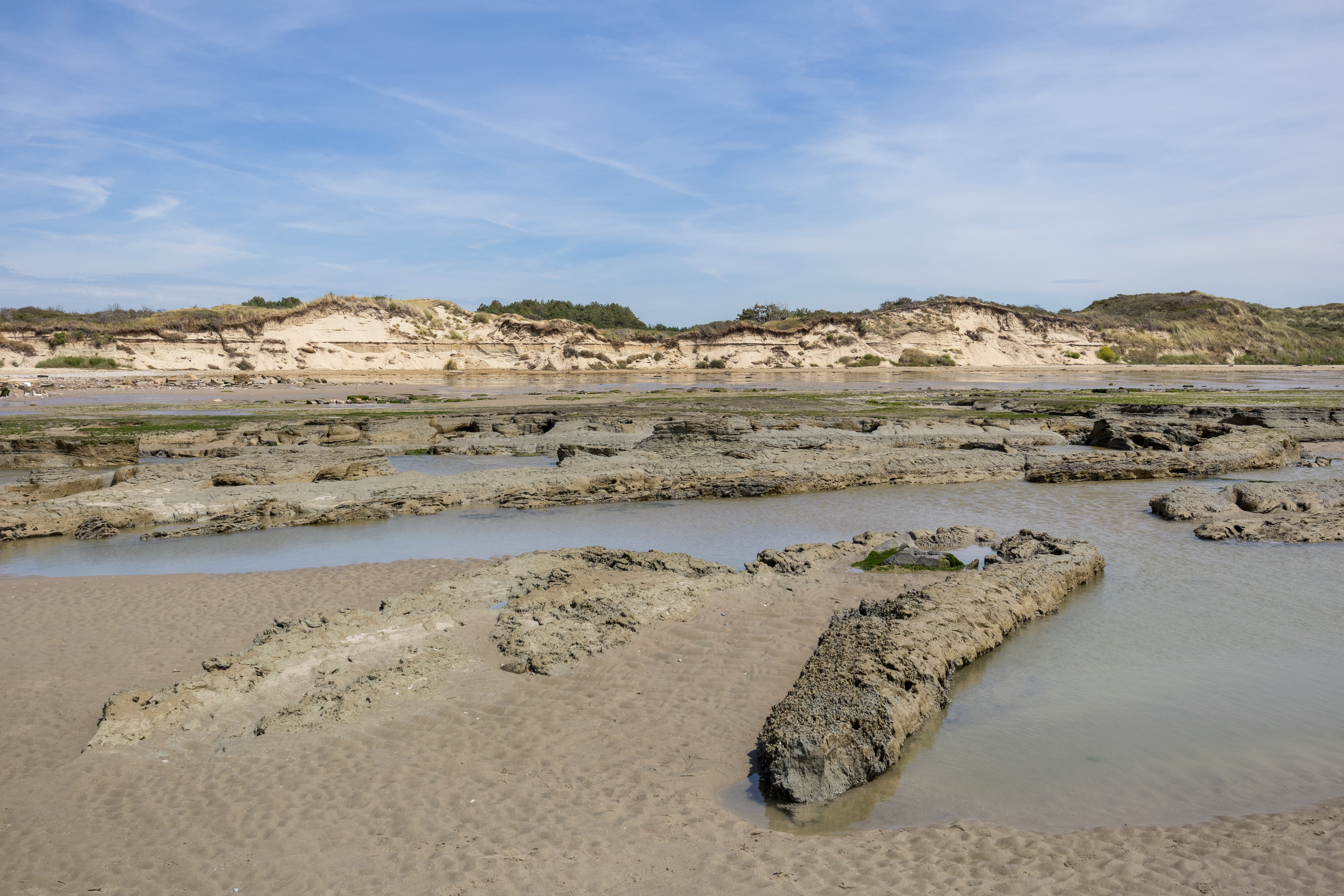
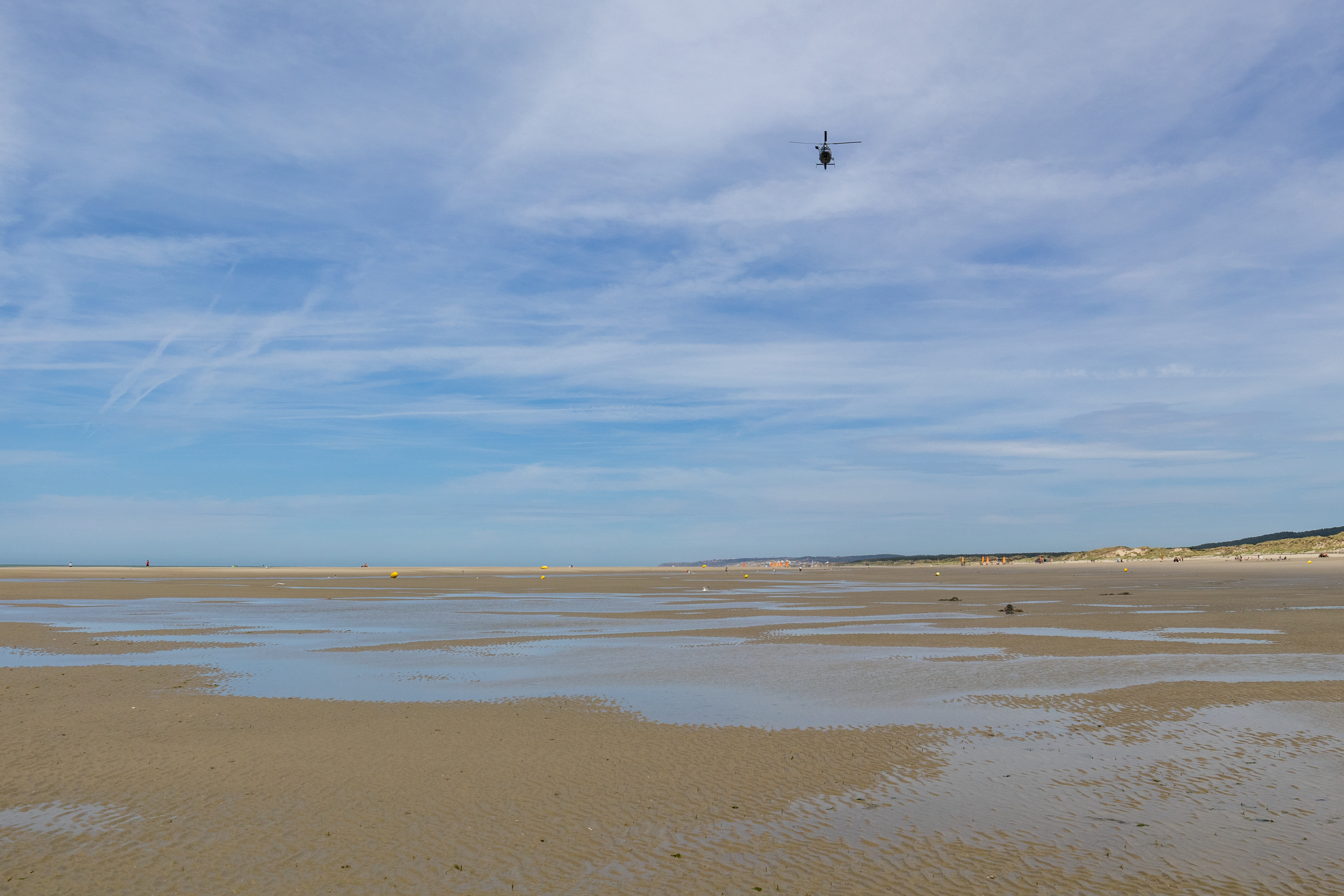
  . Most visitors go there for swimming.
- Hotel les Cedres - Schools stay there.

== See also ==
- Communes of the Pas-de-Calais department
