= Cochwillan =

Medieval hall house in Gwynedd, Wales

Coordinates: 53.20352°N 4.08711°W

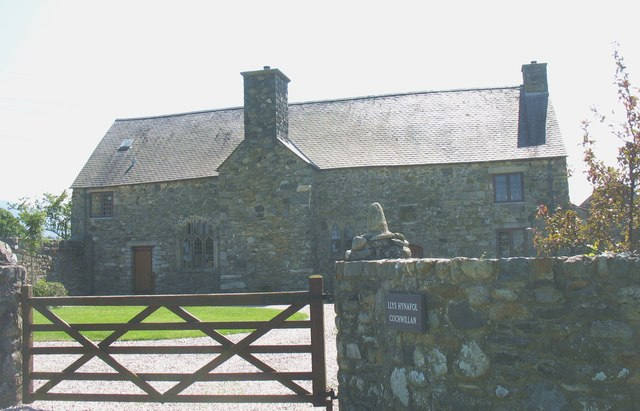
Cochwillan medieval hall-house

Cochwillan is a medieval hall house situated in the lower Ogwen Valley, south of the village of Talybont in the parish of Llanllechid, between Bethesda and Llandygai. It is designated by Cadw as a Grade I listed building.

== History ==
Cochwillan was built around 1465 by William ap Gruffudd who for supporting Henry Tudor at the Battle of Bosworth was rewarded by being named Sheriff of Caernarvonshire. In the 17th century John Williams, Archbishop of York combined the hall with the Penrhyn estate. By 1969 it was in use as a barn when it was restored by Cadw and the Penhryn estate.

== Features ==
Many of its original architectural elements are still intact, including the hammerbeam roof of three bays, and unusual for the time, a lateral fireplace.

== In poetry ==
The owners of the hall gave patronage for some of the most prominent poets of the period such as Lewys Daron, Lewys Môn and Guto'r Glyn.
