= Arfon =

Arfon, from the Welsh for Facing Anglesey, refers to the southern shore of the Menai Strait, the part of mainland Wales closest to the island of Anglesey. It may refer to:

== Places ==
- District of Arfon, an administrative subdivision of Gwynedd county (1974–1996)
- Arfon (Senedd constituency) (2007–2026)
- Arfon (UK Parliament constituency) (2010–2024)
- Arfon transmitting station, a radio and television mast near Caernarfon
- Arfon (cantref), an administrative division of the Kingdom of Gwynedd (until 1284)

== People ==
- Arfon Griffiths (born 1941), Welsh footballer
- Arfon Haines Davies (born 1948), Welsh television presenter
- Arfon Jones, Welsh Police and Crime Commissioner for North Wales Police
- Arfon Williams (born 1958), Welsh Anglican priest

== Other ==
- Arfon (hymn tune), a traditional Welsh hymn tune
- HMT Arfon, a WWI Royal Navy minesweeper; now a protected wreck in the English Channel

== See also ==
- Arfor - Welsh economic programme
