= Émile Breton =

French painter and engraver (1831–1902)

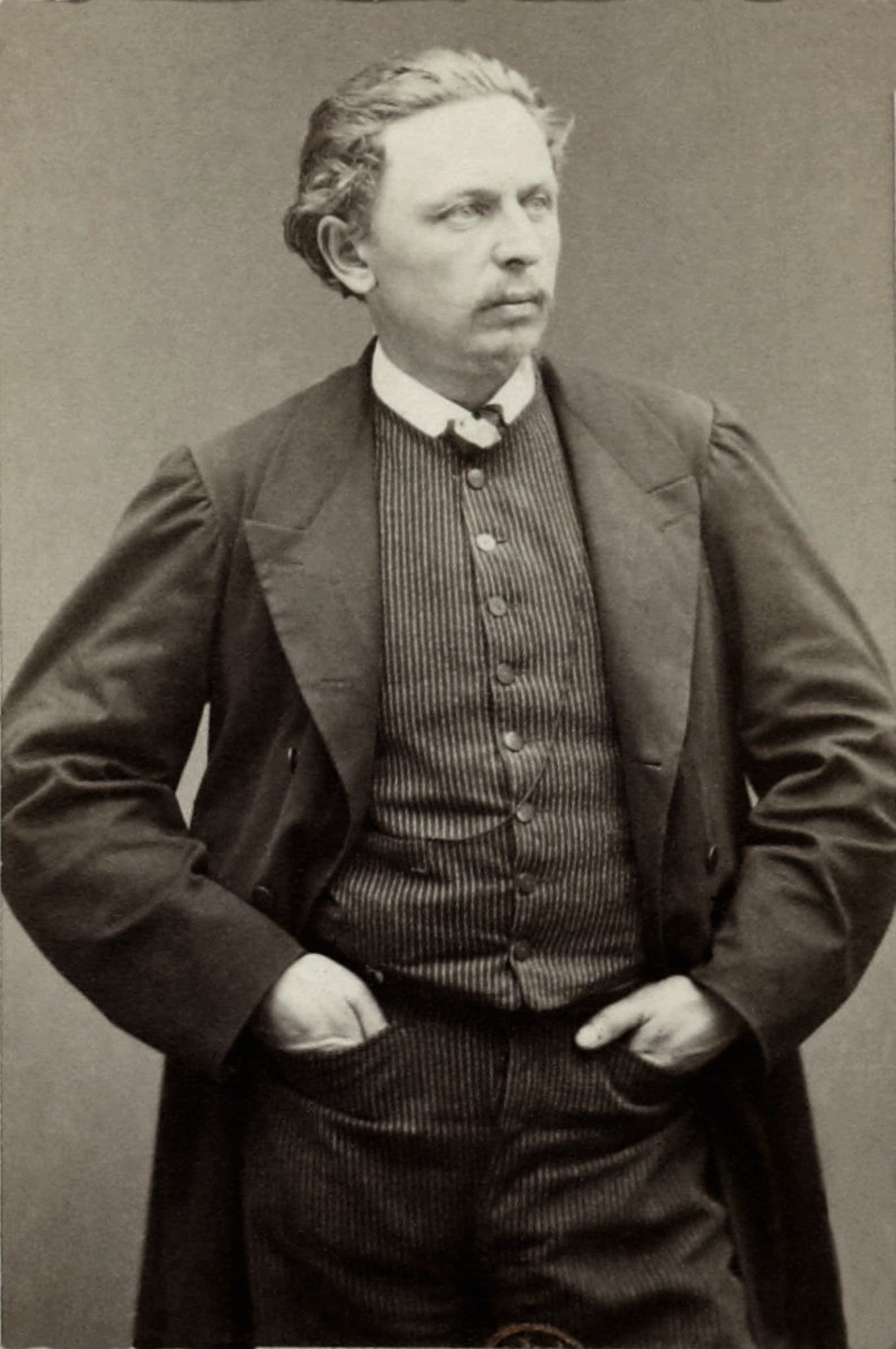
Émile Breton; photograph by Étienne Carjat (1866)

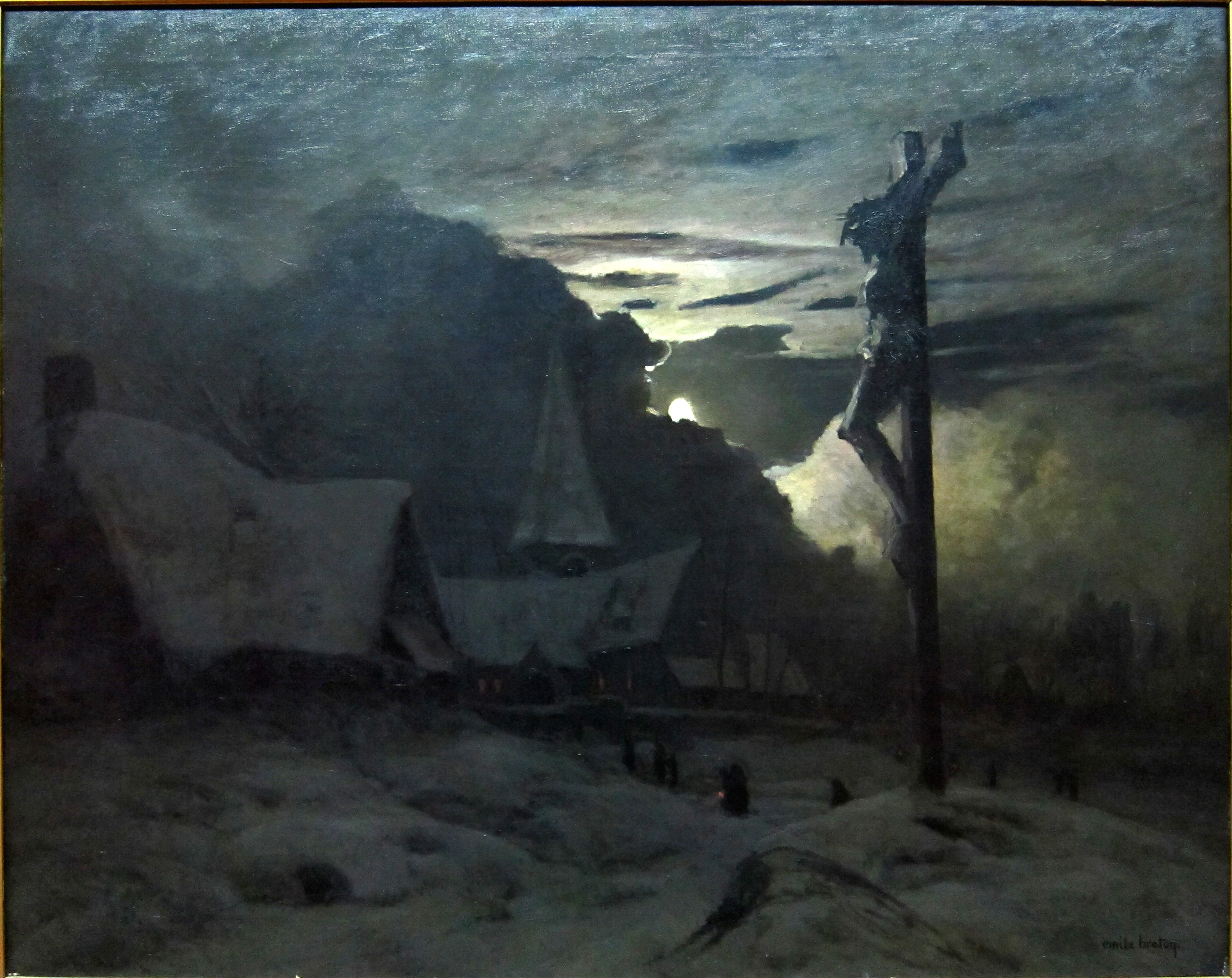
Christmas Night

Émile Adélard Breton (French: [emil adelaʁ bʁətɔ̃]; 8 March 1831, Courrières – 24 November 1902, Courrières) was a French painter and engraver; best known for his moody nocturnal landscapes with figures.

== Biography ==
His older brother, Jules, was also a painter and gave him his first lessons, although he was largely self-taught. His younger brother, Ludovic Breton, was an engineer who was in charge of drilling for the first attempt to build a cross-channel railway tunnel.

His first exhibition was at the Salon in 1861. He later won a medal there three years in a row (1866–1868) and was awarded a first-class medal at the Exposition Universelle (1878). Following that, he was named a Knight in the Legion of Honor. He was given a gold medal at the Exposition Universelle (1889).

During the Franco-Prussian War, he served as a commander of the forces in Pas-de-Calais. He also served as Mayor of Courrières, as did his father, Marie-Louis Breton (1796–1848) and his uncle, Boniface Breton (1829–1891).

He was profoundly affected by the death of his only son, Louis, in 1891 at the age of twenty-nine, which came shortly after the death of his wife. The following year, he decided to abandon painting and sold his entire workshop at auction. Later, he began painting again, but produced very little.

His niece was Virginie Demont-Breton, who was also a well-known painter. Adrien Demont (who married his niece) and Henri Duhem were among his best-known students. A street in Courrières has been named after him.
