= Francis Tattegrain =

French painter

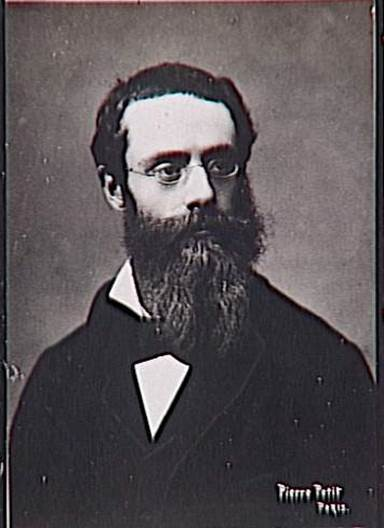
Francis Tattegrain, by Pierre Petit (date unknown)

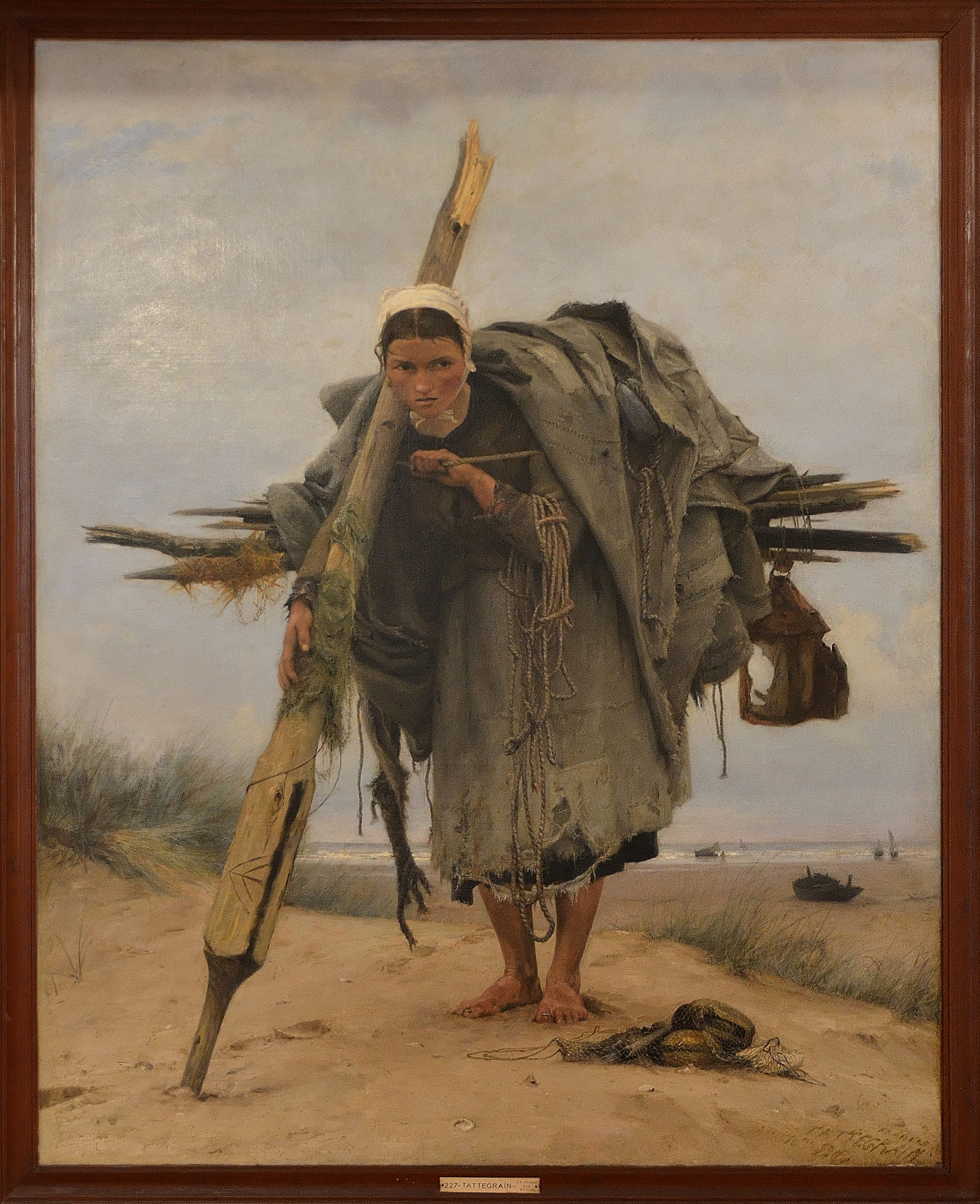
Collecting flotsam and jetsam., c. 1880. oulogne-sur-Mer (Pas-de-Calais) – Le château-musée

Francis Tattegrain (11 October 1852, Péronne - 1 January 1915, Arras) was a French Naturalist painter. He became famous for his works depicting the life of fishermen on the northern French coast. He was a leading exponent of the École de Berck.

== Biography ==
He was born into a family with a long history in the legal profession. His father, President of the Court of Amiens, allowed him to study painting on the promise that he would also study law, which he did, eventually earning a doctorate.

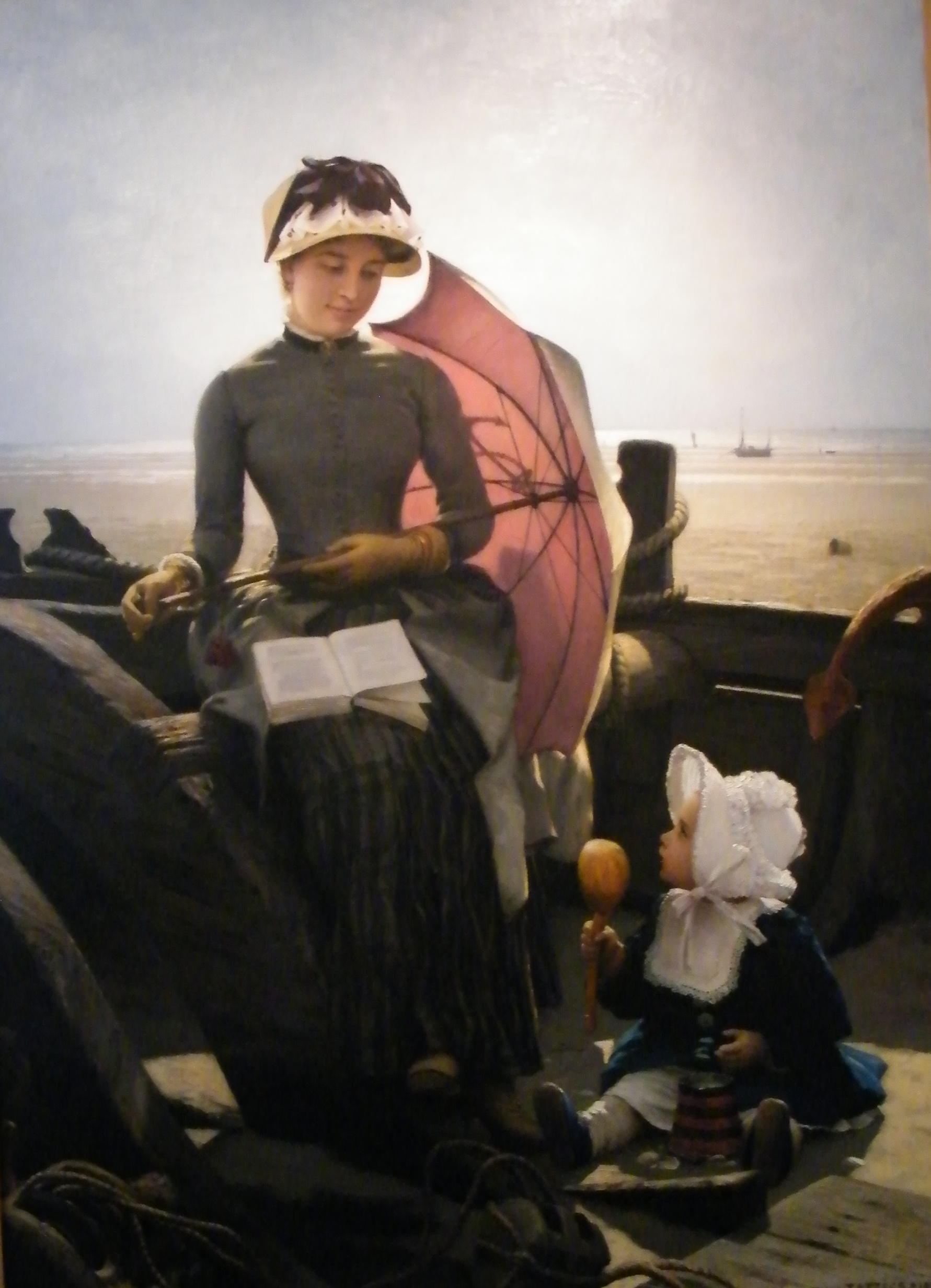
Elegant on the beach. Musée d'Opale-Sud – Berck-sur-Mer

His interest in art originated in 1865, when his parents built a summer cottage in the seaside village of Berck. This happened to be a favorite spot for the painter Ludovic-Napoléon Lepic. Encouraged by Lepic and his older brother Georges Tattegrain, who had become a sculptor, he entered the Académie Julian in 1877, where he studied under Jules Lefebvre and Gustave Boulanger. In 1879, two of his works were presented at the Salon and he continued to exhibit regularly there until 1914.

He later established a studio in Berck and specialized in maritime-related paintings. One of his favorite spots was Authie Bay and he became associated with group of painters known as the "École de Wissant" that gathered at the home of Henri and Marie Duhem. He became a Knight in the Légion d'honneur in 1889 and received numerous public commissions, including works for the awards ceremonies at the Exposition Universelle (1900). Many of his works were published as postcards. He also did illustrations for works by Dumas and Rostand.

According to General Edmond Just Victor Boichut (1864-1941), in his memoirs, Tattegrain died "...la palette à la main..., au champ d’honneur, alors qu’il reconstituait, sous les obus, l’esquisse du beffroi d’Arras". (palette in hand...on the battlefield...under fire, while sketching the belfry in Arras).

Streets were named after him in Amiens, Berck, and Péronne. A square in Boulogne-sur-Mer also bears his name, and a square is Paris is dedicated jointly to him and his brother Georges.

The Musée d'Opale-Sud – Berck-sur-Mer organised an exhibition of the painter's works in 2007 after the Tattegrain family bequeathed more than a hundred paintings and several hundred drawings to the museum. Marguerite Tattegrain (1913-2008) bequeathed 650 drawings, prints, paintings, photographs and part of her grandfather's correspondence to the museum.
