= Adrien Demont =

French painter

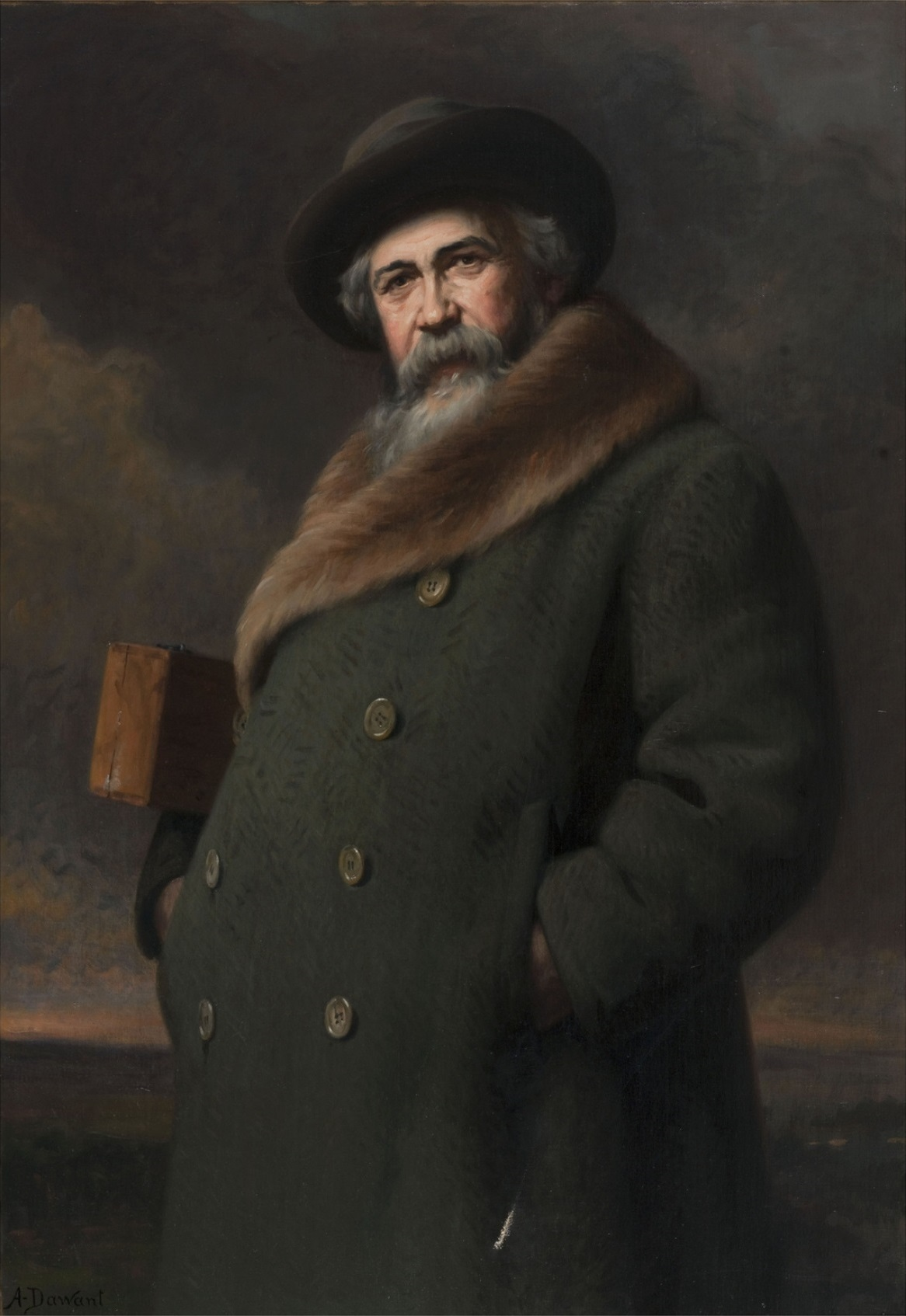
Adrien Demont; portrait by Albert Dawant

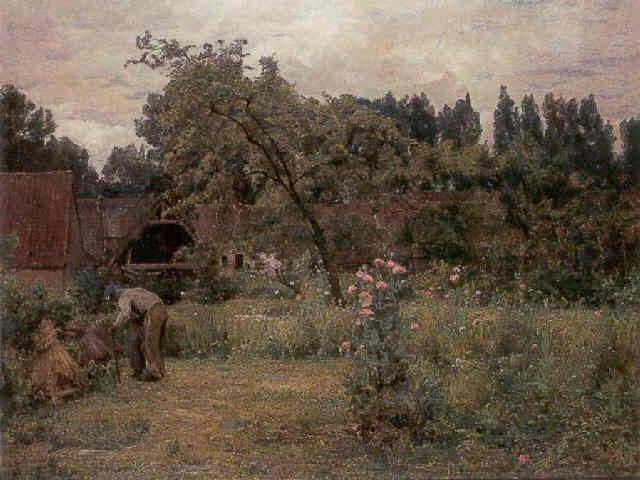
Tending the Garden

Adrien Louis Demont (25 October 1851, Douai - 25 October 1928, Wissant) was a French landscape painter; associated with the artists' colony at Wissant.

== Biography ==
At first, he studied law, but decided to devote himself to painting. His first lessons were in his hometown. Later, he collaborated with Émile Breton. In 1871, he met Jean-Baptiste Corot during his visit to Douai and, shortly after, went to Paris, where he found a position in the workshops of Joseph Blanc.

In 1880, he married the daughter of the painter, Jules Breton, who would herself become a well-known painter under the name Virginie Demont-Breton. Originally, the couple settled in Montgeron but, the following year, they discovered the village of Wissant on the Côte d'Opale. That is where they chose to settle and, in 1891, built a villa in the Egyptian Revival style that they named the "Typhonium".

They soon attracted a circle of students that included Georges Maroniez, Fernand Stiévenart, Henri Duhem and Félix Planquette. They met together frequently until the beginning of World War I. In 1905, Demont was elected a member of "Rosati", a goguette located in Arras. The following year, he was named a Knight in the Legion of Honour.

The year prior to his passing, he published a memoir titled "Souvenances: Promenades à travers ma vie," which depicted everyday life and the artistic milieu in Northern France.

His works are preserved at small museums throughout the region, as well as at the Palais des Beaux-Arts de Lille.
