= SM UC-61 =

1916 Type UC II submarine

Coordinates: 50°53′35″N 1°39′52″E

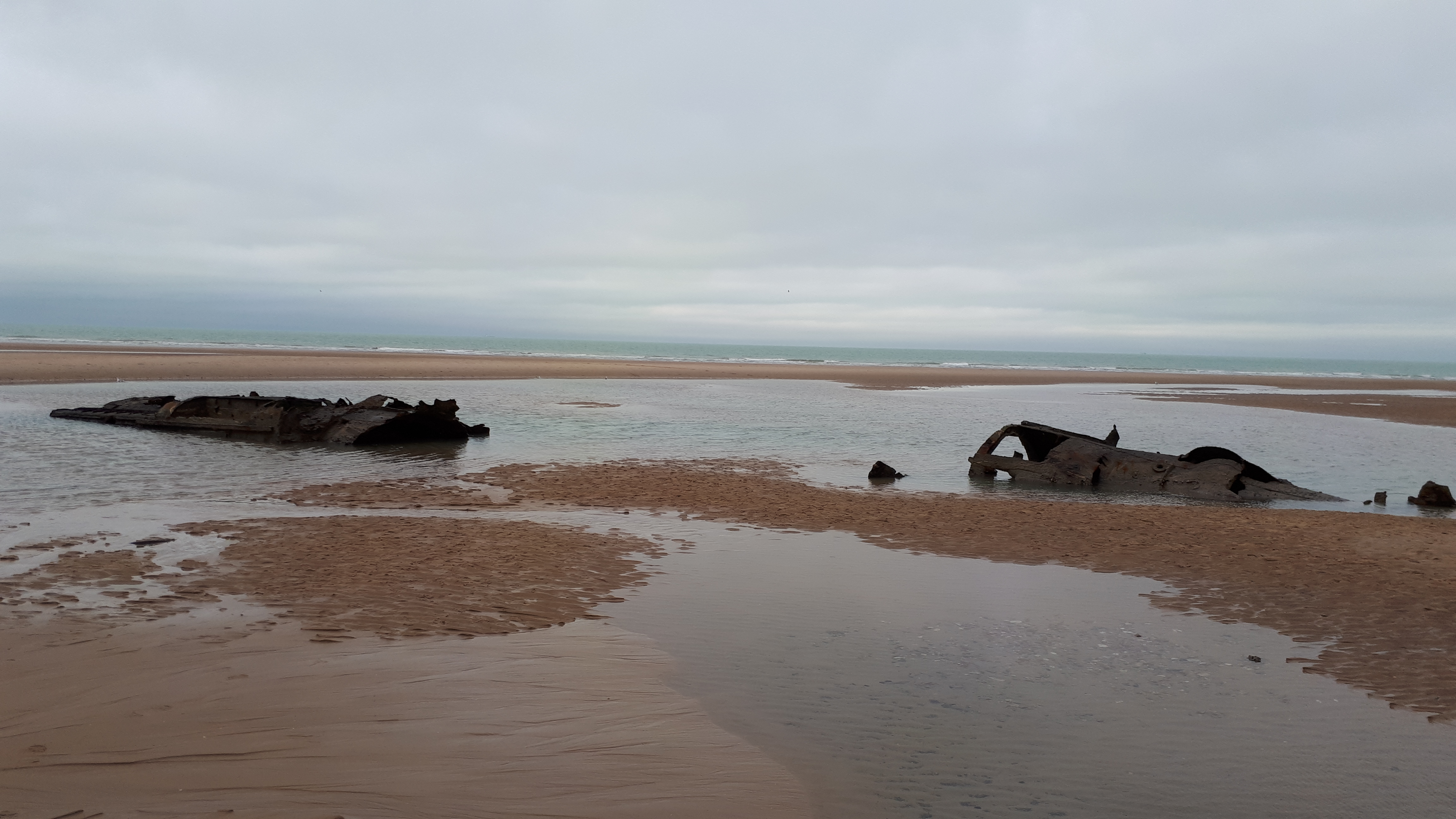
- Remains of the shipwreck of SM UC-61 revealed by low tide at Wissant beach (50°53'34.9"N 1°39'52.0"E), in France (December 2018)

History

German Empire
- Name: UC-61
- Ordered: 12 January 1916
- Builder: AG Weser, Bremen
- Yard number: 259
- Laid down: 3 April 1916
- Launched: 11 November 1916
- Commissioned: 13 December 1916
- Fate: Stranded at Wissant near Calais; flooded and scuttled, 26 July 1917

General characteristics
- Class & type: Type UC II submarine
- Displacement: 422 t (415 long tons), surfaced; 504 t (496 long tons), submerged
- Length: 51.85 m (170 ft 1 in) o/a; 40.40 m (132 ft 7 in) pressure hull
- Beam: 5.22 m (17 ft 2 in) o/a; 3.65 m (12 ft) pressure hull
- Draught: 3.67 m (12 ft 0 in)
- Propulsion: 2× propeller shafts; 2× 6-cylinder, 4-stroke diesel engines, 600 PS (440 kW; 590 shp); 2× electric motors, 620 PS (460 kW; 610 shp)
- Speed: 11.9 knots (22.0 km/h; 13.7 mph), surfaced*7.2 knots (13.3 km/h; 8.3 mph), submerged
- Range: 8,000 nmi (15,000 km; 9,200 mi) at 7 knots (13 km/h; 8.1 mph) surfaced; 59 nmi (109 km; 68 mi) at 4 knots (7.4 km/h; 4.6 mph) submerged
- Test depth: 50 m (160 ft)
- Complement: 26
- Armament: 6× 100 cm (39.4 in) mine tubes; 18× UC 200 mines; 3× 50 cm (19.7 in) torpedo tubes (2 bow/external; one stern); 7× torpedoes; 1× 8.8 cm (3.5 in) Uk L/30 deck gun
- Notes: 30-second diving time

Service record
- Part of: Flandern Flotilla; 27 February – 26 July 1917
- Commanders: Oblt.z.S. / Kptlt. Georg Gerth; 13 December 1916 – 26 July 1917
- Operations: 5 patrols
- Victories: 10 merchant ships sunk (13,594 GRT); 1 warship sunk (7,578 tons); 1 auxiliary warship sunk (227 GRT); 2 merchant ships damaged (3,476 GRT); 1 warship damaged (570 tons)

SM UC-61 was a German Type UC II minelaying submarine or U-boat in the German Imperial Navy (German: Kaiserliche Marine) during World War I. The U-boat was ordered on 12 January 1916, laid down on 3 April 1916, and was launched on 11 November 1916. She was commissioned into the German Imperial Navy on 13 December 1916 as SM UC-61. (Note: "SM" stands for "Seiner Majestät" (English: His Majesty's) and combined with the U for Unterseeboot would be translated as His Majesty's Submarine.) In five patrols UC-61 was credited with sinking or damaging 12 ships, either by torpedo or by mines laid. UC-61 was stranded at Wissant, south of Calais on 26 July 1917 on her way to mine Newhaven. The U-boat's crew flooded and scuttled their ship before surrendering to French authorities. The wreckage silted up but in some years becomes visible at low tide offshore in Wissant. As of 24 January 2019, the submarine had been partially visible since December 2018, and some locals were hopeful that due to shifting winds and tides, the submarine would be visible more often.

== Design ==
A Type UC II submarine, UC-61 had a displacement of 422 tonnes (415 long tons) when at the surface and 504 tonnes (496 long tons) while submerged. She had a length overall of 50.35 m (165 ft 2 in), a beam of 5.22 m (17 ft 2 in), and a draught of 3.67 m (12 ft 0 in). The submarine was powered by two six-cylinder four-stroke diesel engines each producing 300 metric horsepower (220 kW; 300 shp) (a total of 600 metric horsepower (440 kW; 590 shp)), two electric motors producing 620 metric horsepower (460 kW; 610 shp), and two propeller shafts. She had a dive time of 48 seconds and was capable of operating at a depth of 50 metres (160 ft).

The submarine had a maximum surface speed of 11.9 knots (22.0 km/h; 13.7 mph) and a submerged speed of 7.2 knots (13.3 km/h; 8.3 mph). When submerged, she could operate for 59 nautical miles (109 km; 68 mi) at 4 knots (7.4 km/h; 4.6 mph); when surfaced, she could travel 8,000 nautical miles (15,000 km; 9,200 mi) at 7 knots (13 km/h; 8.1 mph). UC-61 was fitted with six 100 centimetres (39 in) mine tubes, eighteen UC 200 mines, three 50 centimetres (20 in) torpedo tubes (one on the stern and two on the bow), seven torpedoes, and one 8.8 cm (3.5 in) Uk L/30 deck gun. Her complement was twenty-six crew members.

== Summary of raiding history ==
Date	Name	Nationality	Tonnage (Note: Merchant ship tonnages are in gross register tons. Military vessels are listed by tons displacement.)	Fate
5 March 1917	Copenhagen	United Kingdom	2,570	Sunk
30 April 1917	HMT Arfon	Royal Navy	227	Sunk
30 April 1917	Gorizia	Uruguay	1,957	Sunk
30 April 1917	Little Mystery	United Kingdom	114	Sunk
3 May 1917	Fils Du Progres	France	25	Sunk
3 May 1917	Giovannina	Kingdom of Italy	3,030	Sunk
5 May 1917	Le Gard	France	1,658	Damaged
8 May 1917	Nelly	France	1,868	Sunk
10 May 1917	Broomhill	United Kingdom	1,392	Sunk
10 May 1917	Minerva	Norway	518	Sunk
27 June 1917	Kléber	French Navy	7,578	Sunk
28 June 1917	Edith Fische	Norway	1,818	Damaged
4 July 1917	Ull	Norway	543	Sunk
6 July 1917	Indutiomare	Belgium	1,577	Sunk
7 July 1917	HMS Ettrick	Royal Navy	570	Damaged
