= Fernand Stiévenart =

French painter (1862–1922)

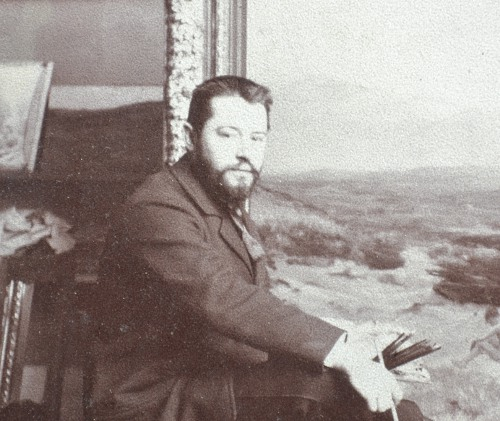
Fernand Stiévenart

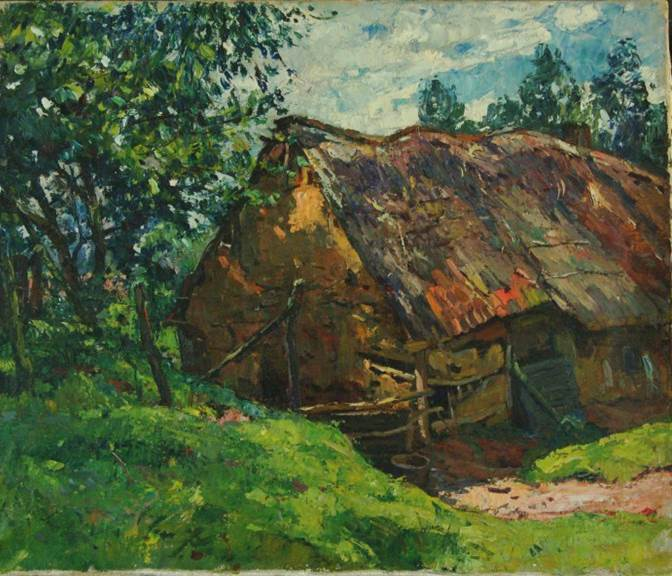
Farmhouse

Fernand Joseph Jules Stiévenart (21 May 1862 in Douai – 22 January 1922 in Uccle) was a French landscape painter; associated with the artists' colony at Wissant.

== Biography ==
After completing his primary education in Douai, he began his artistic studies with a local painter, François-Constant Petit (1819-?). From 1878 to 1880, he studied at the École des Beaux-arts with Gustave Boulanger and others; winning several awards.

In 1888, he exhibited several landscapes at the "Salon des Artistes Français", but it was not until 1893 that he joined the Société des Artistes Français. Shortly after, a terrible shipwreck occurred near Wissant, so he joined with his fellow painters, Adrien Demont, Pierre Carrier-Belleuse and Félix Planquette to create a company called "Flotsam"; devoted to replacing the fishing equipment that had been lost.

He and his wife, the artist Juliette De Reul (1872-1925), daughter of the Belgian novelist Xavier de Reul, lived in Douai until the late 1890s, when they settled in Wissant and opened a studio. Later, their workshop would be occupied by the graphic artist, Paule Crampel (1864-1964), widow of the explorer Paul Crampel.

He was awarded a bronze medal at the Exposition Universelle (1900). Toward the end of his life, he and Juliette moved to Uccle, where they had built a large mansion.
