= HMT Arfon =

Trawler requisitions by the Royal Navy of the United Kingdom

HMT Arfon was a trawler requisitioned by the Royal Navy of the United Kingdom at the beginning of the First World War. She sank after striking a mine on 30 April 1917 south of St Alban's Head, Dorset, England. The site was designated under the Protection of Wrecks Act on 17 August 2016. The wreck is a Protected Wreck managed by Historic England.

== History ==
Arfon was built in 1908 in Goole, East Riding of Yorkshire for the Peter Steam Trawling Company of Milford Haven, South Wales. She was a 227-ton trawler. In 1914 Arfon was requisitioned by the Royal Navy for war duties and was armed and converted to a mine-sweeper.

In 1917 she struck a mine and sunk in two minutes, ten lives were lost, and only three members of the crew survived having been blown off the vessel upon explosion of the mine. The loss of the Arfon was credited to UC-61.

== The wreck ==
The wreck of Arfon is well preserved on the seabed, it sits upright. The bow section was destroyed when the mine exploded, the stern and amidships sections remain.

== Discovery and investigation ==
The wreck was identified in 2014 after having previously been misidentified on the seabed elsewhere in 1998.
