= Arfon (hymn tune) =

Type of traditional Welsh hymn

Arfon is a traditional Welsh hymn tune which exists with major and minor variants.

== General information ==
The hymn tune Arfon originates as a Welsh folk tune of six lines (with the second couplet [a duplicate of the first] being omitted), but it was adapted into a French hymn tune as the eight-line tune known today. In its major form, it can be used as an alternative tune for the Ascensiontide hymn Hail, Thou once despised Jesus. In its minor form, it is the tune for the Passiontide hymn Man of sorrows, wrapt in grief by Matthew Bridges.
