= Virginie Demont-Breton =

French painter

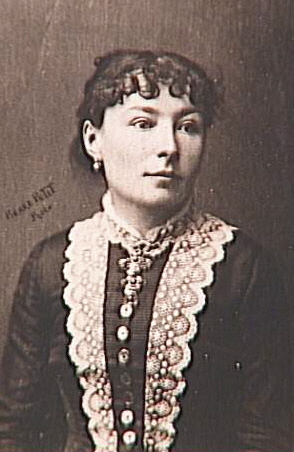
- Virginie Demont-Breton c.1900, Photograph by Pierre Petit
- Born: Virginie Élodie Marie Thérèse Breton; 26 July 1859; Courrières, France
- Died: 10 January 1935 (aged 75); Paris, France
- Known for: Painting
- Spouse: Adrien Demont (m. 1880)

Virginie Élodie Marie Thérèse Demont-Breton (French: [viʁʒini dəmɔ̃ bʁətɔ̃]; 26 July 1859, Courrières – 10 January 1935, Paris) was a French painter.

== Biography ==
Virginie was the daughter of Jules Breton (1827–1906) and the niece of Émile Breton, both renowned painters. Her mother, Élodie de Vigne, a painter and model, was herself the daughter of the Flemish painter and medievalist Félix de Vigne . Through her father she was introduced to other painters, the most influential being Rosa Bonheur who became a role-model and mentor to Virginie. She married the painter Adrien Demont in 1880.

Her artistic career got off to an early start due to her having family ties with painters, and she finished her first painting at the young age of fourteen. By the age of twenty, she was exhibiting at the Salon where she received an Honorable Mentions and, four years later, she won a gold medal at the Amsterdam Exposition.

In 1890, she and her husband moved to Wissant, a small village on the Côte d'Opale, where they built a villa designed by the Belgian architect Edmond De Vigne. Called the "Typhonium", it is in Neo-Egyptian style and has been a Historical Monument since 1985.

Demont-Breton exhibited her work at the Palace of Fine Arts, the Children's Building, and The Woman's Building at the 1893 World's Columbian Exposition in Chicago, Illinois.

She served as President of the Union of Women Painters and Sculptors from 1895 to 1901, though she resigned for a short period of time in 1892, due to a disagreement between her and the Union's community over what she saw as their unfair methods of voting. She worked with Hélène Bertaux in her effort to open the École des Beaux-Arts to women students; a goal which was achieved in 1897. Thanks to her success in this endeavor, female artists were given the opportunity to not only be present in academic settings, but also the ability to use artistic tools previously not available to them, such as nude models. She was the second woman to be decorated with the Légion d'honneur – the first woman being her mentor Rosa Bonheur – in 1894, and became an Officer in 1914. The previous year, she had been elected to the Royal Academy of Fine Arts (Antwerp) in 1913

Originally, she painted portraits and historical scenes but, after moving to Wissant, switched to painting the fishermen and their families in a Realistic style. In 1889, Vincent van Gogh painted his own version of one of her works, L’Homme Est en Mer (Her Man is Out to Sea). She also painted scenes of motherhood and children that depict mothers in strong and powerful imagery within nature.

== Gallery ==
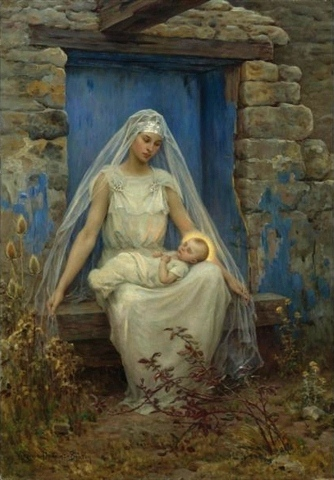
Alma mater

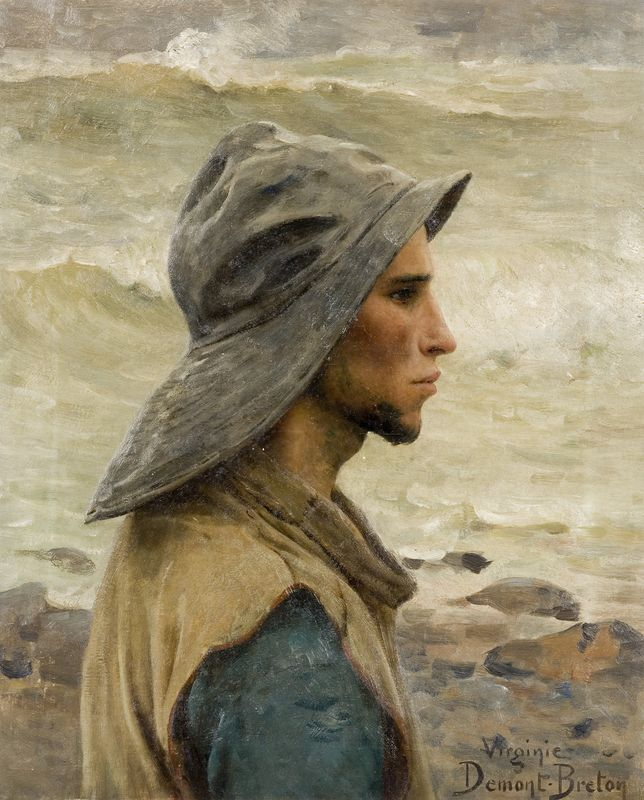
Young fisherman

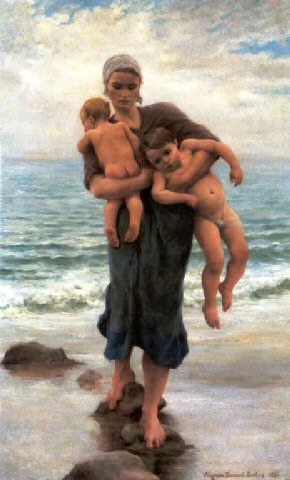
Fisherman's wife

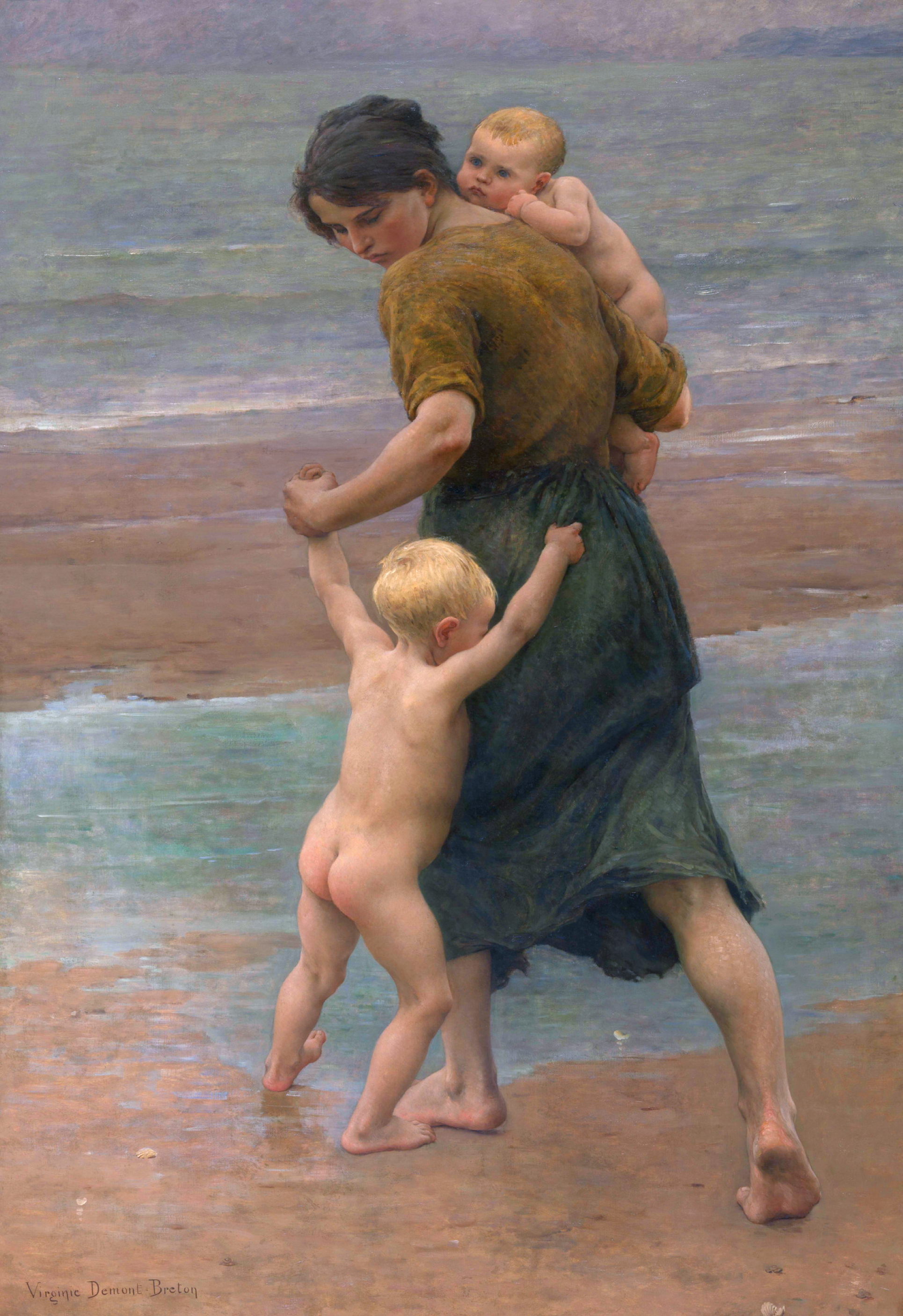
Into the water

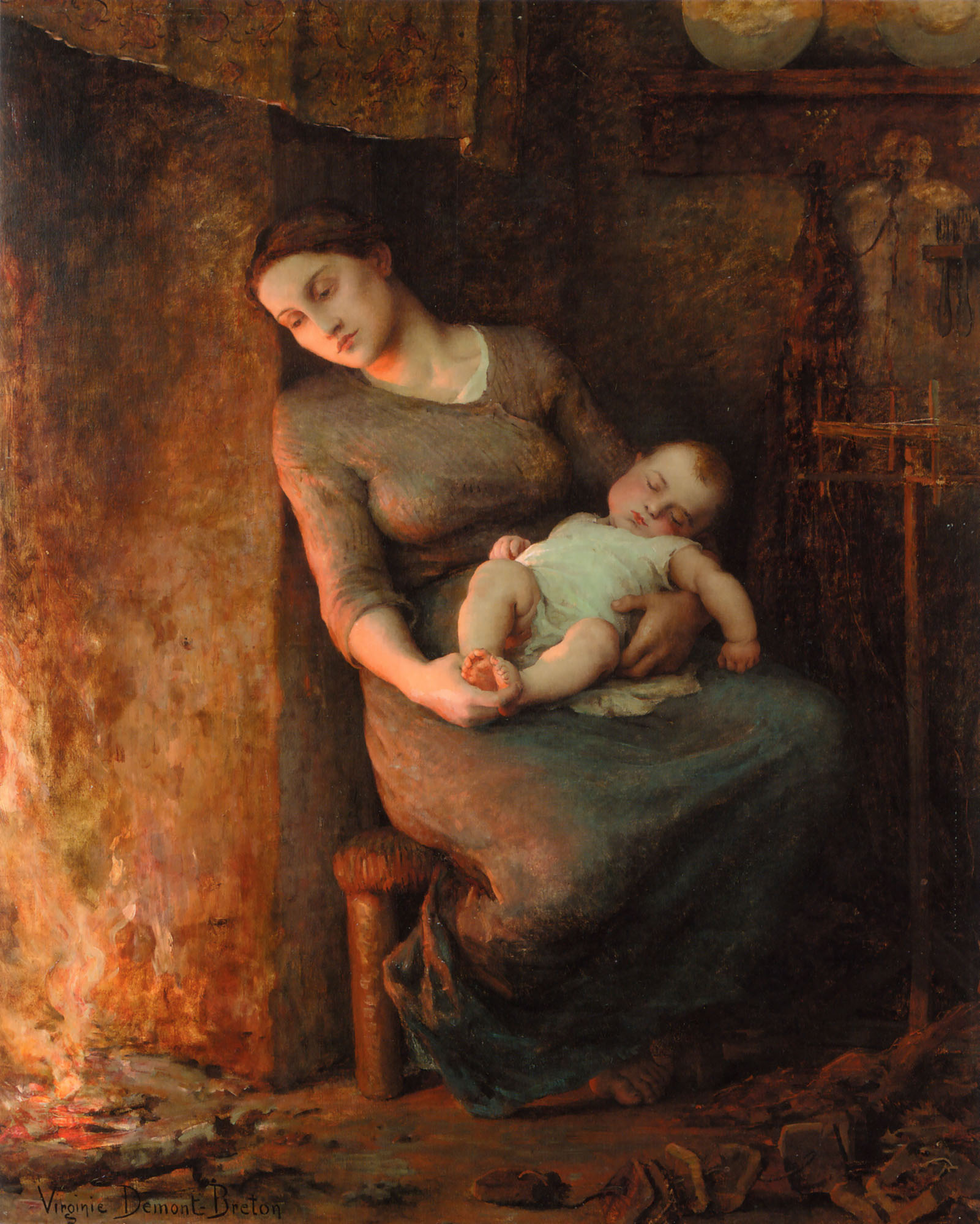
Her Man is at Sea by Virginie Demont-Breton

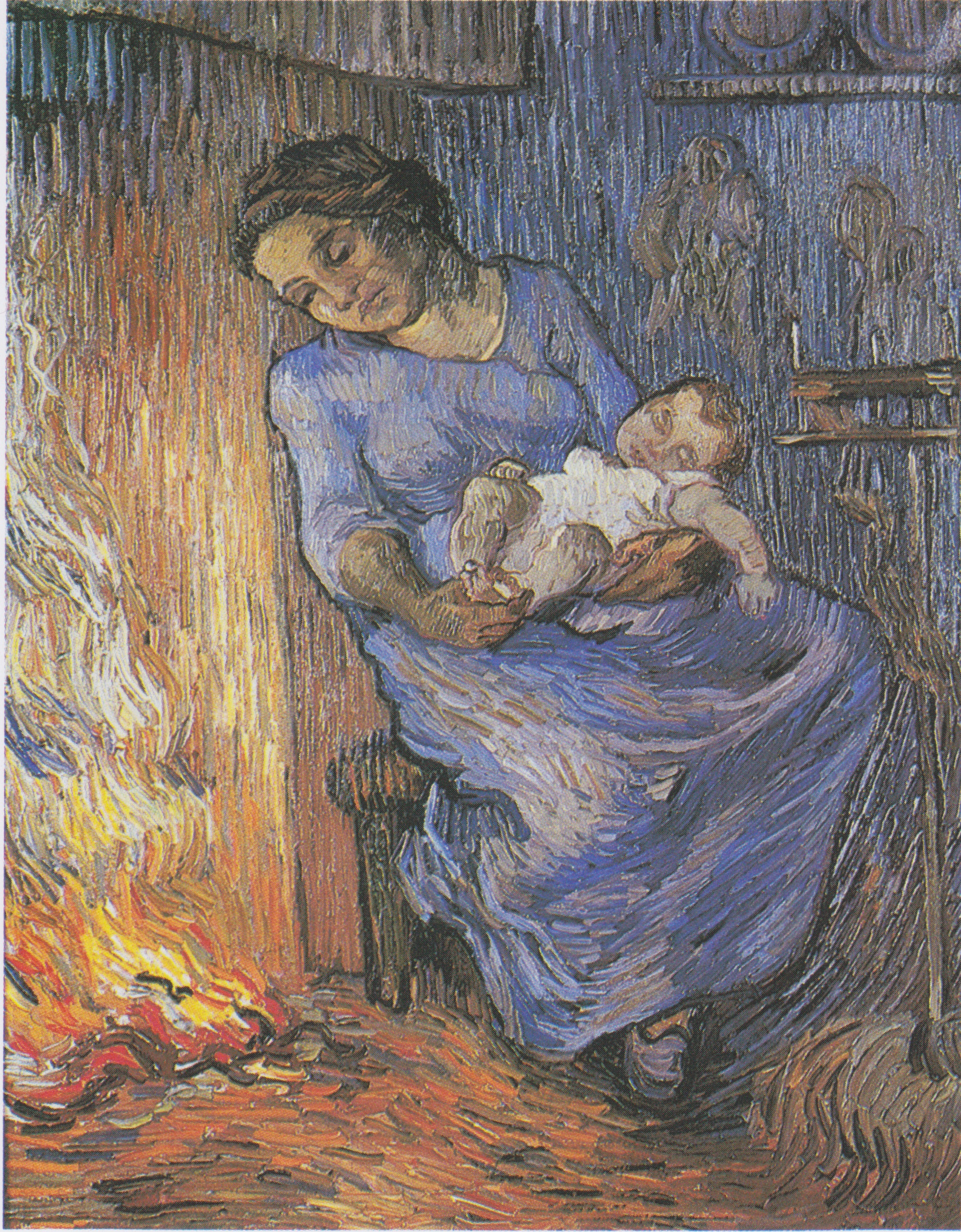
Her Man is at Sea (after Demont-Breton), by Vincent van Gogh, 1889, Private collection

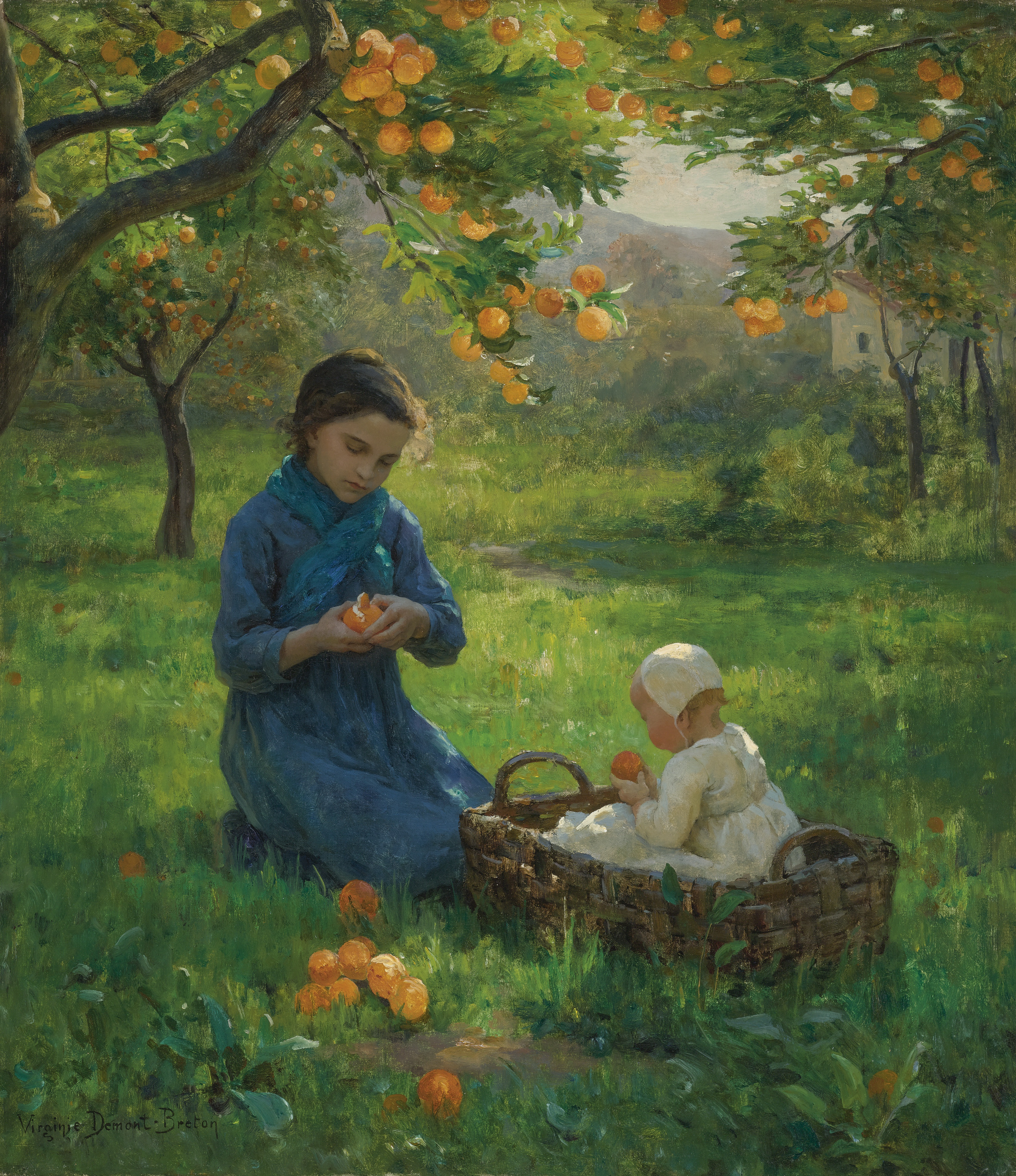
Under the orange tree

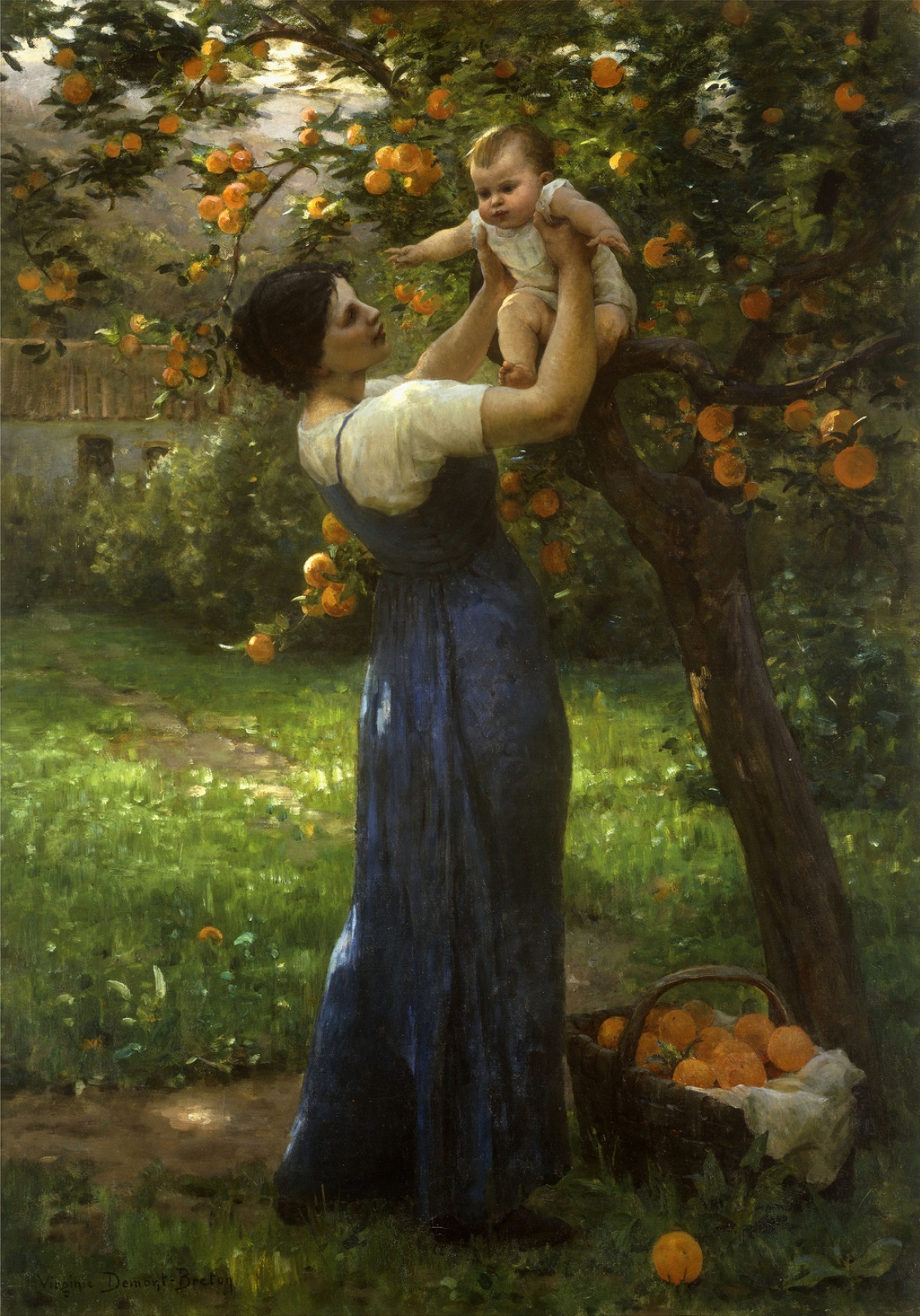
Mother and child in an orange grove

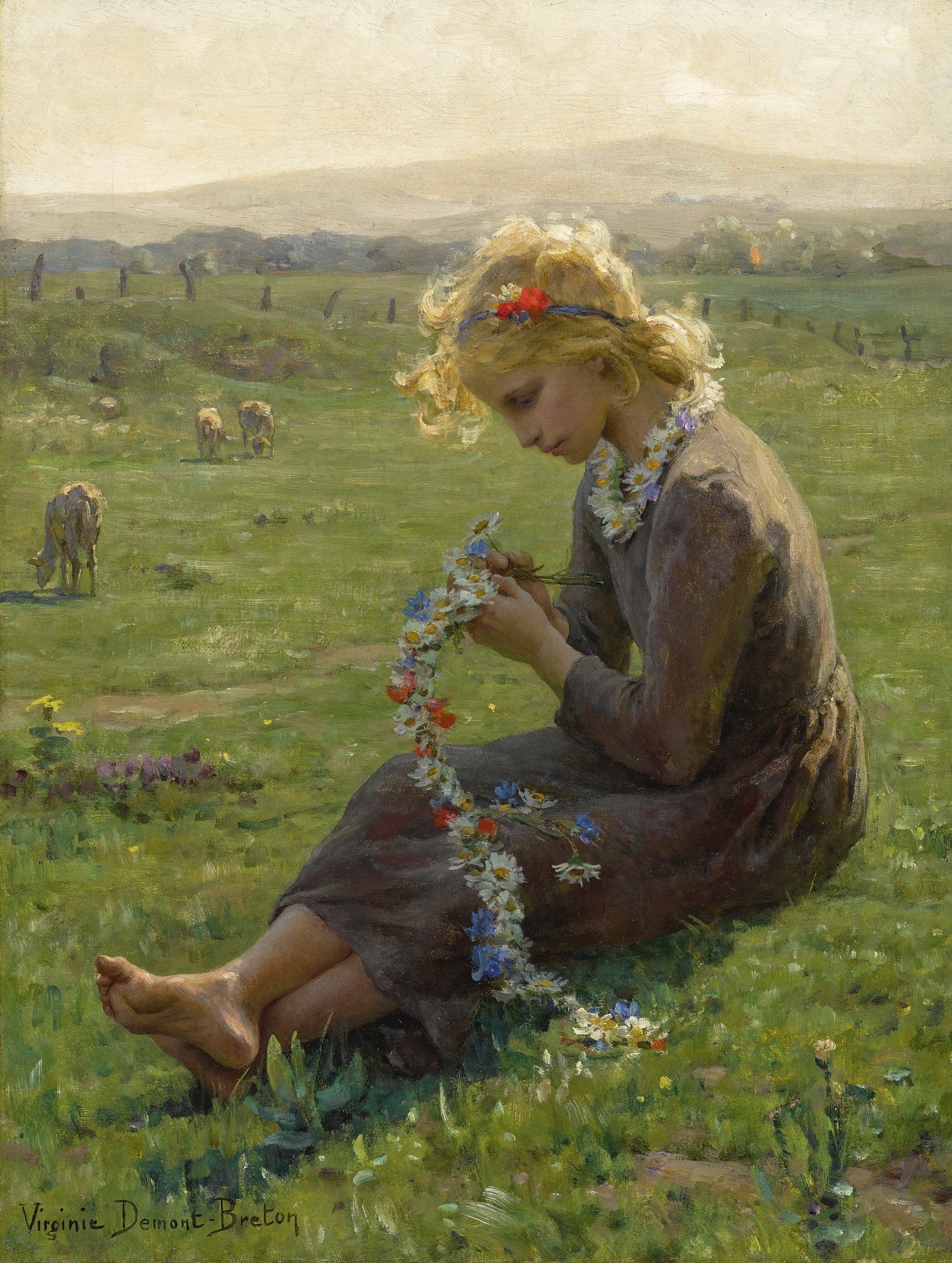
Girl with a garland of wild flowers

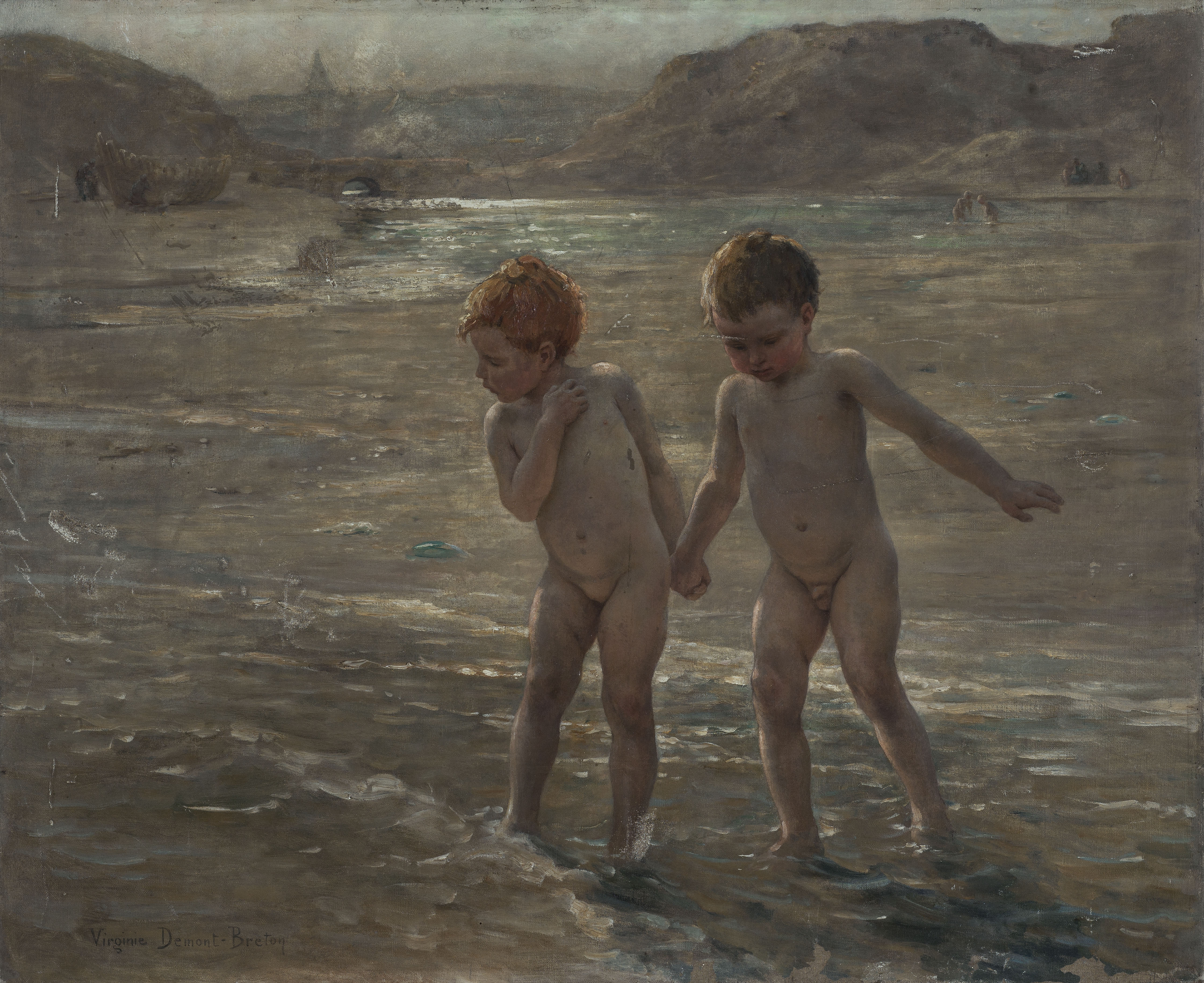
Under the pure air

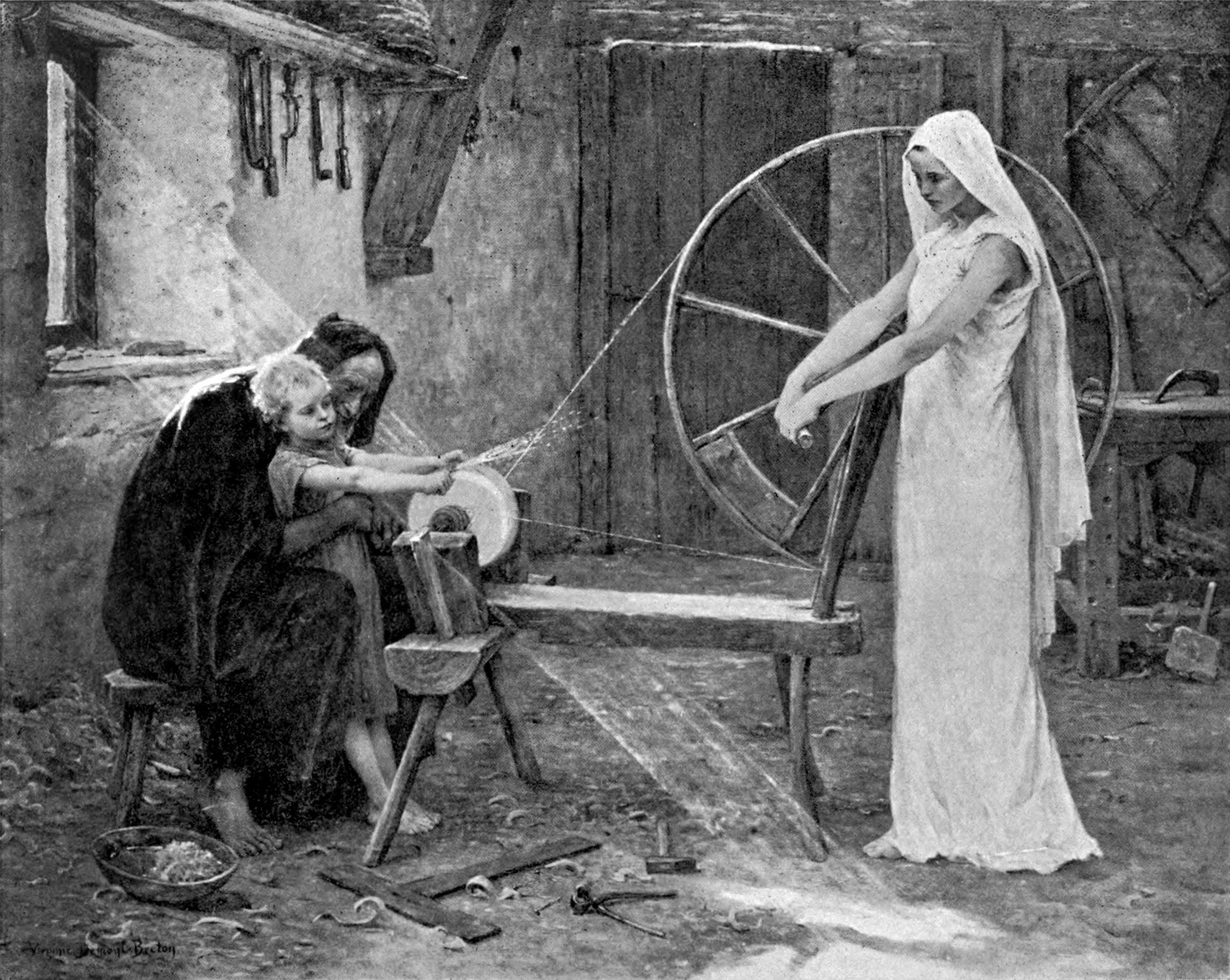
The divine apprentice

== Writings ==
- Tendresses dans la tourmente. 1914-1919 poésies, Alphonse Lemerre, Paris 1920
- Les maisons que j'ai connues. Plon-Nourrit, Paris 1926
