= Wissant =

Wissant Witzand
- Commune
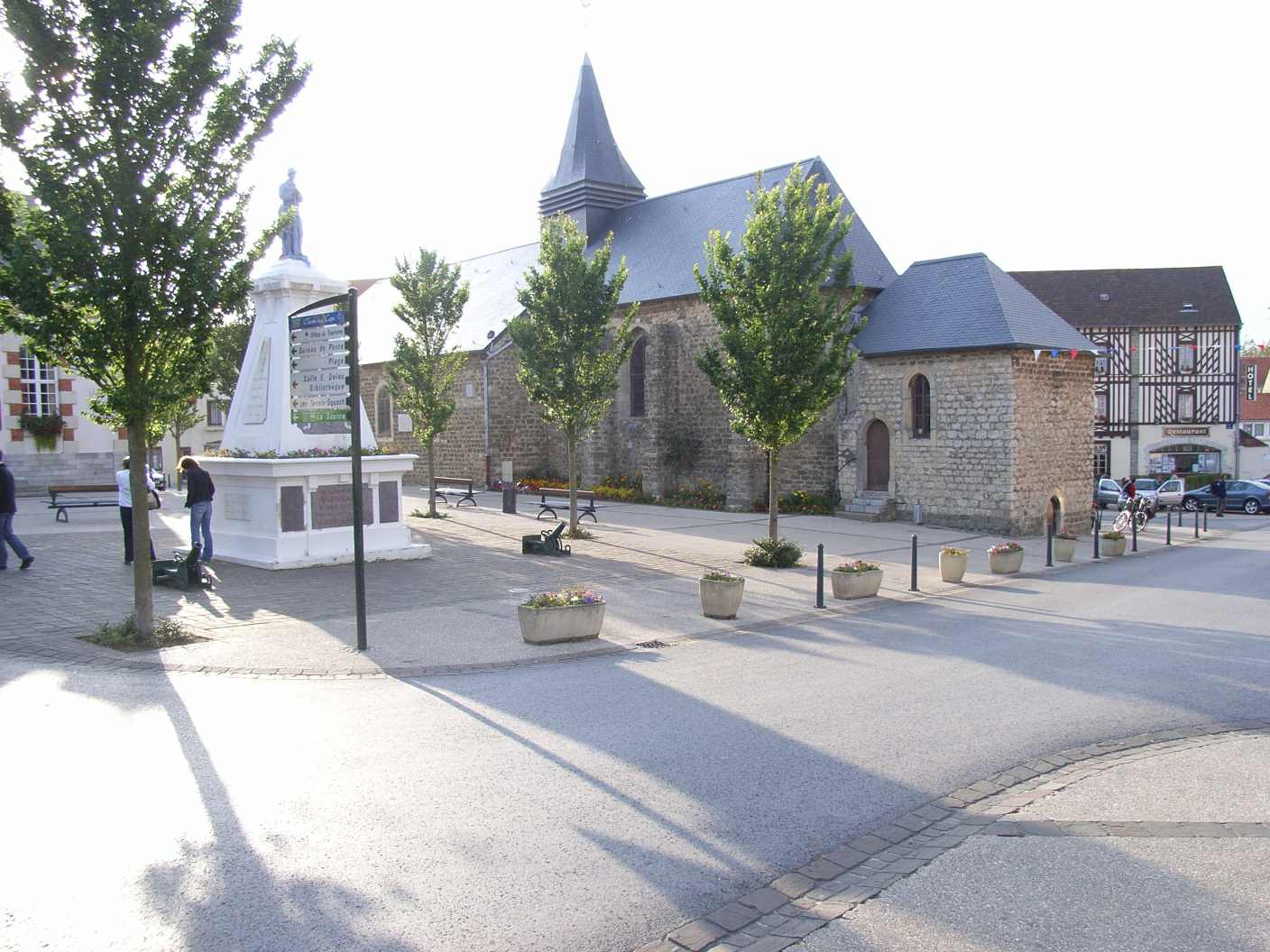
- The centre of Wissant

- Coat of arms
- Location of Wissant
- Location within France Location within Hauts-de-France
- Coordinates: 50°53′10″N 1°39′49″E
- Country: France
- Region: Hauts-de-France
- Department: Pas-de-Calais
- Arrondissement: Boulogne-sur-Mer
- Canton: Desvres
- Intercommunality: Terre des Deux Caps

Government
  - Mayor (2024–2026): Pierre-Edouard Davies
- Area^{1}: 12.79 km^{2} (4.94 sq mi)
- Elevation: 17 m (56 ft)
- Highest elevation: 158 m (518 ft)
- Lowest elevation: 0 m (0 ft)
- Population (2023): 835
  - Density: 65.3/km^{2} (169/sq mi)
- Time zone: UTC+01:00 (CET)
  - Summer (DST): UTC+02:00 (CEST)
- INSEE/Postal code: 62899 /62179
- ^{1} French Land Register data, which excludes lakes, ponds, glaciers > 1 km^{2} (0.386 sq mi or 247 acres) and river estuaries.

Wissant (French pronunciation: [ɥisɑ̃]; from Dutch: Witzand, "white sand") is a seaside commune in the Pas-de-Calais department in the Hauts-de-France region of France approximately 18 kilometres (11 mi) north of Boulogne, 16 kilometres (9.9 mi) west-southwest of Calais on the English Channel coast.

== History ==
Located at the eastern end of a lagoon formed by a storm-breach of the coastal dunes, probably in the mid-10th century, Wissant has been a fishing village for a millennium: along with Audresselles it is the last fishing village in France to use a traditional method of fishing using a wooden boat called a flobart and was in the Middle Ages a major port for embarkation for England: In a mid-11th century Life of St. Vulganius, Wissant was specified, probably anachronistically, as the natural disembarkation point for the early eighth-century Celtic saint in his evangelizing travels. Wissant was the embarkation port of Robert de Beaumont, 3rd Earl of Leicester, for his ill-fated invasion of England in 1173, with an army of 3000 Flemings. Henry III of England was stranded at Wissant for lack of cash. According to Matthew Paris (mid-13th century) its naucleri habitually interfered with English fishing fleets.

From the 7th to the 14th century, the local language was the West Franconian dialect called Old Dutch and the village was called Witsant and reckoned part of Flanders.

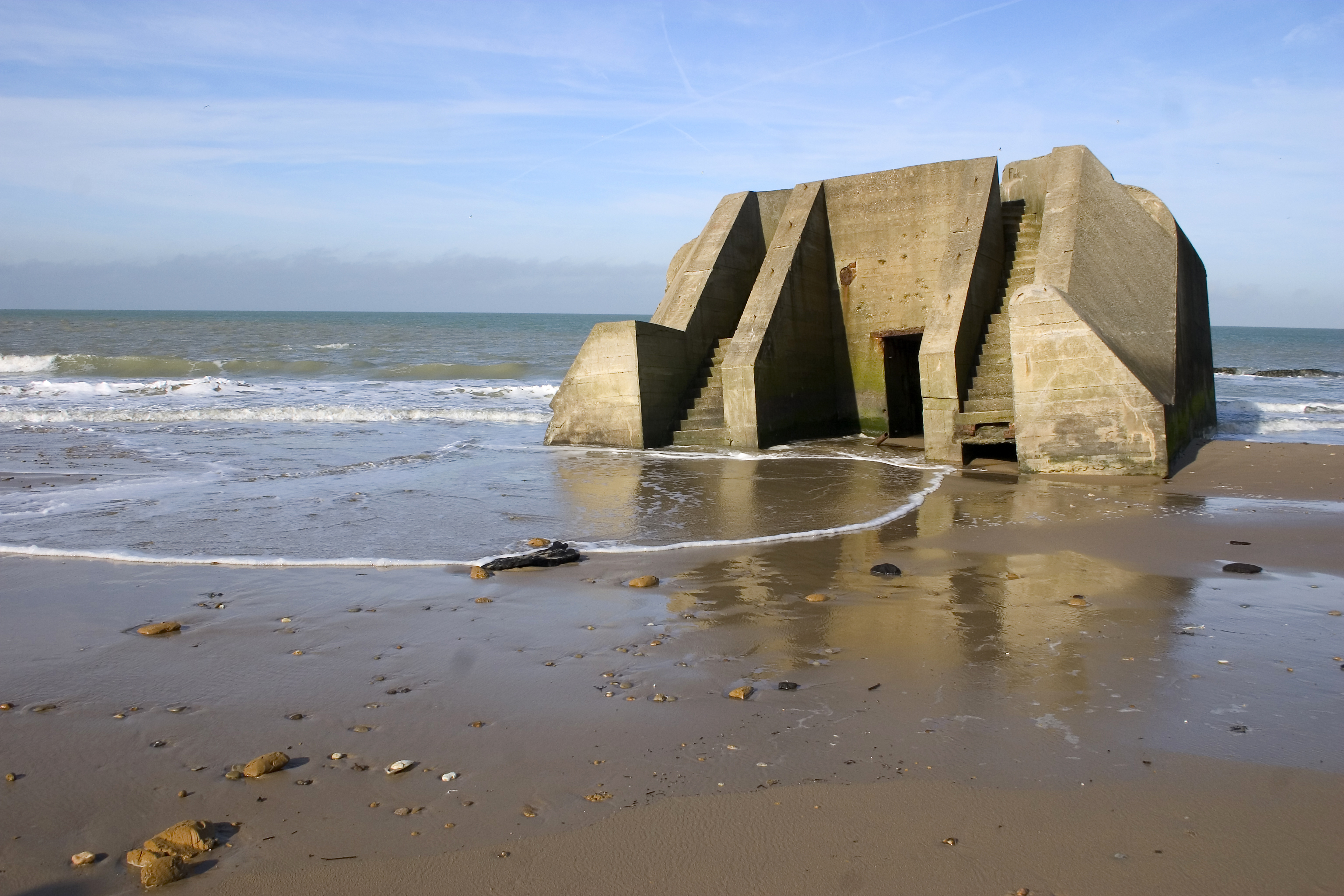
A World War II concrete blockhouse at Wissant

Shifting coastal sands silted up the harbour, at the same time that Calais was rising in importance as a port towards the end of the 12th century. At the end of the 19th century, the coastal dunes of Wissant began to be covered with seaside villas. During the 20th century, an entrepreneur, M. Létendart from Calais, extracted sand and gravel from the dunes to the west of Wissant, in the bed of the ancient lagoon. The huge excavations now form lakes and a nature reserve. At the time of the exploitation of these gravel pits, the bones of a complete mammoth with its tusks were discovered by four workers.

In July 1909 Wissant stood at the centre of worldwide focus. Three contenders for the £1,000 Northcliffe prize offered by the Daily Mail for the first heavier-than-air craft to cross the English Channel were camped along the coast between Calais and Wissant. The Franco-Russian Comte Charles de Lambert who had two Wright Flyers (Nos. 2 and 18) and was camped at Wissant.. While practising over the dunes he crashed heavily and cancelled his plans. Louis Blériot won the prize and worldwide fame, from his camp at Calais.

Today, because of the frequent and usually favourable winds and the proximity of the TGV railway station and the Eurostar trains to Fréthun, Parisians call Wissant the "Mecca” of surfing.

== Population ==
The inhabitants are called Wissantais in French.

Historical population
Year	Pop.	±% p.a.
1968	1,058	—
1975	1,140	+1.07%
1982	1,247	+1.29%
1990	1,303	+0.55%
1999	1,186	−1.04%
2007	1,046	−1.56%
2012	1,033	−0.25%
2017	939	−1.89%
2023	835	−1.94%
Source: INSEE

== Places of interest ==
- Le Typhonium, a villa built in Egyptian style for the artist Adrien Demont and his wife Virginie Demont-Breton.
- SM UC-61, the wreck of a German WWI submarine.

== See also ==
- Communes of the Pas-de-Calais department
