= Marmottan =

Marmottan is a surname. Notable people with the surname include:

- Anémone Marmottan (b. 1988), French alpine skier
- Paul Marmottan (1856–1932), French art historian, collector and patron
  - Bibliothèque Marmottan, in Paris, France
  - Musée Marmottan Monet, in Paris, France

== See also ==
- Louis-Augustin Marmottin (1875–1960), French Catholic bishop
