= Louis Leroy =

French painter and journalist (1812–1885)

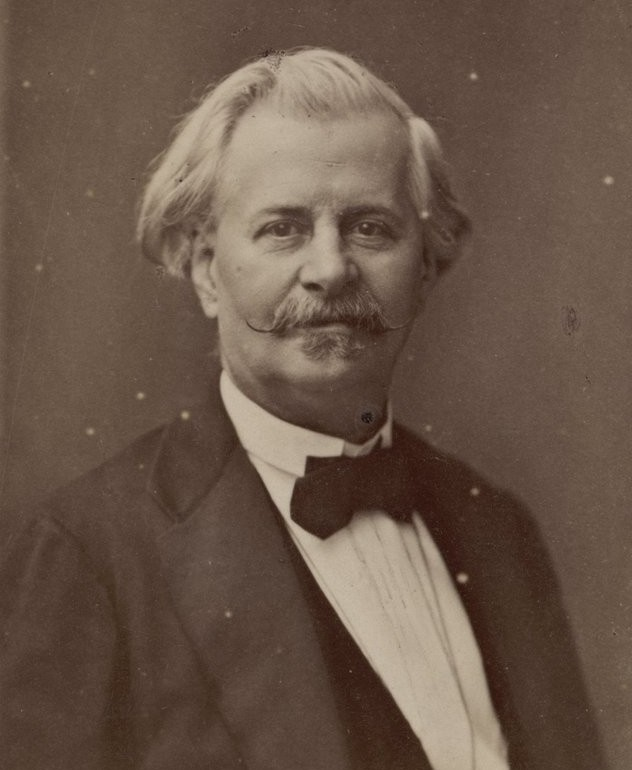
- Born: 11 July 1812
- Died: 30 July 1885 (aged 73); France
- Citizenship: French
- Occupations: Art critic, journalist, playwright, engraver, and painter
- Writing career
- Notable work: Coining the term "Impressionism"

Louis Leroy (French pronunciation: [lwi ləʁwa]; 1812–1885) was a French 19th-century printmaker, painter, and playwright.

== Biography ==
He is remembered as the journalist and art critic for the French satirical newspaper Le Charivari, who coined the term "impressionists" to satirise the artists now known by the word.

Leroy's review was printed in Le Charivari on 25 April 1874 with the title The Exhibition of the Impressionists. The term was taken from Claude Monet's painting Impression: soleil levant. Leroy's article took the form of a dialogue between two skeptical viewers of the work:

"Impression I was certain of it. I was just telling myself that, since I was impressed, there had to be some impression in it — and what freedom, what ease of workmanship! A preliminary drawing for a wallpaper pattern is more finished than this seascape."

The show (Exposition des Impressionnistes) was held in the salon of the photographer Nadar and organized by the Société anonyme des peintres, sculpteurs et graveurs (Anonymous society of painters, sculptors and engravers), composed of Camille Pissarro, Claude Monet, Alfred Sisley, Edgar Degas, Pierre-Auguste Renoir, Paul Cézanne, Armand Guillaumin, and Berthe Morisot.

The term was subsequently adopted by the artists themselves and has now become the name of one of the most influential art movements in history.
