= Type 91 torpedo =

Aerial torpedo of the Imperial Japanese Navy

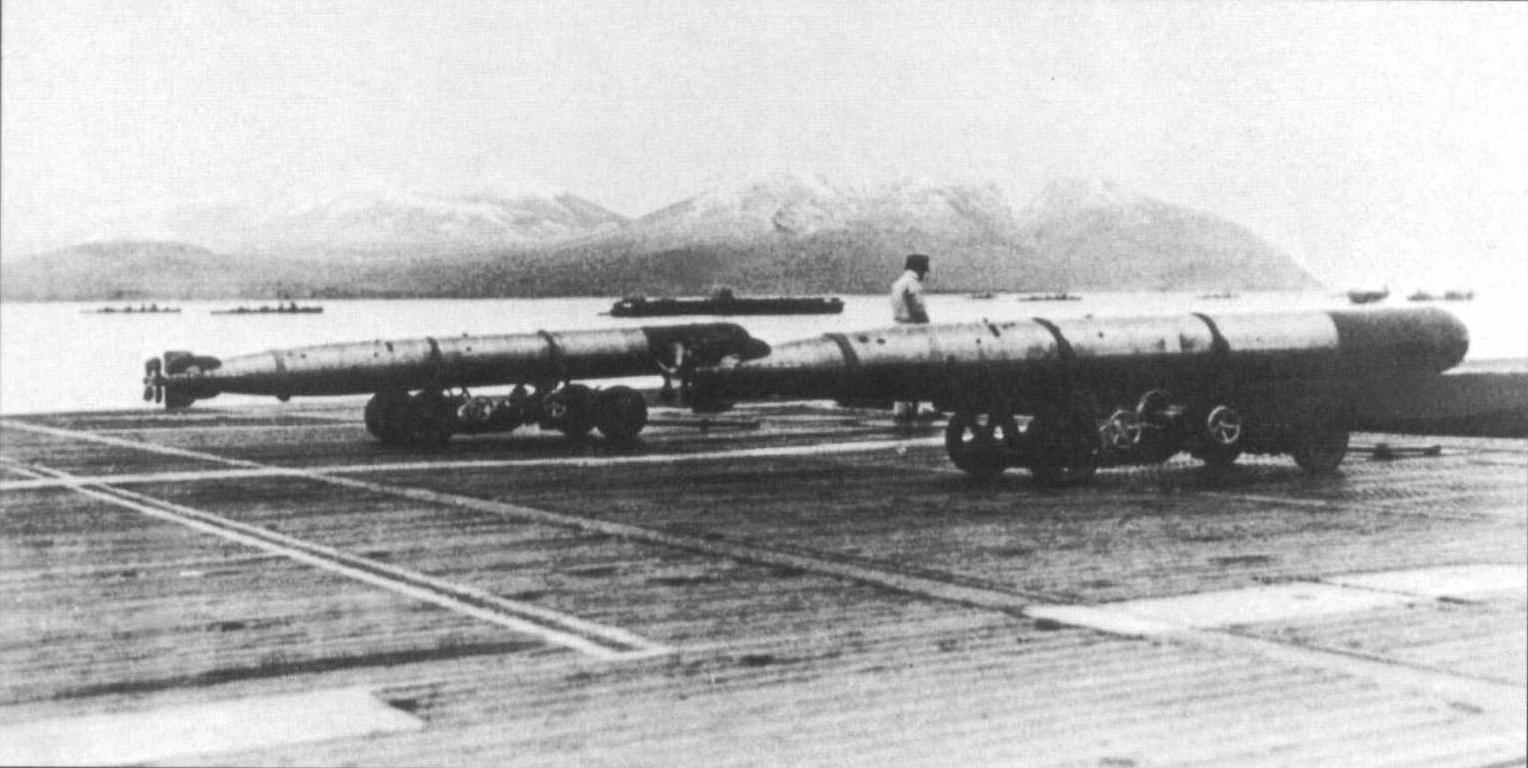
- Type 91 torpedoes aboard an aircraft carrier.
- Type: Aerial torpedo
- Place of origin: Empire of Japan

Service history
- In service: 1931–1945
- Used by: Japanese Navy
- Wars: World War II

Production history
- Designer: Rear Admiral Seiji Naruse and his team
- Designed: 1930–1945
- Unit cost: 20,000 yen (in 1941)

Specifications
- Mass: 848 kg (1,870 lb)
- Length: 5.270 m (17.29 ft)
- Diameter: 45 cm (18 in)
- Wingspan: 69 cm (27 in) in the air, 66 cm (26 in) in the water
- Maximum firing range: 2,000 m (2,200 yd)
- Warhead weight: 323.6 kg (713 lb) high explosive, 235 kg (518 lb) for warhead rev.3
- Engine: Wet-heater type, 8-cylinder radial engine 150 kW (200 hp)
- Maximum speed: 78 km/h (42 kn)
- Steering system: Gyrocompass-guided vertical-rudder control system, gyroscope-guided anti-rolling controller system
- Launch platform: Single-engine carrier-based attack aircraft, twin-engine land-based attack aircraft

The Type 91 was an aerial torpedo of the Imperial Japanese Navy. It was in service from 1931 to 1945. It was used in naval battles in World War II and was specially developed for attacks on ships in shallow harbours.

The Type 91 aerial torpedo had two unique characteristics. Firstly, it used wooden stabilizers attached to the tail fins which were shed upon water entry. Secondly, it engaged an angular acceleration control system to control rolling movements, which was very advanced for its time. This system made it possible to release the Type 91 not only at a cruising speed of 330 km/h (180 kn) at an altitude of 20 m (66 ft), but also in a power-glide torpedo-bombing run at the maximum speed of the Nakajima B5N 'Kate', 378 km/h (204 kn)

The Type 91 torpedo was an 18 in (450 mm) diameter torpedo, similar in size to other nations. There were five models put into service, with high-explosive warheads weighing from 213.5 to 526.0 kg (471 to 1,160 lb) with effective ranges from 1,500 to 2,000 m (1,600 to 2,200 yd) at 42 kn (78 km/h).

Since the Type 91 torpedo was the only practical aerial torpedo of the Imperial Japanese Navy, it was simply known as the Koku Gyorai or "aerial torpedo". Surface warships and submarines used other types of torpedoes, namely the Type 93 and Type 95 respectively, while the Type 97 torpedo was designed for use by midget submarines.

== Specifications ==
The torpedo measured 5.5 m (18 ft) in length, with a diameter of 450 mm (18 in), and weighed 835 kg (1,841 lb), with an explosive charge of 205 kg (452 lb). It had a range of 2,000 m (2,200 yd) and a speed of 78 km/h (42 kn). A slightly-modified variant was used to sink HMS Prince of Wales and HMS Repulse, launched from Mitsubishi G4M "Betty" bombers in an action in the South China Sea three days after Pearl Harbor on 10 December 1941.

== Type 91 history ==
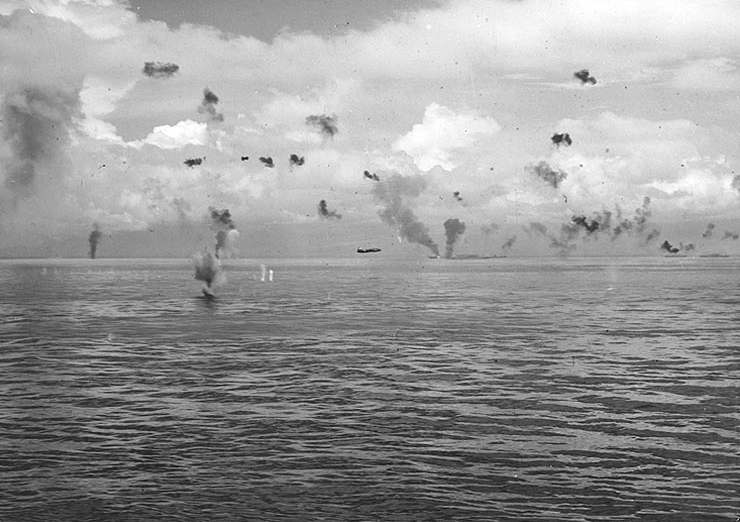
Mitsubishi G4M1s making a torpedo attack at Guadalcanal on August 8, 1942.

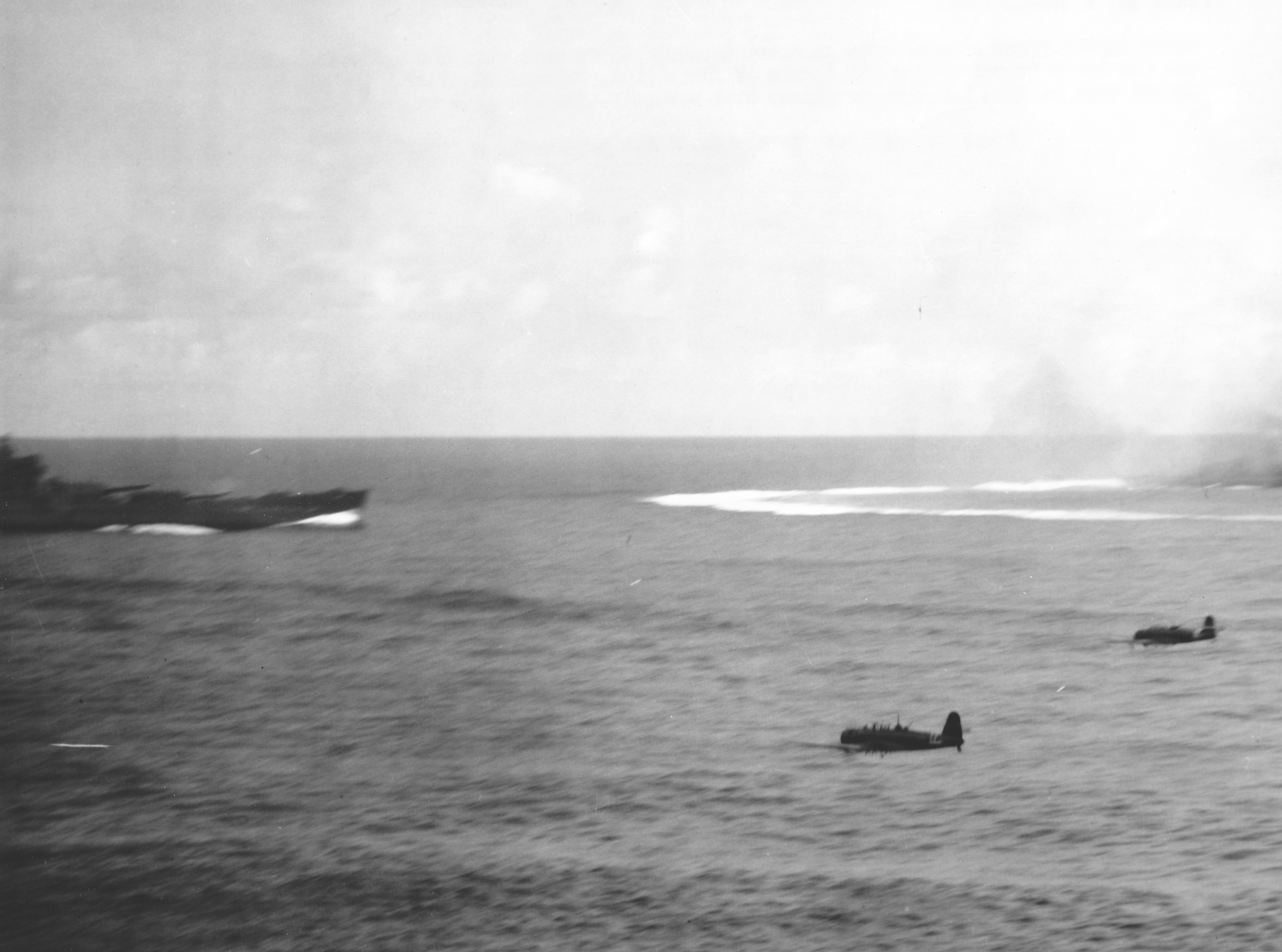
Nakajima B5N2s making a torpedo attack at Santa Cruz on 26 October 1942

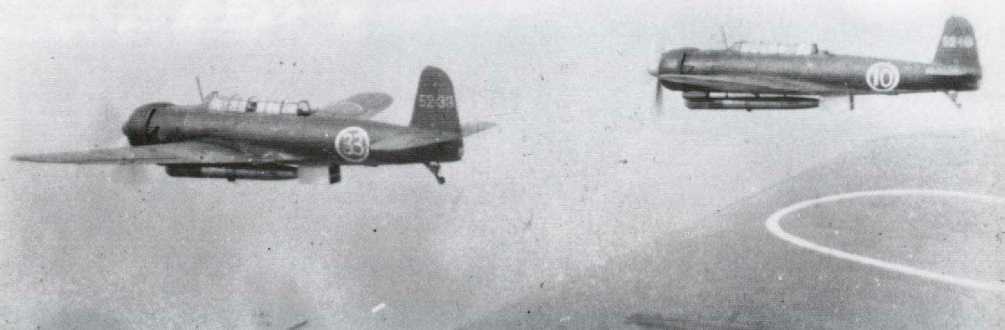
Nakajima B6N2s in formation flight with torpedoes with box type tail stabilizers

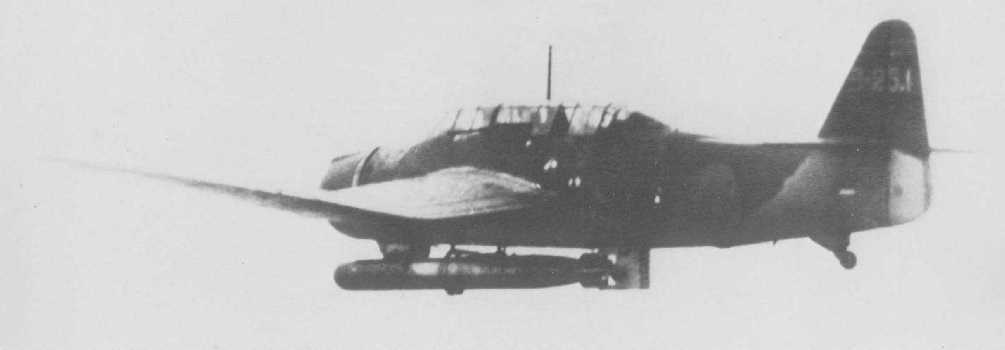
Aichi B7A Ryusei carrying torpedo with cross type tail stabilizer plates, 1945

Chronological Table
1931 – Type 91 aerial torpedo is put into service, production begins.
1936 – Revision 1. Self-detachable wooden plates are introduced.
1937 – Launch-tests at 500 and 1,000 m (550 and 1,100 yd) with wooden damper.
1939 – Revision 2 starts production. Not running true after water entry is identified as a major problem.
1941 – Revision 2 clears the shallow water launching test due to the introduction of an anti-rolling controller. Attack on Pearl Harbor, sinking of HMS Prince of Wales and HMS Repulse.
1941 – Revision 3 starts production.
1942 – Indian Ocean raid, Battle of the Coral Sea, Battle of Midway, Battle of the Santa Cruz Islands. 2 August: Type 91 torpedo technology reaches Nazi Germany via IJN sub I-30
1943 – Revision 5 starts production.
1944 – Battle of the Philippine Sea, Aerial Battle of Taiwan-Okinawa.

=== Initial development ===
Rear Admiral Seiji Naruse led the team in charge of the initial development of the Type 91 aerial torpedo at the Yokosuka Naval Arsenal. The team was known as the Ninety One Association and included Lt Cmdr Haruo Hirota, Lt Cmdr Makoto Kodaira (Matsunawa), Naval Assistant Manager Iyeta, Naval Engineer Noma, Naval Engineer Moritoshi Maeda, Lieutenant Hidehiko Ichikawa, and Teruyuki Kawada, a university student who was a naval apprentice.

Captain Fumio Aiko was in charge of further development of the torpedo from 1931. Captain Aiko managed the team as it developed an effective aerial torpedo and anti-rolling controller. He considered the Type 91 aerial torpedo to be his great achievement.

=== Delayed development ===
At the beginning of 1934, Kan-Pon or the Imperial Japanese Navy Technical Department, an operating division of the Ministry of the Navy of the Imperial Japanese government, which had the primary responsibility for naval weapon systems, had their own plan for a Japanese aerial torpedo. In their concept, a big flying boat was to carry a variant of the heavy Type 93 oxygen torpedoes to launch at long range, and then turn back towards safety. This eventually proved to be an unrealistic desk plan. Kan-Pon confidentially developed their own Type 94 torpedo and even ordered a halt to production of the Type 91. This significantly delayed the development schedule of the Type 91 and frustrated the project members.

=== Wooden tail stabilizers added ===
The project team developed Kyoban wooden aerodynamic stabilizer plates for the Type 91's tail fins as revision 1 in 1936. These stabilized the torpedo in flight to ensure the proper angle for water entry and were designed to shear off on entry to the water, preventing the torpedo from diving too deep. The team demonstrated their effectiveness in tests at altitudes of both 500 and 1,000 m (550 and 1,100 yd) the following year.

The original Type 91 was considered to have a frail body, and so this was strengthened in a new model in 1938 known as revision 2.

=== Anti-rolling controller developed ===
Type 91 aerial torpedoes won admiration for their effective anti-rolling controller and acceleration control system. Before the anti-rolling controller was introduced, the early versions of the Type 91 had serious problems, as did all other aerial torpedoes of the time. When released at high speed, it had a tendency to make a double-roll in the air. When released into heavy seas, a spin could be imparted by the hard impact on water entry. Other issues included: the running direction veering on water impact; not running horizontally after water entry, but continuing vertically to either stick in the bottom of shallow water or be crushed by the water pressure (at a depth of 100 m or so); jumping back out of the water; skipping along the water surface; or even running backwards. Only very experienced aviators could be sure of a clean torpedo bombing run, and then only when operating over a calm sea. A tumbling torpedo will run out of control once it hits the water. The gyrocompass and the depth meter may work well, but the torpedo cannot control the running direction by tail rudders unless they are initially in the neutral position. Once the torpedo rolls, the horizontal and vertical rudders lose their positions, resulting in a runaway.

The specification for the launch speed of aircraft was increased from 240 to 330 km/h (130 to 180 kn) with the expectation that it would be increased again. The engineers and scientists of the Type 91 project concluded that any aerial torpedo needed an anti-rolling system with not only a damping stabilizer function but also an acceleration controlling function. Without these features any torpedo would be highly likely to fall into an unstable state. The idea of acceleration-control, or counter-steering, was at the time widely considered to be impossible.

A breakthrough on aerial torpedo design was made with the anti-rolling controller invented first by Iyeda, assistant manager of the arsenal workmen, in spring 1941. Ten days later, while the Iyeda system was being tested, Naval Engineer Noma invented another system. It functioned in a similar way, but with a different mechanism. During the prototype tests, Noma's system was found to be the better, having less time lag in its responses. So the Noma system was adopted for the next production version of Type 91 and it went into final testing in August 1941, making practical the use of aerial torpedoes both in rough seas and in shallow waters. It enabled the Type 91 rev.2 to run under water no deeper than 20 meters, with experienced pilots learning to launch their torpedo so as to sink to a depth of no more than 10 meters.

=== Increase in explosive weight ===
The anti-rolling controller also made it possible for the Type 91 to carry a heavier warhead. The Type 91 rev.1 warhead weighed 213.5 kg (471 lb) with a high explosive charge of 149.5 kg (330 lb), but the rev.2 warhead weighed 276 kg (608 lb) with 204 kg (450 lb) of high explosive. Warhead rev.7, which was carried by twin-engine bombers, weighed 526 kg (1,160 lb) and boasted a high explosive charge of 420 kg (930 lb); this was designed to pierce the reinforced armour plates of the latest US Navy ships.

== Production ==
The Type 91 was researched and developed at Yokosuka Naval Arsenal in Kanagawa Prefecture. It was first produced at the Mitsubishi-Urakami Ordnance Works division of Mitsubishi Heavy Industries. Later, the Imperial Japanese Navy established two manufacturing sites: Suzuka Naval Arsenal in Mie Prefecture; and Kawatana Naval Arsenal, a branch of Sasebo Naval Arsenal, in Nagasaki Prefecture. The Mitsubishi-Urakami Ordnance Works plant at Kawatana specialized in torpedo production and was destroyed by the atomic bomb dropped on Nagasaki.

== Technology transfer to Germany ==
Germany approached Japan requesting the transfer of Japanese aerial torpedo technology. In a yanagi mission the Imperial Japanese Navy sent the plans and a number of Type 91 aerial torpedoes on Japanese submarine I-30 (a large cruiser type submarine) which arrived in Lorient on August 2, 1942. It was designated the Lufttorpedo LT 850 in German service. The weight of the LT 850 German version was somewhat lighter at 810 kg (1,790 lb), with a 5.43 m (17.8 ft) length.

Germany wished to acquire the knowledge behind the Imperial Japanese Navy Air Service's aerial torpedo technology in order to more effectively attack the Allied transport ships steaming in the Mediterranean Sea. It had previously imported Italian-made aerial torpedoes, which became unavailable following the Italian Armistice of Cassibile with the Allies in September 1943. The indigenous German aerial torpedo designs were badly restricted in launch speed and launch altitude.

== Variants ==
Type 91 Aerial Torpedo and Type 91 Warhead, operational models
Main body	Warhead type	Warhead weight	Speed	Range	Total Length	Diameter	Total Weight	Head Length (m)	Head Weight (kg)	Comments
Type 91	Type 91	149.5 kg (330 lb)	78 km/h (42 kn)	2,000 m (2,200 yd)	5.270 m (17.29 ft)	450 mm (18 in)	784 kg (1,728 lb)	0.958	213.5	–
Rev.1	Rev.1	149.5 kg (330 lb)	78 km/h (42 kn)	2,000 m (2,200 yd)	5.270 m (17.29 ft)	450 mm (18 in)	784 kg (1,728 lb)	0.958	213.5	Supported shedding wooden tail-plates in 1936, first model considered for German LT 850 version
Rev.2	Rev.2	204.0 kg (449.7 lb)	78 km/h (42 kn)	2,000 m (2,200 yd)	5.270 m (17.29 ft)	450 mm (18 in)	838 kg (1,847 lb)	1.158	276.5	Body reinforced in 1938, anti-rolling controller added in 1941, 2nd version considered for German LT 850 version
Rev.3	Rev.3	235.0 kg (518.1 lb)	78 km/h (42 kn)	2,000 m (2,200 yd)	5.270 m (17.29 ft)	450 mm (18 in)	848 kg (1,870 lb)	1.460	323.6	–
Rev.3	Rev.3_rev.	235.0 kg (518.1 lb)	78 km/h (42 kn)	2,000 m (2,200 yd)	5.270 m (17.29 ft)	450 mm (18 in)	848 kg (1,870 lb)	1.460	323.6	Reinforced warhead
Rev.5	Rev.3_rev.	235.0 kg (518.1 lb)	76 km/h (41 kn)	1,500 m (1,600 yd)	5.270 m (17.29 ft)	450 mm (18 in)	848 kg (1,870 lb)	1.460	323.6	Precision forging and stainless steel cast body
Rev.5	Rev.7	420.0 kg (925.9 lb)	76 km/h (41 kn)	1,500 m (1,600 yd)	5.270 m (17.29 ft)	450 mm (18 in)	1,080 kg (2,380 lb)	1.900	526.0	Warhead designed to breach the armor of US battleships

The Type 91 (modification 2), was a shallow-water aerial torpedo that was designed for and used in the attack on Pearl Harbor in 1941. Wooden fins and a softwood breakaway nose cone were added to allow for launching into shallow water at low altitudes.

There were two versions in the Type 91 warhead rev.3, differing in designed maximum launch speeds.

Later, heavier models had a decreased range.

== Further development ==
In spring 1944, the Yokosuka air arsenal began development of the Shisei Gyorai M (trial model torpedo M), or simply the "Two tonne torpedo". This was an enlarged version of the Type 91 aerial torpedo and was 533 mm (21.0 in) in diameter, 7.10 m (23.3 ft) long, weighing 2,070 kg (4,560 lb), and carrying a 750 kg (1,650 lb) warhead. It would have been the largest aerial torpedo in the Imperial Japanese Navy Air Force, but the operating concept became outdated and the project was never completed. However, the Type 91 aerial torpedo project members did not regard it as a part of the Type 91 series.

== Post-war commemoration ==
Some 30 years after the war, surviving members of the development team raised money to privately publish a small book, Koku Gyorai Note or Aerial Torpedo Notebook.

Type 91 torpedoes are currently displayed at the Etajima school of Japan Maritime Self-Defense (the Maritime Self Defense Force 1st Technical School) and Shimofusa Base. They are missing the roll rudders. An excavated Type 91 aerial torpedo is preserved at the Resource Museum in JGSDF Camp Naha, 1st Combined Brigade of The Western Army, JGSDF, located in Naha city, Okinawa. It retains the original features. It was picked up as unexploded ordnance by a bomb-disposal unit of the JGSDF. A captured Type 91 aerial torpedo is displayed at the US Naval Academy, Annapolis, Maryland. It rests on two supports flanking a pathway in a small park in front of the Academy's Dahlgren Hall. Displayed on the other side of the pathway is a Type 93 Japanese Long Lance ship-launched torpedo.

== See also ==
- British 18-inch torpedo#Mark XII

== Notes ==
=== Bibliography ===
- Ichikawa, Hidehiko; Kodaira, Makoto; Kawada, Teruyuki (25 July 1985). Kyu Ichi Kai – Koku Gyorai Note [91 Association – Aerial Torpedo Notebook] (in Japanese). Tokyo, Japan: Iyeno Hikari Private Publishing Service. Privately printed book.
- "Warship Carrier Zuikaku Action Report No. 7, Battle of the Coral Sea". Kaigun Koku Bokan Sento Kiroku [Naval Aircraft Carrier Action Reports] (in Japanese). Tokyo, Japan: Athen-shobo. July 2002. Photographic print copies of Imperial Japanese Navy Action Reports.
- Ozawa, Kyuno Joe (1994). "Mitsubishi Type 4 Army Bomber Aircraft". Document of Historical Aircraft with Japan Making (in Japanese). Tokyo, Japan: Kanto-sha. pp. 196–222. ISSN 0450-6669. Ozawa is the designer of Ki-69.
- Seko, Tsutomu (December 1986). Raigeki no Tsubasa [Wings of Torpedo Bombers] (in Japanese). Tokyo, Japan: Kojin-sha. Seko was one of the last torpedo bombardiers of B6Ns.
- Minoru Akimoto (June 1995). Nihon Gunyoki Kokusen Zenshi [Japanese military aircraft air combat complete history] (in Japanese). Vol. 4. Tokyo, Japan: Green Arrow sha. ISBN 4-7663-3174-5.
- (August 1945), Resources from Torpedo bombing section, Kawatana branch, Naval aerial technology arsenal, Imperial Japanese Navy.
- (August 1945), Resources from the 1st torpedo section, Kawatana naval arsenal production firm, Imperial Japanese Navy.
