= Seiji Naruse =

Japanese rear admiral (1893–1960)

Rear admiral Seiji Naruse
- 成瀬 正二
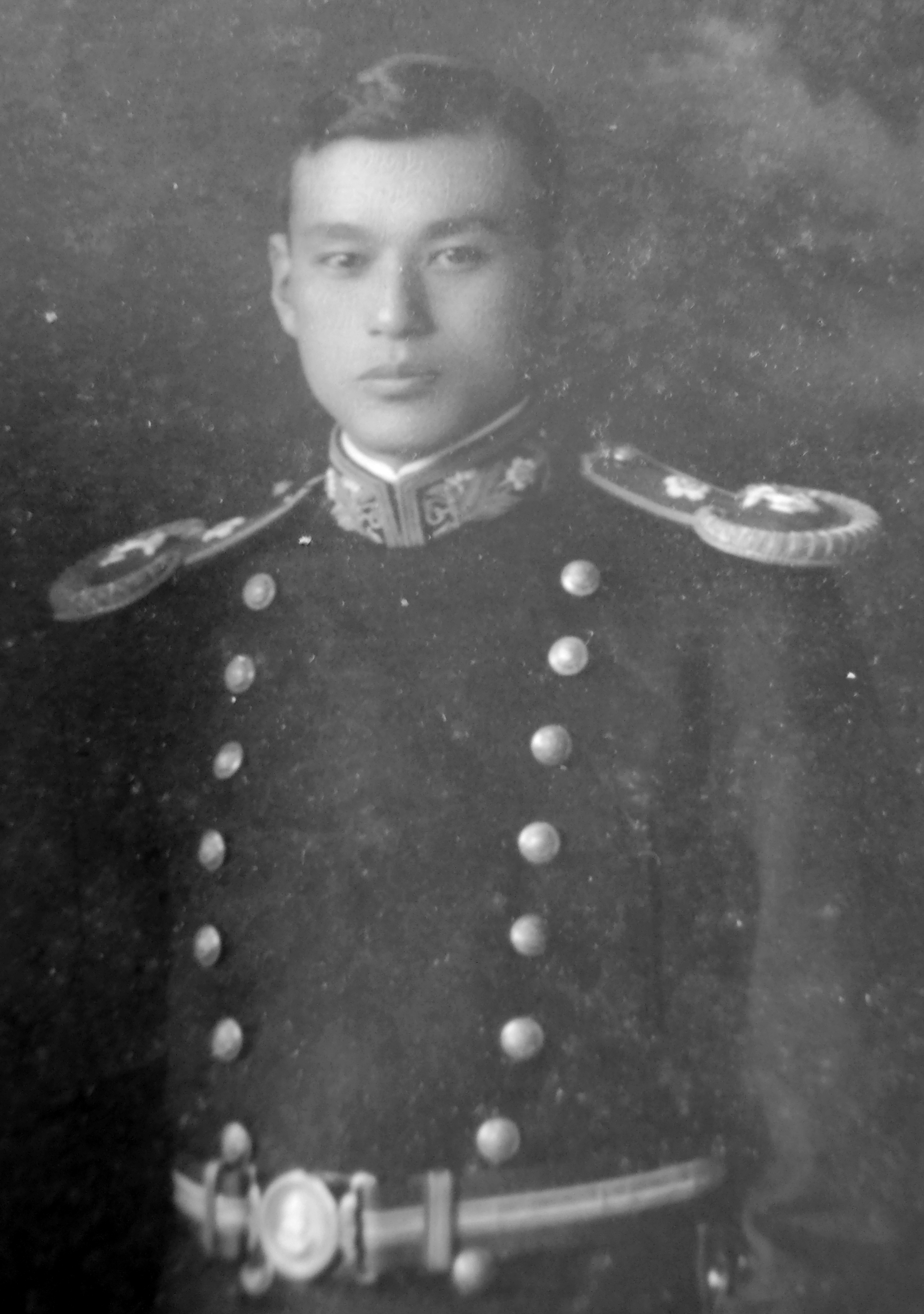
- Born: December 26, 1893; Yokohama, Kanagawa, Japan
- Died: January 29, 1960 (aged 66); Yakuo-ji, Shinjuku, Japan
- Military career
- Allegiance: Empire of Japan
- Branch: Imperial Japanese Navy
- Service years: 1920–1945
- Rank: Rear Admiral
- Awards: 4th class, Order of the Sacred Treasure

Seiji Naruse (成瀬 正二, Naruse Seiji; December 26, 1893 – January 29, 1960) was a Japanese rear-admiral and engineer. He was the only person who was posted as a director of the Torpedo Development Division in Yokosuka Naval District of Imperial Japanese Navy. He and his team designed and developed the Type 91 torpedo used in naval warfare by the Imperial Japanese Navy during World War II.

== Early life and education ==
Seiji Naruse was born as the second son of Viscount Masayasu Naruse on December 26, 1893, in Yokohama, Japan. His father, Masayasu was president of "The 15 Bank" and was also managing other banks and companies. Thus, he grew up in a wealthy environment with his brothers (Seiichi Naruse, Shunsuke Naruse, etc.), and graduated First Higher School.

He studied in Tokyo Imperial University (now University of Tokyo), and majored in weapons technology in Faculty of Engineering. In 1920 he graduated Tokyo Imperial University and entered Imperial Japanese Navy as an Engineer officer.

== Military career ==
Seiji Naruse started his military career on July 21 (1920) in Yokosuka Naval District as an engineer of naval weapons. Then, he was promoted to the position of assistant division chief at the Kure Naval Arsenal on December 23, 1922.

The year 1925 was a major turning point for him. He was promoted to the position of development management officer in the Imperial Japanese Navy Technical Department, and sent to the United Kingdom from May 20, 1925, to October 15, 1926. The purpose of this tour of duty was obtaining aerial torpedo technology, which did not exist in Japan at that time. Therefore, he diligently visited arsenals in the UK.

After he returned, he began a project to develop the first (and last) domestic Aerial torpedo. He started development of this aerial torpedo at the Yokosuka Naval Arsenal on May 1, 1927. On December 1 (1930), he moved to the Combined Fleet for the examination of the prototype. Finally, he engaged the production and subsequent deployment of the completed "Type 91 torpedo" as the development management officer in the Imperial Japanese Navy Technical Department from December 1, 1931.

He and his team continuously improved the Type 91 torpedo at the Yokosuka Naval Arsenal (from December 1, 1932), the Kure Naval Arsenal (from July 1, 1936), and the Yokosuka Naval Air Technical Arsenal (from June 15, 1940). There were multiple revisions. On April 1 (1943), the Imperial Japanese Navy created the Torpedo Development Division for him, and he worked as the director of this new division until the end of World War II.

During the World War II, the Type 91 torpedo was used as a main weapon for Naval warfare, affixed to and deployed from the underbelly of aircraft.

=== Dates of rank ===
- Lieutenant junior grade (July 21, 1920)
- Lieutenant (December 1, 1922)
- Lieutenant commander (December 1, 1927)
- Commander (November 15, 1933)
- Captain (November 15, 1938)
- Rear admiral (May 1, 1944)

== Post war ==
On September 30 (1945), with the dissolution of the Imperial Japanese Navy (following the Surrender of Japan), Seiji Naruse retired from his post. After retirement, he managed to convert the defunct arsenal site for Japan's post-war industrial recovery. Tokyu Car Corporation was a notable user of this site.

In 1952, along with the foundation of the Technical Research and Development Institute within the National Safe Agency, he worked at the 5th Research Center and handed his torpedo technology and expertise onto the next generation.

== Personal life ==
Seiji Naruse married Sumi Nakamura (January 26, 1900 – December 23, 1994), who was a daughter of Lieutenant general Yūjirō Nakamura.
Together, they had three children.

=== Family ===
- Father: Masayasu Naruse (Viscount, president of "The 15 Bank")
- Older brother: Seiichi Naruse (Writer, Professor of French Literature in Kyushu University)
- Younger brother: Shunsuke Naruse (Diplomat)

== See also ==
- Type 91 torpedo
- Yokosuka Naval Air Technical Arsenal
- Yokosuka Naval District
- Imperial Japanese Navy
- Technical Research and Development Institute

== Bibliography ==
- "Record of Aerial Torpedo Development (航空魚雷ノート)", Kyu-ichi Kai, 1985
