= Musée Marmottan Monet =

Art museum in Paris, France

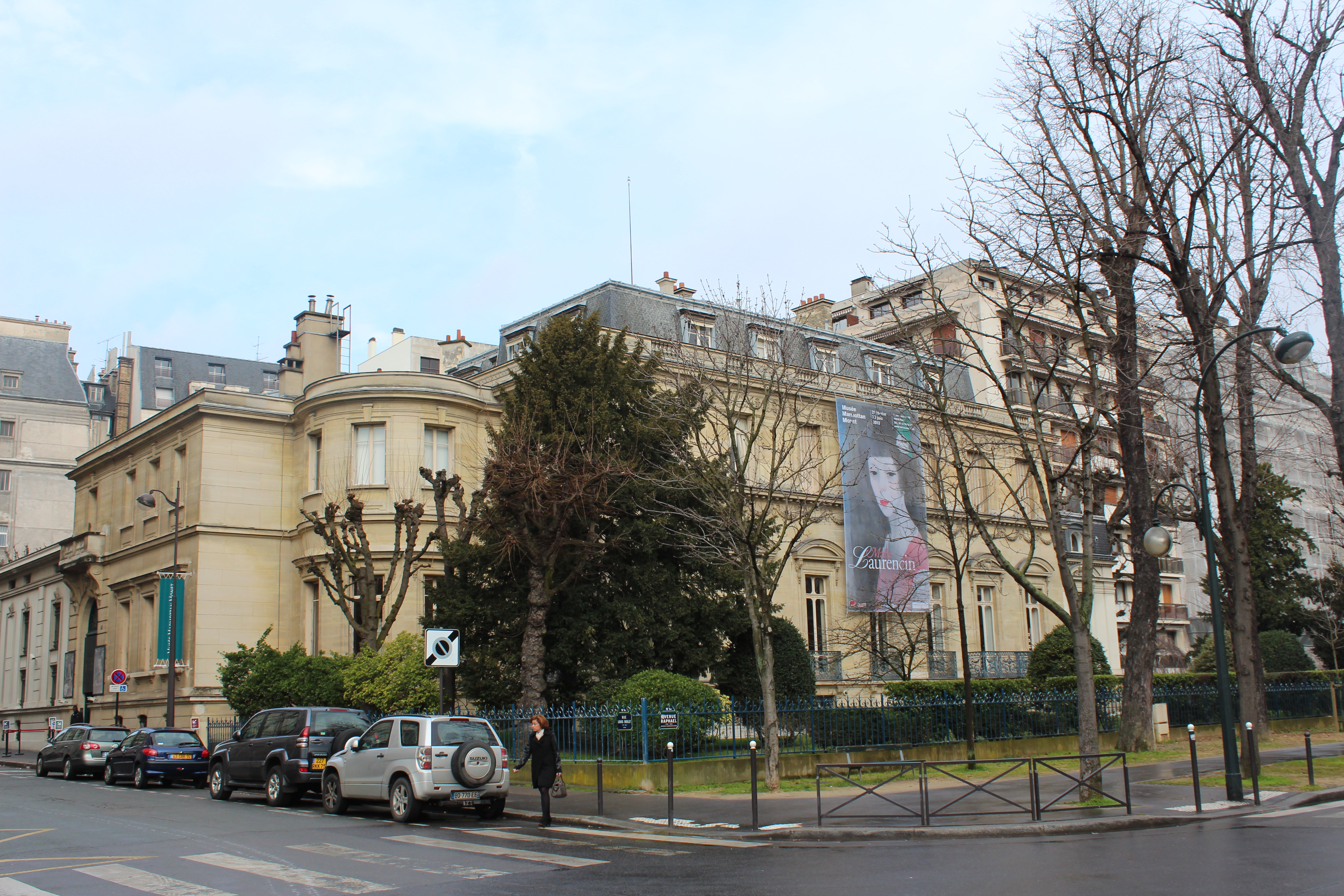
- Established: 1934; 92 years ago
- Location: 2, Rue Louis-Boilly, 16th arrondissement of Paris
- Coordinates: 48.8593°N 2.2673°E
- Website: www.marmottan.fr

The Musée Marmottan Monet (French pronunciation: [myze maʁmɔtɑ̃ mɔnɛ]; 'Marmottan Monet Museum') is an art museum in Paris, France, dedicated to artist Claude Monet. The collection features over three hundred Impressionist and post-Impressionist paintings by Monet, including his 1872 Impression, Sunrise. A number of Impressionist works by other painters are also displayed; the museum hosts the largest Berthe Morisot public collection in the world.

The museum finds its origin in the 1932 donation by art historian Paul Marmottan of his father's pavillon de chasse, that he transformed into an hôtel particulier and which now houses the museum, to the Académie des Beaux-Arts, along with a sizeable family collection from the Renaissance and the Napoleonic era. The museum opened in 1934; its fame is the result of a donation in 1966 by Michel Monet, Claude's second son and only heir.

== History ==
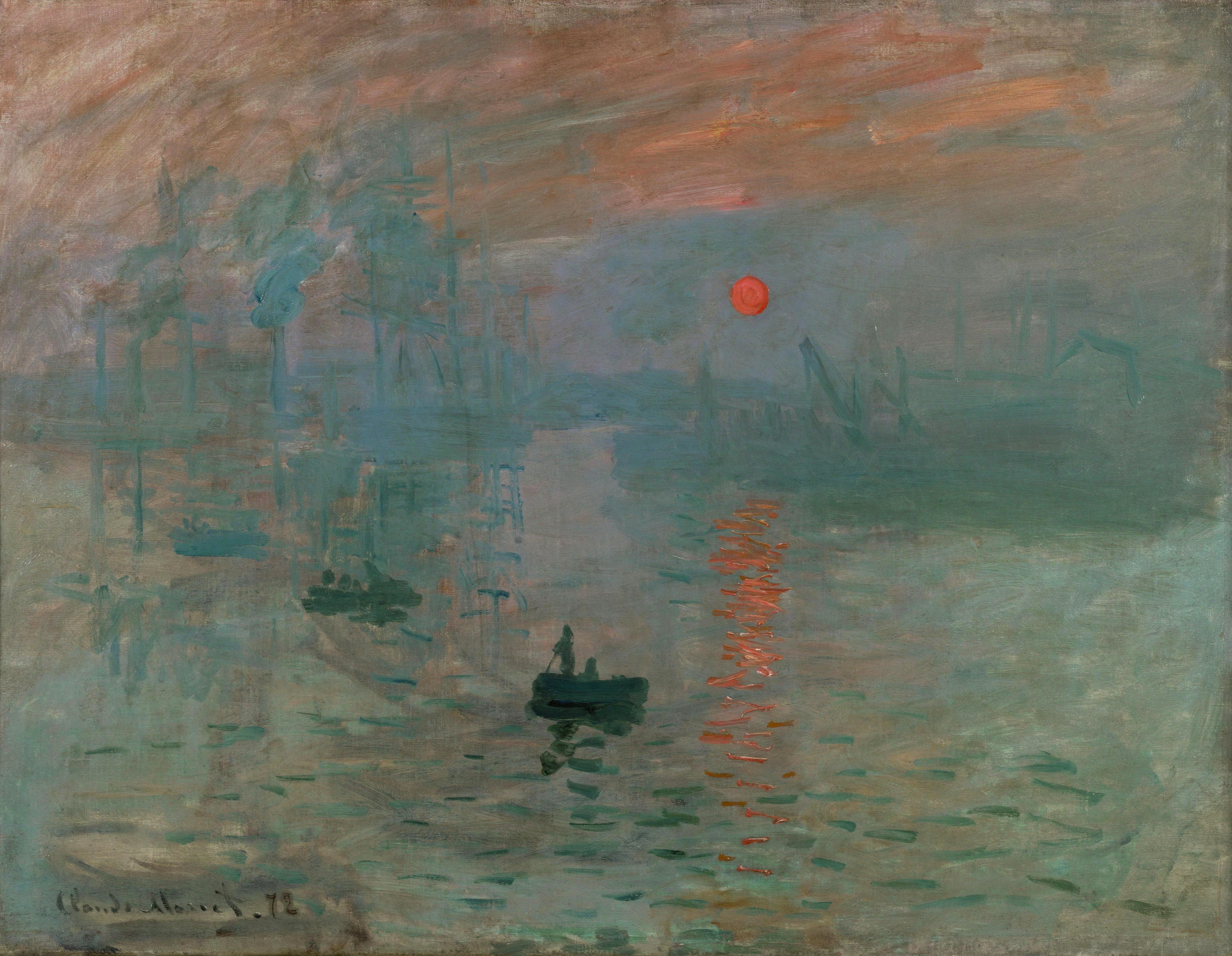
Monet's Impression, Sunrise (1872), which inspired the name of the Impressionist movement, is exhibited in the museum.

Originally a hunting lodge for the Duke of Valmy, the building at the edge of the Bois de Boulogne was purchased in 1882 by Jules Marmottan, who later left it to his son, Paul Marmottan. The latter moved into the lodge and, with an interest in the Napoleonic era, he expanded his father's collection of paintings, furniture and bronzes. Marmottan bequeathed his home and collection, as well as his library (the Bibliothèque Marmottan in Boulogne), to the Académie des Beaux-Arts. The Académie opened up the house and collection as the Musée Marmottan in 1934.

=== 1985 theft ===
On October 27, 1985, during daylight hours, five masked gunmen with pistols threatening security and visitors entered the museum and stole nine paintings from the collection. Among them were Impression, Sunrise (Impression, soleil levant) by Claude Monet, the painting from which the Impressionism movement took its name. Aside from that also stolen were Camille Monet and Cousin on the Beach at Trouville, Portrait of Jean Monet, Portrait of Poly, Fisherman of Belle-Isle and Field of Tulips in Holland also by Monet, Bather Sitting on a Rock and Portrait of Monet by Pierre-Auguste Renoir, Young Woman at the Ball by Berthe Morisot, and Portrait of Monet by Seiichi Naruse. The stolen paintings were valued at $12 million.

A tip-off led to the arrest in Japan of a yakuza gangster named Shuinichi Fujikuma who had spent time in French prison for trafficking heroin and was sentenced for five years. There he met Philippe Jamin and Youssef Khimoun who were part of an art syndicate. Fujikuma, Jamin and Khimoun planned the Marmottan theft. In Fujikuma's house, police found a catalog with all the stolen paintings from the museum circled. Also found were two paintings by Jean-Baptiste-Camille Corot stolen in 1984 from a museum in France. This led to the recovery of the stolen paintings in a small villa in Corsica in December 1990.

== Collections ==
Though originally a showcase for pieces from the First Empire, the nature of the museum's collection began to change with two major donations. In 1957, Victorine Donop de Monchy gave the museum an important collection of Impressionist works that had belonged to her father, Doctor Georges de Bellio, physician to Manet, Monet, Pissarro, Sisley and Renoir, and an early supporter of the Impressionist movement. In 1966, Claude Monet's second son, Michel Monet, left the museum his own collection of his father's work, thus creating the world's largest collection of Monet paintings. In 1985, Nelly Duhem, adopted daughter of the painter Henri Duhem, donated his large collection of Impressionist and Post-Impressionist works (which included several Monets) to the museum.

Since 1975 the museum has organized two exhibitions annually dedicated to an individual or collections, including Toulouse-Lautrec in 1976, Boilly in 1984, Daumier in 1989, Goya in 1990, Boldini in 1991 and Pissarro in 2017. The museum's paintings from late in the career of Claude Monet were exhibited at the New Orleans Museum of Art and Fine Arts Museums of San Francisco in 1995. The works later traveled to the Walters Art Museum, San Diego Museum of Art and Portland Museum of Art in 1998–1999.

The museum also contains works by Berthe Morisot, Edgar Degas, Édouard Manet, Alfred Sisley, Camille Pissarro, Paul Gauguin, Paul Signac, Pierre-Auguste Renoir, and others. It also houses the Wildenstein Collection of illuminated manuscripts and the Jules and Paul Marmottan collection of Napoleonic era art and furniture.

== Design and layout ==
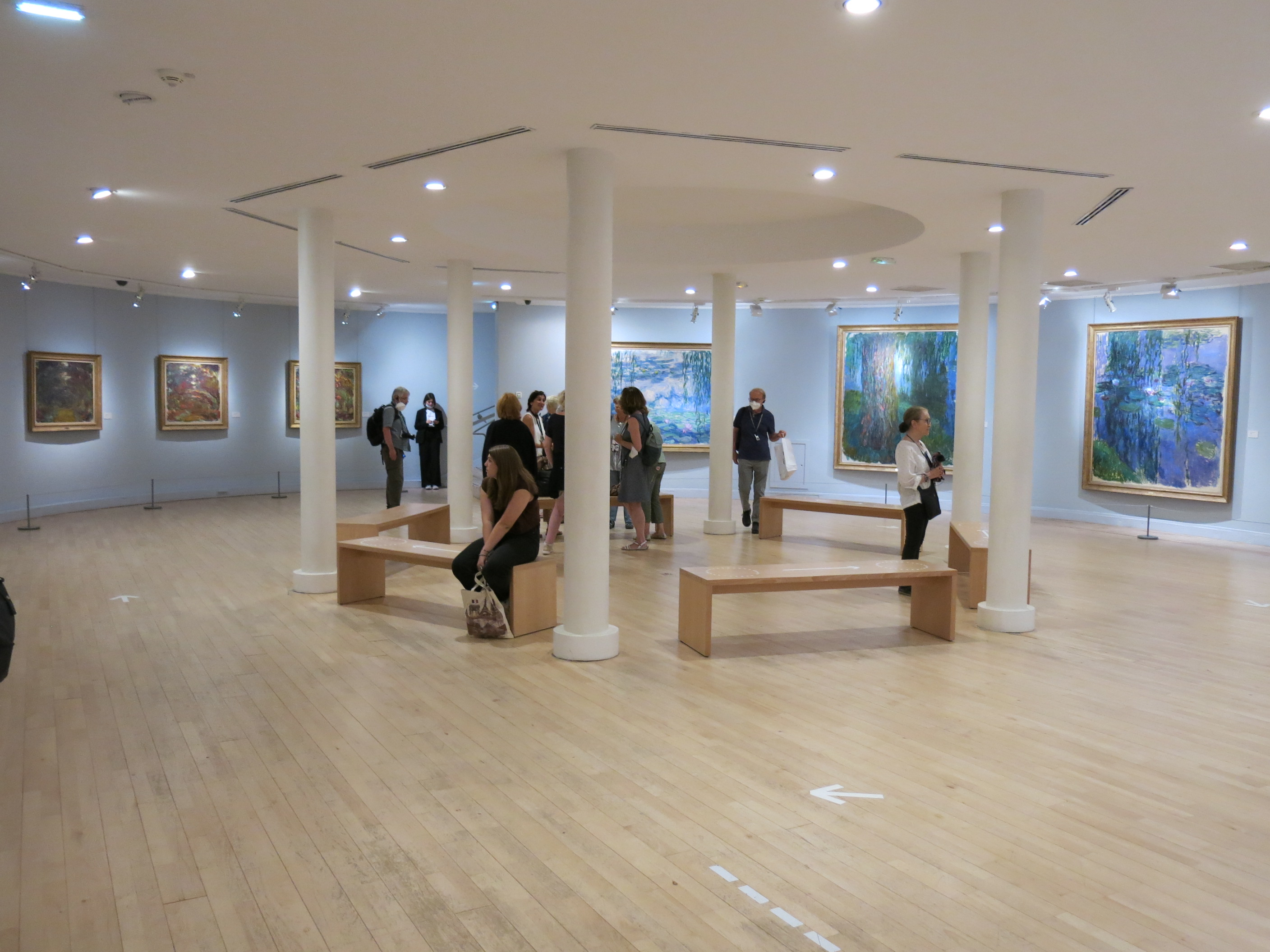
Nymphéas gallery

Jacque Carlu, then curator of the museum, built a special exhibition space for the Monet collection in a lower level of the museum. Inspired by the hall designed for Monet's Water Lilies murals in the Musée de l'Orangerie, the large, open room allows visitors to see a progression of Monet's work, as well as to view his canvases both up close and from afar. One of the most notable pieces in the museum is Monet's Impression, Sunrise (Impression, Soleil Levant), the painting from which the Impressionist movement took its name. The painting was stolen from the Musée Marmottan in 1985 but was recovered five years later, and it was returned to the permanent exhibition in 1991.

== Location ==
The museum is located at 2, Rue Louis-Boilly in the 16th arrondissement of Paris. The nearest Métro station is La Muette, on Line 9.

== See also ==
- Fondation Monet in Giverny, Monet's home, studio, and gardens
- List of museums in Paris
- List of single-artist museums
- List of tourist attractions in Paris
