= Seiichi Naruse =

Japanese writer and linguist

Seiichi Naruse 成瀬 正一
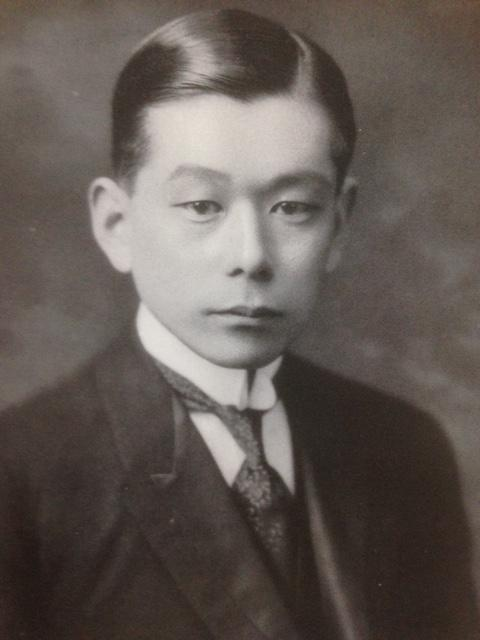
- Seiichi Naruse
- Born: 26 April 1892; Yokohama, Kanagawa Prefecture, Japan
- Died: 13 April 1936 (aged 43); Japan
- Occupations: Researcher of French literature, Writer
- Writing career
- Genres: French Romanticism, short stories, travel journals

Seiichi Naruse (成瀬 正一, Naruse Seiichi; 26 April 1892 – 13 April 1936) was a Japanese writer and researcher of French Romanticism. He was a professor of French literature at Kyushu University. He is known as the first Japanese having a friendship with Romain Rolland and also known as a collaborator with Kōjirō Matsukata in collecting paintings and sculptures for the Matsukata Collection of the National Museum of Western Art in Ueno, Tokyo.

== Early life (1892–1916) ==
Seiichi Naruse was born as the first son of Seikyo Naruse (成瀬正恭) on April 26, 1892. Seikyo Naruse was the president of the 15th Bank(Jūgo Ginkou) and also a manager of other banks and companies. Seiichi grew up in a wealthy environment with his brothers, including Seiji Naruse and Shunsuke Naruse (diplomat), and sisters. After he graduated from Azabu Junior High School and First Higher School, Japan (第一高等学校), he studied in the Faculty of Letters at Tokyo Imperial University (now University of Tokyo). In his college days, he started a literary magazine "Shin-shichou"( 新思潮, a new trend of thought) with his classmates: Ryūnosuke Akutagawa, Masao Kume, Kan Kikuchi and Yuzuru Matsuoka (松岡譲). In this magazine, they made their debut as writers. In later years, Akutagawa and Kikuchi became most important novelists in Japan. Naruse was a good linguist. He learned English and German at high school and college. He learned French under a private teacher Hana Yamata (younger sister of Kiku Yamata). After he read the 10-volume Jean-Christophe, he became an admirer of Romain Rolland and his pacifist thoughts. His French was good enough to exchange letters with Rolland. Just before graduation, in cooperation with Ryūnosuke Akutagawa, Masao Kume and Yuzuru Matsuoka, he published a Japanese version of Rolland's Life of Tolstoy (translated from its English version) by permission of Rolland himself.

== Visit to the U.S.A and Europe (1916–1918) ==
In 1916, just after graduation, he went to live in New York. He had wanted to go to Europe to see Rolland, but the World War I prevented him from doing so. Though he was enrolled at the Columbia Graduate School of Arts and Sciences, he spent much of his time going to theaters in Broadway and going to see his favorite artworks in the Metropolitan Museum of Art, the Brooklyn Museum and the Hispanic Society of America . He was also active in writing short stories and reports for "Shin-shichou". In answer to a journalist's request, he contributed a report "My First Night in New York" to a local newspaper the New York World. In his journal "Trip to Florida", he commented on the American journalism and segregation, which was a rare record of the American South on the eve of America's entry into the World War I. He was asked to write an essay on Japan by his friend, Waldo Frank. "Young Japan" was written in English and published in The Seven Arts (pp. 616–26, April issue, 1917). In it are fully described the hope and despair of Japanese intellectuals who were at a loss in a sudden flood of Western cultures after the Meiji Restoration.

Meanwhile, he moved to Boston, where he took literary courses at Boston University and worked part-time as an explainer of ukiyo-e at the Museum of Fine Arts, Boston. Both in New York and in Boston, he was greatly impressed with real paintings and sculptures of the great masters, which he had only seen in books in Japan. In his college days, he often put in an order at the bookstore for foreign books such as "Collected Drawings of Aubrey Beardsley". His favorites in museums in New York were Millet, Goya, Chavanne, Rembrant and Rodin. He often wrote about his exciting experiences to his friends in Japan.

In March 1918, he set sail from New York for Europe at the risk of being attacked by German U-boats, hoping to do volunteer work for the Red Cross. He arrived safely in Paris, but as the artillery fire from Germany became severe, he was evacuated to Ryon. It was not until in the middle of July that he crossed the French border into Switzerland. In Geneva, in a small island on the lake Leman, he happened to visit a statue of Jean-Jacques Rousseau, whose philosophy would become a longterm subject of Naruse's research. He finally met Romain Rolland in Villeneuve. He stayed there for about 3 weeks. Day in, day out, they discussed literature and culture both in the East and the West. Naruse gave a full account of the actual situation of Japan in those days. They foretold the outbreak of the Pacific War between America and Japan. We now know the details of their discussions, because Rolland wrote down every single word that Naruse told him in his "Journal des Années de Guerre" (November, 1916～1918), (Éditions Albin Michel, Paris). The journal was published in 1952, 34 years after their meeting in Villeneuve, 12 years after Naruse's death. On his way home from Switzerland, Naruse stayed in Pairs for a while, where he luckily encountered with the victory celebration of the World War I. He wrote his impression of it to Rolland and for a Japanese newspaper, Jiji shinpō(時事新報). Soon after he got home, he decided on researching into French literature as his lifework instead of writing novels.

== Life in Paris (1921–1925) ==
In February 1919, he married Fukuko Kawasaki, a daughter of Yoshitarō Kawasaki, granddaughter of Shōzō Kawasaki (Kawasaki Shōzō). Shōzō Kawasaki was the founder of the Kawasaki Shipbuilding Company (川崎造船); Yoshitarō Kawasaki was the vice president of it. In 1921, Seiichi took Fukuko with him to live in Paris, where he settled down to work on literary researches at the Sorbonne (University of Paris), in literary salons as their members and under private tutors.

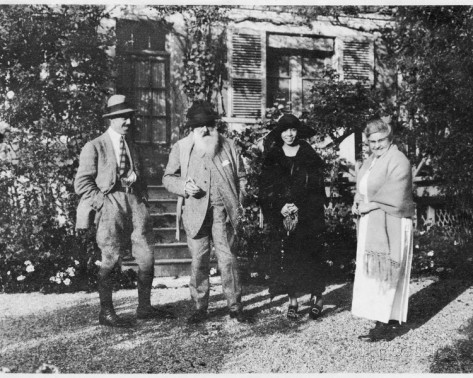
The photo taken in 1921 by Seiichi Naruse at Giverny. Michel Monet, Claude Monet, Fukuko Naruse and Blanche Hoschedé Monet are seen from the left to the right.

In the early stages of his four-year stay in Paris, he assisted Kōjirō Matsukata (president of the Kawasaki Shipbuilding Company) in collecting art works for the Matsukata Collection. Naruse and Matsukata went around art dealers and galleries such as Durand-Ruel and Bernheim-Jeune, often with Yukio Yashiro. Naruse recommended Matsukata to buy works by Gustave Moreau and Gustave Courbet in particular. In 1921, he visited Claude Monet at Giverny several times with Fukuko, Kōjirō Matsukata, Yukio Yashiro, Shizuka Sakazaki (art historian) and Sanji & Takeko Kuroki (Matsukata's niece). Naruse and Fukuko were good friends of Michel Monet and Blanche Hoschedé Monet, too. In 1923, the couple visited Claude Monet with Georges Clemenceau at a hospital in Neuilly when Claude had an operation for cataract. Naruse also visited Léonce Bénédite at the Musée Rodin with Matsukata. Naruse bought a bust of Victor Hugo by Auguste Rodin (the original plaster figure) from Bénédite himself.

His literary researches were mainly on French Romanticists in the 18th and 19th century such as Jean-Jacques Rousseau, Chateaubriand, Victor Hugo, Gautier, Flaubert and Montesquieu. His interest had already passed away from Romain Rolland, perhaps because Rolland had become too keen on the Soviet Communist Party. Naruse's study of Romanticism covered not only literary works and theatrical arts, but also personal histories of writers, the social trends and the living conditions of the periods.

In 1925, he decided to return to Japan. He had been recommended for a position at Kyushu University (one of the seven national universities in Japan) in Fukuoka-shi, Kyushu.

== Teaching at Kyushu University (1925–1936) ==
As a professor of French Literature in the Law and Literature Faculty, he taught the history of French Literature and Romanticism. His lectures were well prepared. In teaching each novel, poem or play, he shed light on the personality of the writer, took the social context into account, and cited examples from the original text. He also devoted some of his lectures to deal with comedies mostly performed at the Comédie-Française. His successful lectures were supported by his dozens of neatly written notebooks in which he organized his massive amount of research material gathered through many years. He often compared French writers with those of other countries, setting about a project in the new genre of comparative literature.

== Third Visit to Paris (1935) ==
In 1935, he was given a grant for research by the Kaln Foundation (Albert Kaln). He studied in Paris for 8 months, focusing on the theme: the influence of Lord Byron on the French Romanticism. He was also active in taking part in some official events. In May, he was invited as a guest speaker in the Great Auditorium at the Sorbonne(University of Paris). He gave a talk titled "Montaigne and the Wisdom of the Far East", in which he compared the selfless mental state of Montaigne with that of Yoshida Kenkō. Kenkō is the author of a famous essay named Tsurezuregusa(written in 1330～1331). In the same auditorium, he participated in the Semicentury Anniversary of Victor Hugo's Death as a delegate from Japan. His long friendship with Romain Rolland, which was not at all strong as in his youth, was seen in his letter to his wife Fukuko in which he was concerned about a souvenir from Japan for Rolland's new wife.

After he returned to Japan at the end of 1935, he was in poor health. On 13 April 1936, he died suddenly of cerebral hemorrhage at the age of 43. Death bereaved him of his wife Fukuko and three children. His successor as a researcher of French and comparative literature was one of his students, Yukio Ōtsuka(大塚幸男), who became a professor at Fukuoka University in later years.

== See also ==
- List of Japanese writers

== Literary works ==
- “A letter from Romain Rolland (ロオラン氏の手紙)”, Sihn-shichou, June 1916
- “Life of Tolstoy” by Romain Rolland (translation into Japanese from its English version), Shinchou-sha, March 1916
- “Voyage (航海)”, Sihn-shichou, November 1916
- “From New York – American Literature, Theater and Museum (紐育より – アメリカの文壇、劇場、美術館)”, Shin-shichou, November 1916
- “Individuality and Criticism in Creative Literature (創作における個人性と文芸批評)”, Shin-shichou, March 1917
- “Trip to Florida (フロリダ行き)”, Teikoku Bungaku, November 1917
- “Young Japan", The Seven Arts (pp. 616–26), April 1917
- “Travel to Canada (カナダの旅行)”, Teikoku Bungaku, February 1918
- “Three-weeks with Romain Rolland (ロオランとの三週間)”, Jiji-Shimpou, January 1919
- “Travel to Switzerland (瑞西の旅)”, Chu-ou Ko-ron, April 1919
- “Ivory Shimada (象牙島田)”, Yu-ben, May 1917
- “My Visit to Romain Rolland (ロマン・ロオラン訪問記)”, Ningen, February 1920
- “Literary Salons in the 18th Century (十八世紀に於ける文芸サロン)”, Literary Research, Kyushu University, 1932
- “Montaigne et la Sagesse d'Extrême-Orient", Université de Paris, Institut d'Etudes japonaises, Travaux et Conférences, Fascicule II, 1935
- “Research in French Literature, Volume I (仏蘭西文学研究 第一号)", edited by the Naruse Seiichi Memorial Committee, Hakusui-Sha, 1938
- “Research in French Literature, Volume II(仏蘭西文学研究 第二号)", edited by the Naruse Seiichi Memorial Committee, Hakusui-Sha, 1939
