= Paul Marmottan =

French art historian (1856–1932)

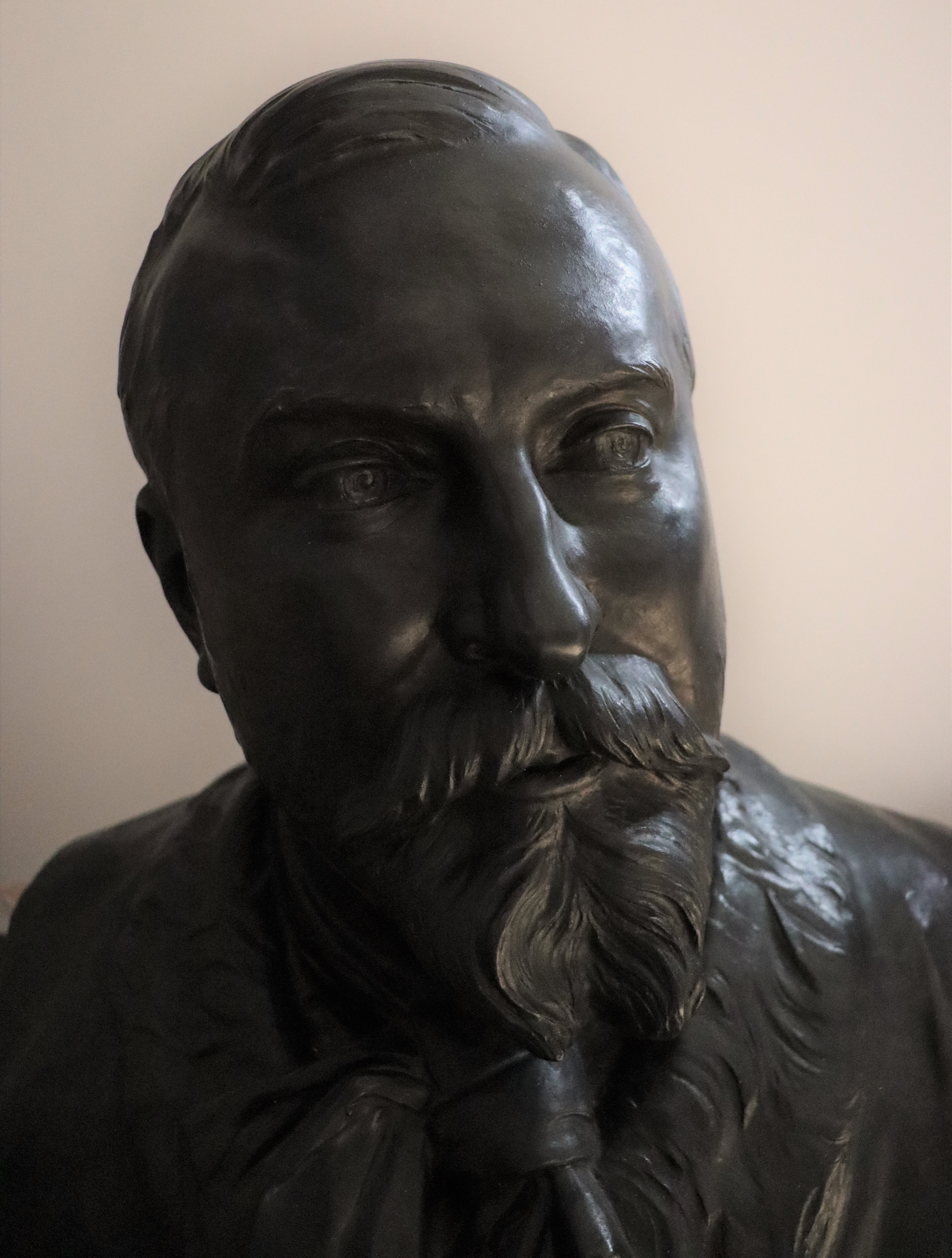
Marmottan by Gustave Crauk, c. 1900

Paul Marmottan (French pronunciation: [pɔl maʁmɔtɑ̃]; 26 August 1856 – 15 March 1932) was a French art historian, collector and patron. Both through his taste and his writings, he was a precursor in the knowledge and study of the First Empire period.

On his death, he bequeathed his collection, his Parisian mansion and his villa in Boulogne to the Académie des Beaux-Arts, which turned them into the Musée Marmottan (current Musée Marmottan Monet) and the Bibliothèque Marmottan respectively. His donations to the Assistance publique also enabled the creation of the Marmottan Hospital in Paris.

== Life ==
=== Education ===
From a family originating from Flanders, son of Jules Marmottan, a rich entrepreneur at the head of a mining company in Pas-de-Calais, Paul Albert Jules Marmottan was born in Paris on 26 August 1856.

From 1865 to 1874, he was educated at the college of Juilly, but in 1870, at his father's initiative, he spent several months in a Rhineland institution in Bonn, before the Franco-Prussian war led to his hasty return home. After the war, Paul Marmottan soon resumed his travels abroad: at the age of twenty, he had already visited Germany, Italy and, twice, Egypt.

=== A brief career in administration ===
After studying law at the University of Aix-en-Provence, he worked in the office of the Prefect of Vaucluse from 1880 and was also a trainee lawyer at the Court of Appeal in Paris. Thanks to the support of his paternal uncle, Henri Marmottan, deputy for the Seine department, he became advisor to the Eure departmental prefecture in 1882. However, this career, which he embarked on under pressure from his family, did not delight him at all.

=== The collector ===
The death of his father in 1883 enabled him to leave the high public service. Heir to a large fortune, the young Paul moved into the hunting lodge bought the previous year by Jules Marmottan on the edge of the Bois de Boulogne and devoted himself entirely to his passion for the history and art of the First Empire. Like his father before him, he started a collection. Originally from the north of France, it was only natural that he should take an interest in the painters of this region between the end of the 18th and the beginning of the 19th centuries, publishing in 1889 the first biography of the Watteau of Lille. He bought several paintings by the neoclassical landscape painters, about whom he wrote a reference book in 1886, L'École française de peinture (1789-1830), before publishing original research on Pierre-Henri de Valenciennes. More generally, it was a whole collection of paintings, furniture and objects from the Napoleonic period that he acquired and placed in his pavilion at the beginning of the century. Louis Boilly became one of his favourite artists: he collected some thirty of his portraits and in 1913 wrote an important monograph, Le peintre Louis Boilly (1761-1845). At the same time, Marmottan never stopped travelling in Europe to collect as many testimonies as possible, going as far as Poland and Russia in 1892 to follow in the footsteps of the Emperor and his Grande Armée.

=== The historian and the art historian ===
As a researcher, he collected thousands of books and documents from the Napoleonic period. He collected most of these materials in the villa he had built for himself in Boulogne-sur-Seine in the 1910s (now the Bibliothèque Marmottan), which he furnished in the Empire style. In the process, he became one of the best connoisseurs of the Empire, both in terms of its history and its art and administration. His method in art history was innovative for the time, as he always tried to prove his statements with evidence, which he quoted extensively in his works or even reproduced through photographs. His work also led him to become involved in associations. A founding member of the Société de la Sabretache in 1890 - which gave rise to the Musée historique de l'Armée, the forerunner of the Musée de l'Armée - Marmottan was made an officer of public education in 1894. He was also a member of the board of the Société des amis des monuments parisiens (1889-1900), vice-president (1906) and later president (1911-1913) of the Société historique d'Auteuil et de Passy, a member of the Société historique et archéologique des VIIIe et XVIIe arrondissements (1908), and finally a member of the Commission du Vieux-Paris from 1913 until his death.

=== The patron ===
During his lifetime, he supported around 20 museums throughout France, including the Musée d'Art et d'Histoire in Saint-Denis, which received 140,000 francs from him. He also left 100,000 francs in his will as a prize for a work of art history (Paul Marmottan Prize) and bequeathed his two residences and the collections kept there to the Académie des beaux-arts (Musée Marmottan-Monet and bibliothèque Marmottan). He also made a large donation to the Assistance publique, enabling the foundation of the hospital in the 17th arrondissement that now bears his name.

On 2 August 1922, he was made a Knight of the Legion of Honour by decree of the Minister of Public Education. Paul Marmottan was buried in a chapel in the Western Cemetery in Boulogne-Billancourt (6th Division).
