= Bibliothèque Marmottan =

Public library in Boulogne-Billancourt, France

Coordinates: 48.8432°N 2.2465°E

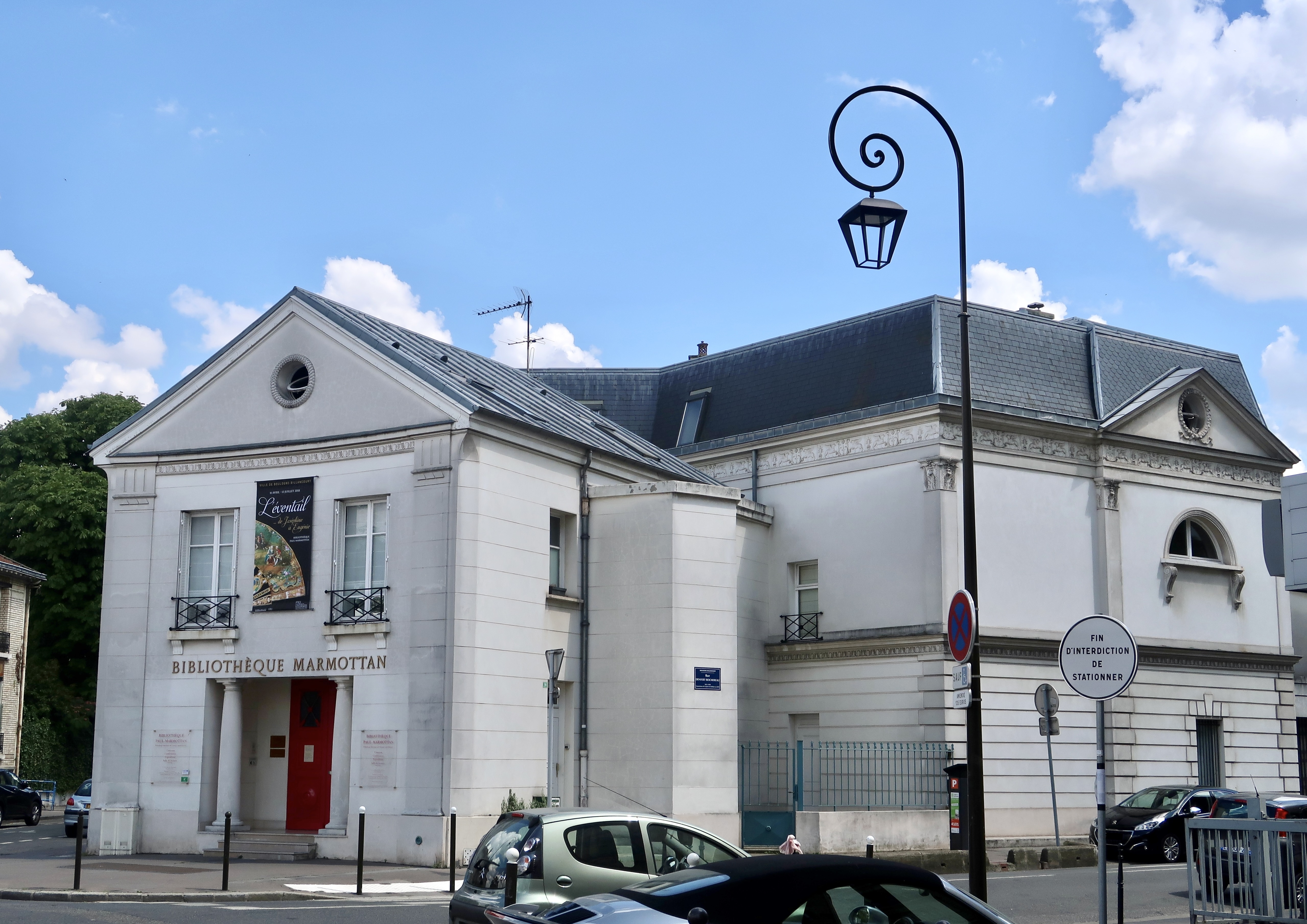
Entrance to the Bibliothèque Marmottan

The Bibliothèque Marmottan (French pronunciation: [biblijɔtɛk maʁmɔtɑ̃]), located in the Parisian suburb of Boulogne-Billancourt, is a public library bequeathed in 1932 to the Académie des Beaux-Arts by its founder Paul Marmottan.

Dedicated to the First French Empire and open to readers interested in this period, it contains some 25,000 books and periodicals, making it one of the largest Napoleonic libraries in the world.

While it regularly hosts scholars in residence, it will also, from 2023, have three apartments for artists whose work will be presented in the exhibition rooms.

== Historical background ==
Shortly after the death of his father, Jules Marmottan (1829–1883), a wealthy director of the Bruay mining company, the young Paul decided to devote himself entirely to his passion for Napoleon and the French Empire. In 1882, he owned a private mansion in Paris, now the musée Marmottan-Monet, and a few years later he acquired a plot of land in Boulogne-Billancourt.

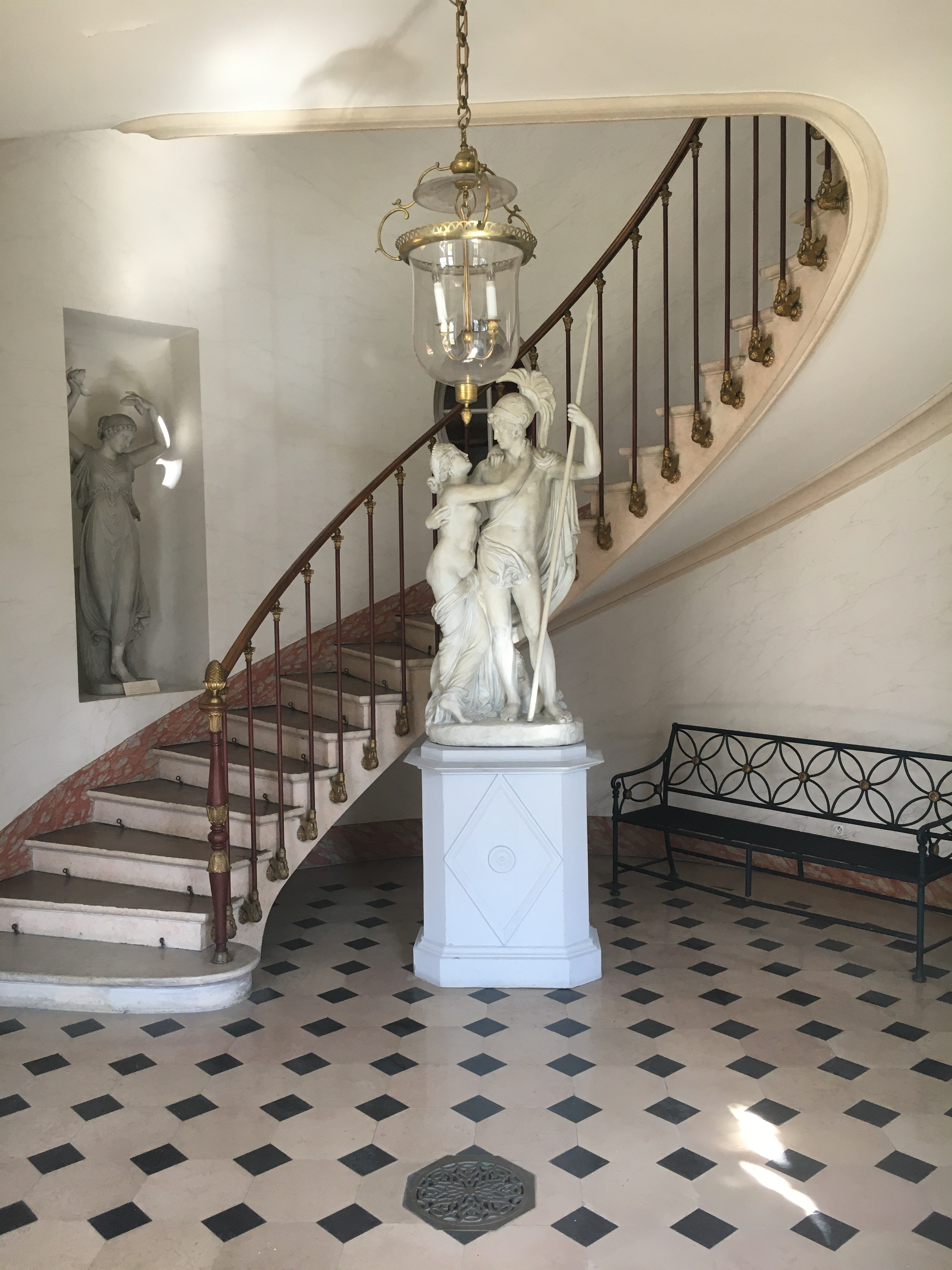
Vestibule of the library

The first librarian was Paul Fleuriot de Langle (1897–1968), Paul Marmottan's secretary, who established an initial classification of the books and wrote a guide to the collection that is still an authoritative reference. (Note: Paul Fleuriot de Langle, Bibliothèque Marmottan, guide analytique, Boulogne-sur-Seine, bibliothèque Marmottan, impr. Frazier-Soye, Paris, 1938, XVII-329 p.)

After his retirement, the library was neglected for several years before the Académie des beaux-arts appointed the art historian Bruno Foucart (1938–2018) as its scientific director in 1968. Foucart, who was in charge until the early 2010s, set up a regular purchasing programme and greatly expanded the collection devoted to the history of art in the first half of the 19th century.

In 1996, after major restoration and expansion work, the Académie des beaux-arts delegated the management of the bibliothèque Marmottan to the municipality of Boulogne-Billancourt. Now fitted with an auditorium that can host conferences and concerts, and more open to the public, the library is known for several exhibitions on the Napoleonic era, including "Tapis d'Empire" (2003), "Les Clémences de Napoléon" (2004) or, more recently, "Jeux d'Empire" (2017) and "De Joséphone à Eugénie : l'éventail au XIXe siècle" (2018).

=== Current status ===
The management delegation to the city of Boulogne-Billancourt ended in 2018, and the library has since been closed to the public during renovations. Since October 2020, it has been directed by the art historian and member of the Académie des beaux-arts Adrien Goetz.

== The collections ==
The vast majority of the bibliothèque Marmottan's collections are devoted to the First French Empire, which makes it, according to Bruno Foucart, "the largest Napoleonic library in Europe". While all aspects of the First French Empire are represented, books relating to its administration and administrators are undoubtedly one of the strong points of the collection. (Note: Paul Fleuriot de Langle, Notice sur la Bibliothèque napoléonienne Paul Marmottan et son fondateur (1856-1932), Boulogne-sur-Seine, 19, rue Salomon Reinach, [unknown date], p. 25.)

The history of the arts under the Empire and, more generally, thanks to the acquisition policy led by Bruno Foucart, that of the entire first half of the 19th century, constitutes the other dominant part of the collections. A section on the history and architecture of Paris has been expanded over the years, following the work of Paul Marmottan, a founding member of the Commission du Vieux Paris.

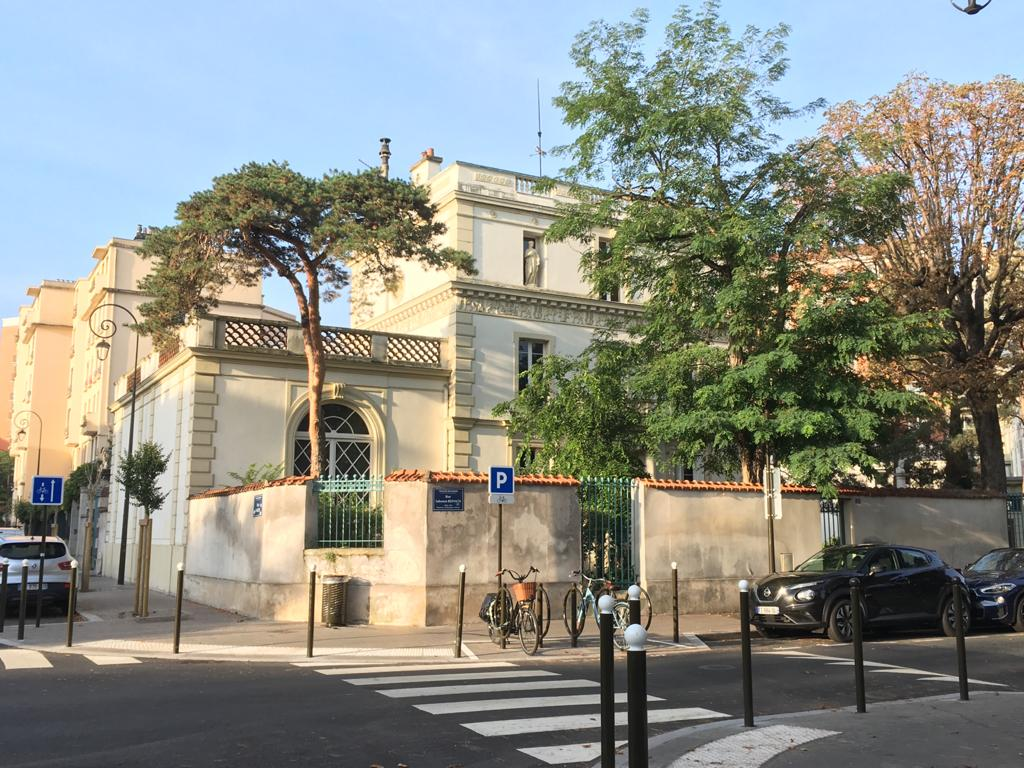
The library seen from Salomon-Reinach street

Since 1984, the bibliothèque Marmottan has been partially listed as a historical monument and was awarded the "Maison des Illustres" label in 2012.

== See also ==
- List of libraries in France
