= Alphonse Chigot =

French artist known for painting (1824–1917)

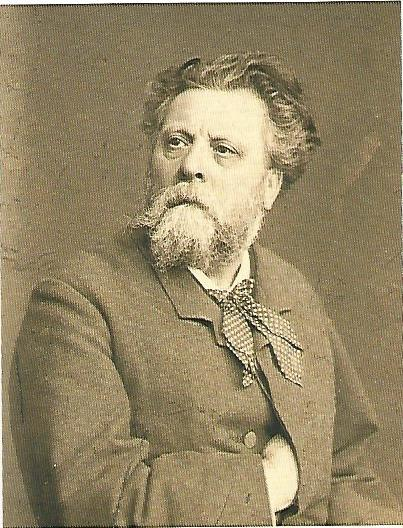
- Chigot around 1890
- Born: Alphonse Charles Chigot; 23 October 1824; Graçay, France
- Died: 8 October 1917 (aged 92); Valenciennes
- Known for: Oil painting, military painting
- Notable work: Le Duel, Le Salut a la Vierge, Armée de l'est
- Movement: Naturalism, military painting
- Awards: Légion d'honneur - Chevalier (Knight) (1904)

Alphonse Charles Chigot (French pronunciation: [alfɔ̃s ʃaʁl ʃiɡo]; 1824 – 1917) was a French historical painter and soldier, particularly associated with the city of Valenciennes where he had a studio for over sixty years. A former soldier in the French army he saw action in the first Franco-Moroccan War of 1844 and served until 1849. In 1853 he entered the Academies de Valenciennes to study art for three years. Chigot favoured military themed subjects and his works include large canvases such as le Duel and Le Salut a la Vierge, numerous portraits of soldiers and drawings and sketches of the Valenciennoise. He favoured epic subjects which he approached in an academic style, influenced by Neoclassicism and Romanticism. As a long-standing teacher of painting his pupils included his son Eugène Chigot, Charles Paris and Henri Le Sidaner, who painted him in 1881. Chigot first exhibited in provincial exhibitions and from 1877 until 1914 at the Salon of the Société des Artistes Français to which he was admitted in 1884.

== Early life and army service ==
Alphonse Chigot was born on 23 October 1824 in Graçay in the Cher department in the Centre-Val de Loire. He was the son of a soldier Jean Alexandre Chigot and Francoise Adele Chigot (née Martin). His father served in the armies of the Napoleonic Empire culminating in his participation at the Battle of Waterloo in 1815. Retired from the army his father was variously an inn keeper and an employee of the Administration des droits reunis (the agency charged with the collection of indirect taxes in France) and from 1852 the manager of a tobacco shop at Aulnoy-lez-Valenciennes.

The 18 year old Chigot enlisted in a regiment of Chasseurs à Pied, (light infantry) in 1842. It was a defining moment in his life. Many years after he had demobbed he was still wearing aspects of military uniform. Chigot served in Algeria with French forces under Governor-general Maréchal Bugeaud in 1844 and saw action in the Battle of Isly on 14 August 1844. The French forces routed a larger but poorly organised Moroccan force under Sultan Abd al-Rahman. Chigot performed bravely earning a citation and promotion to a higher non-commission post. He was also present at the recapture of the Marabout of Sidi Brahim, from Abdelkader El Djezairi's Algerian forces on 23 December 1847. As a painter Chigot would return to these years and paint academic Orientalist paintings. He remained fascinated all his life by ... scenes of the oriental life, the sparkling fantasies, the golden rocks scorched in the warm light... the red sunsets of the desert... After a successful career during which he reached the rank of sergeant, Chigot resigned from the army in October 1849.

== Artistic career ==
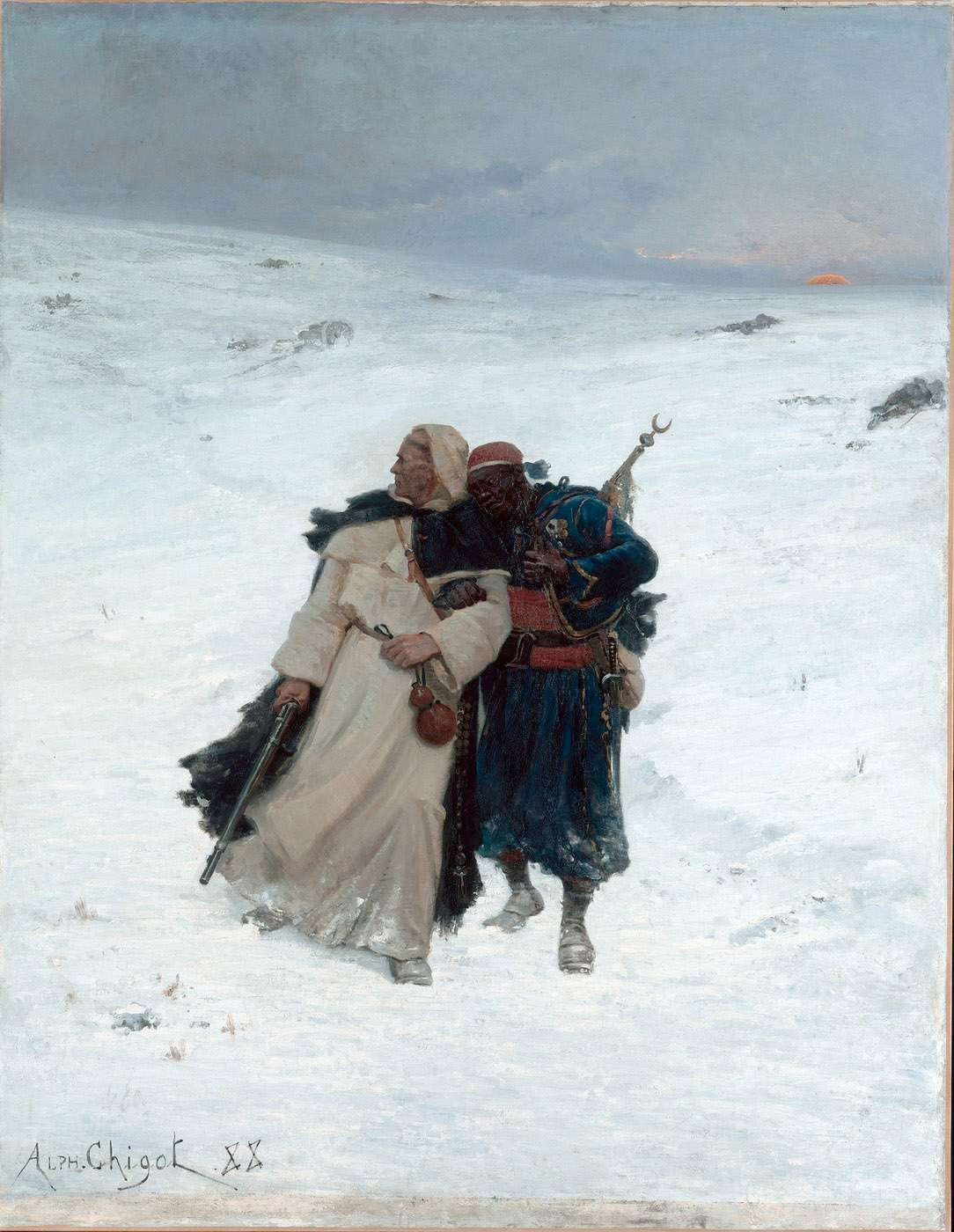

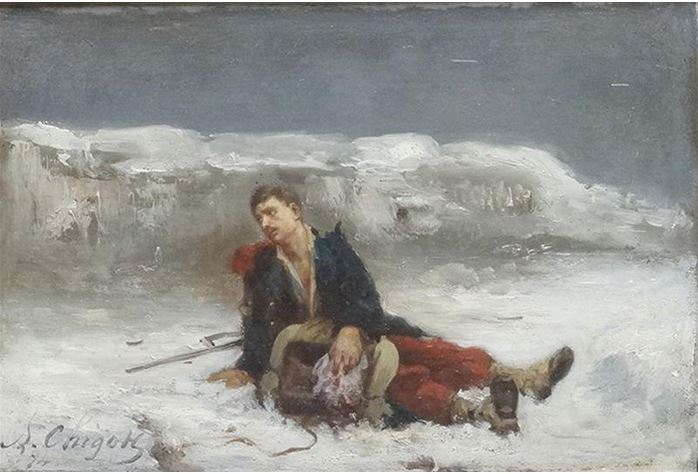

Initially he worked as an office clerk at a local refinery (sugar?) but he was not well suited to the work and in 1853 he enrolled at des Académies de Valenciennes, an institution with close links to École nationale supérieure des Beaux-Arts in Paris. Training was largely academic. He learnt technical skills in drawing and painting from Julien Potier and from Jules Leonard. Clearly a strong willed person he does not seem to have been much interested in classical art preferring en- plein air painting and military subjects in the academic style of Horace Vernet and Louis-Théodore Devilly. Chigot produced dozens of drawings, sketches, watercolours and paintings of soldiers in the period 1854 – 56. He was however, a good student who would later become professor of drawing and calligraphy at Notre Dame de Valienciennes college.

In 1855 he married Pauline Dubreuille (1825 -1910), a milliner with a successful business. The union produced six children including Eugène Chigot, the painter and Edouard, (1859–1919) who maintained the family expectations for boys and became a soldier. Three children did not survive four years of age including Paul, who died in the cholera epidemic of 1866. On his marriage, Chigot opened an atelier in Valenciennes and becomes a full-time artist. Particularly successful were his pochades (small pocket size paintings) of local characters that could be produced quickly and sold for a relatively cheap price. A few of these survive. In 1893 a collection of Chigot's pochades were assembled together and published.

Chigot's reputation rests on his military paintings. He drew inspiration by evoking memories of the combat theatres of Algeria in which he had served. He produced numerous paintings of soldiers from the conflict: the bugler sounding the charge at the Battle of Sidi – Brahim, the local Algerian Turcos troops who served with Chigot in North Africa, the zouaves, riflemen and cavalrymen are all painted time and again. His larger canvases are academic and epic in scope. They were commercially successful but little commented upon by art critics and historians and thus they are not well documented

The defeat of the French at Sedan in 1871 by the Prussians had a deep psychological effect on France. Chigot responded by painting some of his most eye catching and moving canvasses. In 1888 he produced a huge canvas entitled 1870-71 Armée de l’est now at the Musée d'Orsay . Displayed at the Salon in 1888 the critic Eugene Montrosier discussed the content of the painting ... As soon as you touch the military genre, one almost falls into sentimentality. This is what Mr. Chigot prevents, recalling a painful memory of the Eastern Army, which after glorious exploits took refuge in Switzerland. The scene is dismal. On a plain covered with snow, the sun is eerily yellow... A decorated Dominican supports the march of a wounded Turcos soldier, and carries the soldier’s gun, ready to use it to save the black child of Muhammad. …

In Soldat français blessé dans la neige, 1871 Chigot depicts a desperate wounded French soldier, unable to stand in the snow. The picture represents the defeat of France but also offers hope that she will rise again. Chigot's patriotic military paintings were popular with many French people, a fact that was recognised by the French Republic with an award of the Legion d'Honneur in 1904. His grandson, the surgeon Paul-Louis Chigot reminisced about a studio visit in 1913. Chigot junior recalled the smell of apples and a studio full of military memorabilia - from Arab drums on the floor, guns on the wall, to canvases of military life occupying every available wall space. The years that Chigot spent as a soldier were the great theme of his life and his work.

== The final years ==
Alphonse Chigot died at his house in Valenciennes on 8 October 1917, days before his 93rd birthday. At the time of his death the house was occupied by billeted German soldiers, who had taken Valenciennes during the Great War. His grandson Paul-Louis recalled that he died in his dress uniform from the Algerian War. His unwelcome guests were left to contemplate a final canvas that he was composing where the Prussians were fleeing at pace from the marauding French infantrymen.

== Biography ==
- Antoine Descheemaeker- Colle (2008), Eugène Chigot, Sa Vie, Son Oevre Peint, Editions Henri, France. ISBN 9782917698020 - opening chapters cover Alphonse Chigot's career.
- Benezit Dictionary of Artists entry on Alphonse Chigot
- Jean-Claude Poinsignon (2000), Le soldat-peintre Alphonse Chigot, in Valentiana no 25 – 26, 1er & 2eme trimestre

== Bibliography ==
- Joshua Taylor (1989), Nineteenth Century Theories of Art, pages 246–7, University of California Press, USA. ISBN 0520048881
- Malcolm Baker, Andrew Hemingway, Briony Fer et al., (2018) Art as Worldmaking: Critical Essays on Realism and Naturalism, University of Manchester, ISBN 9781526114907
- Pierre Brasme, La Moselle et ses artistes, Éd. Serpenoise, Metz, 2002, pp. 61–63 ISBN 2-87692-544-3
- Henri Claude, La Lorraine vue par les peintres, Serge Domini, Thionville, 2003, pp. 47–48, 106, 116 ISBN 2-912645-59-X
- Valentin Grivet (2020), French Painting: Franzosische Malerei, Pintura Francesa 1830–1920, Koenemann. ISBN 9783741929298
- Jean-François Lecaillon (2021), "The representation of the campaign of the armies of the Loire in French painting", Annales de Bretagne et des Pays de l’Ouest, Sorbonne University publication, 128-4, 159–177. https://journals.openedition.org/abpo/7275

== Gallery (selected) ==
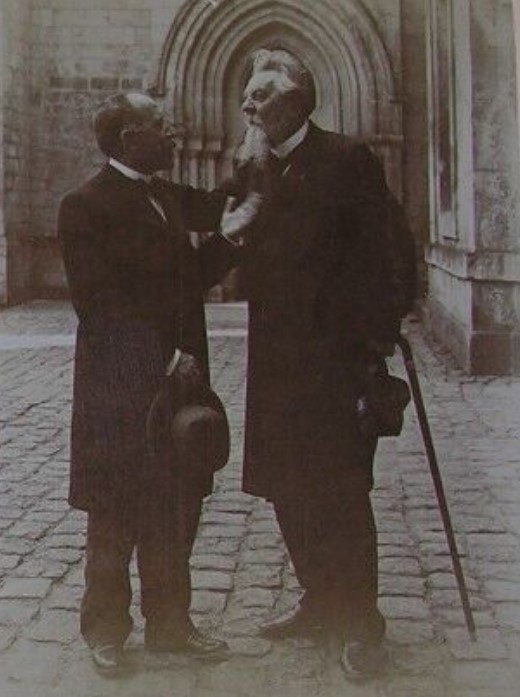
Alphonse Chigot with Commandant Caffier in 1905

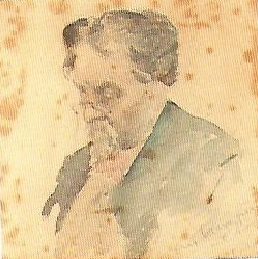

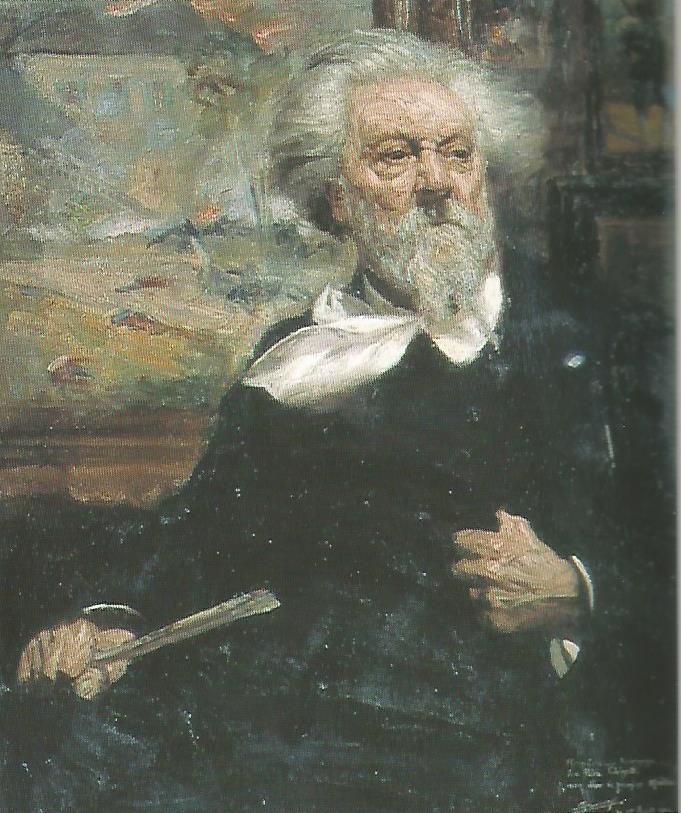

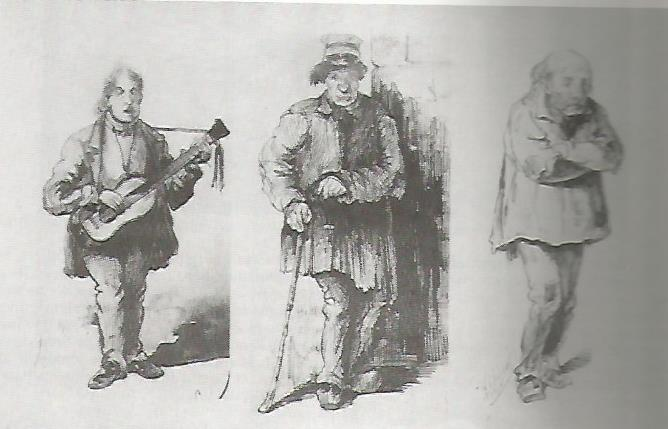

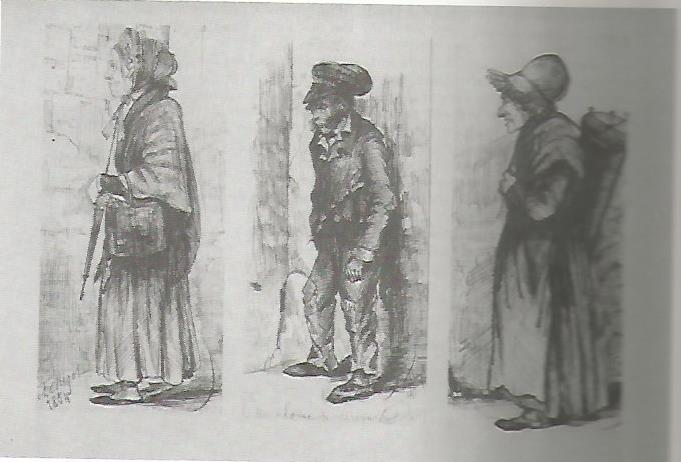

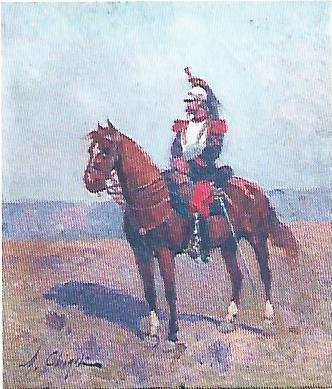

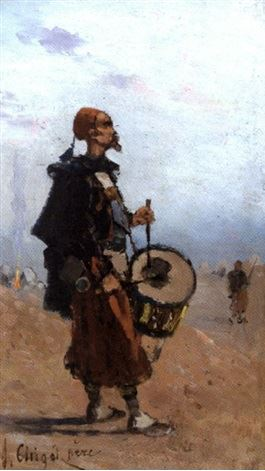

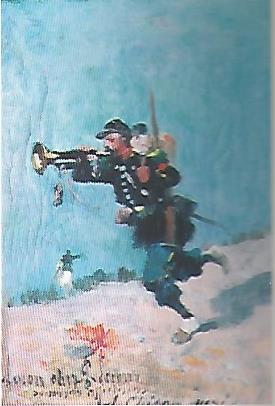

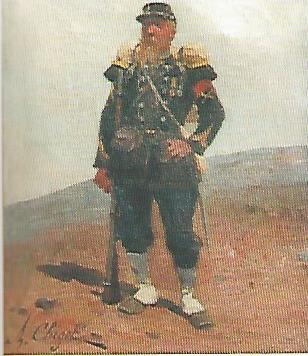

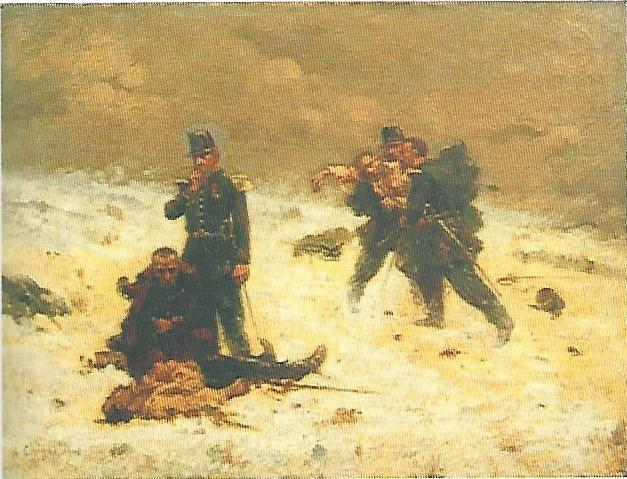

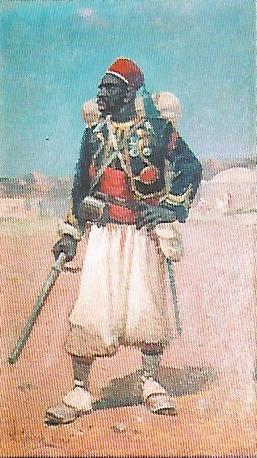

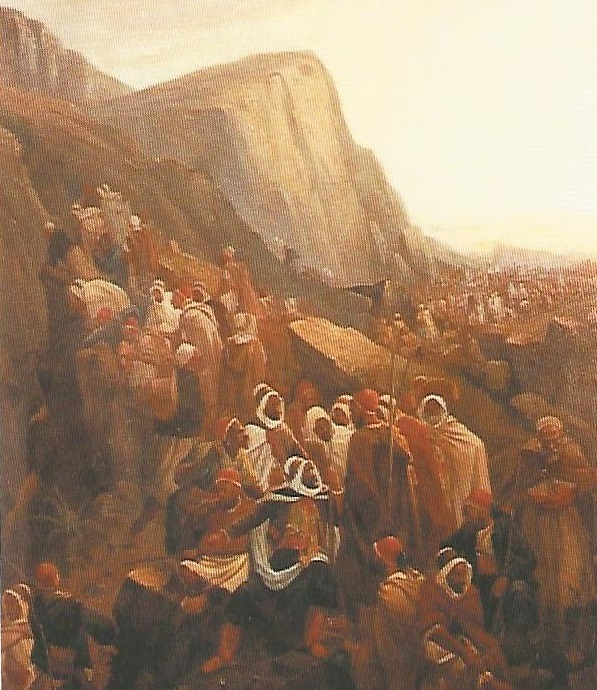

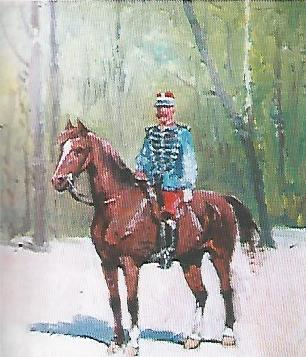

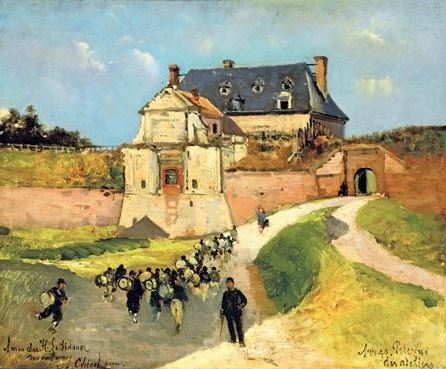

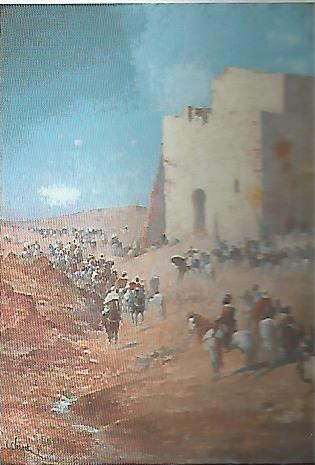

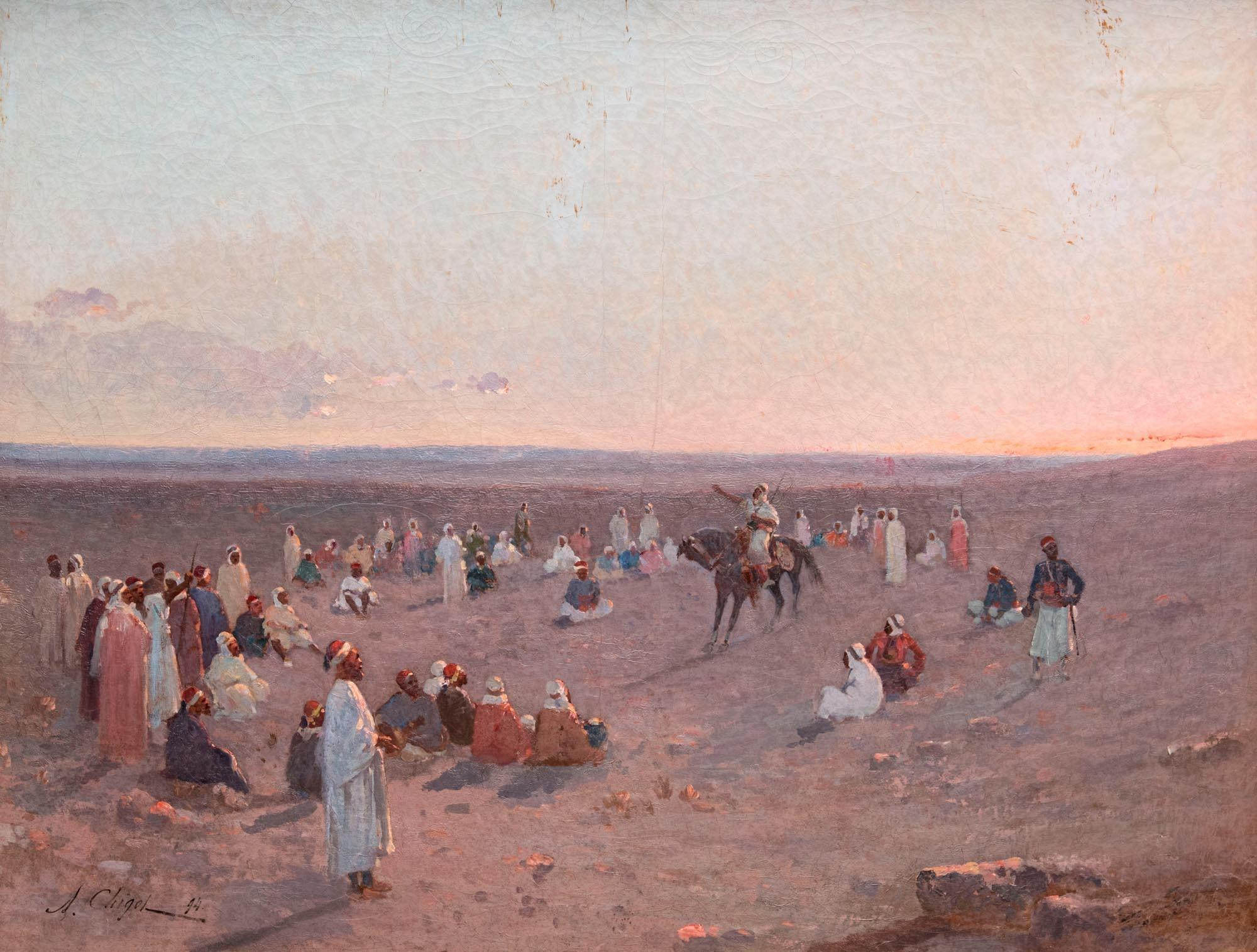

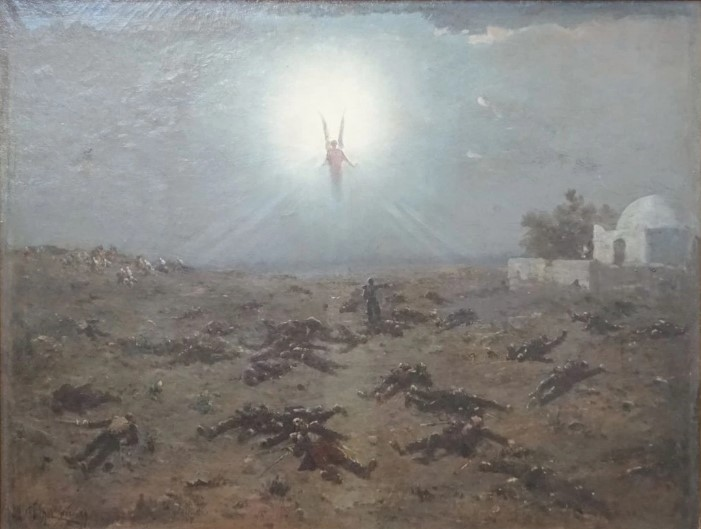

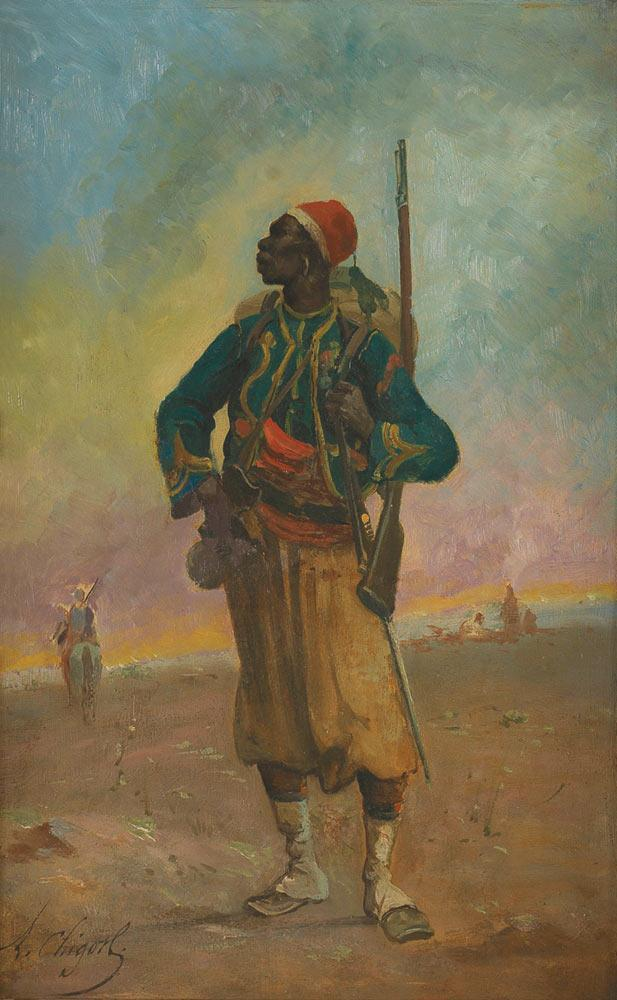

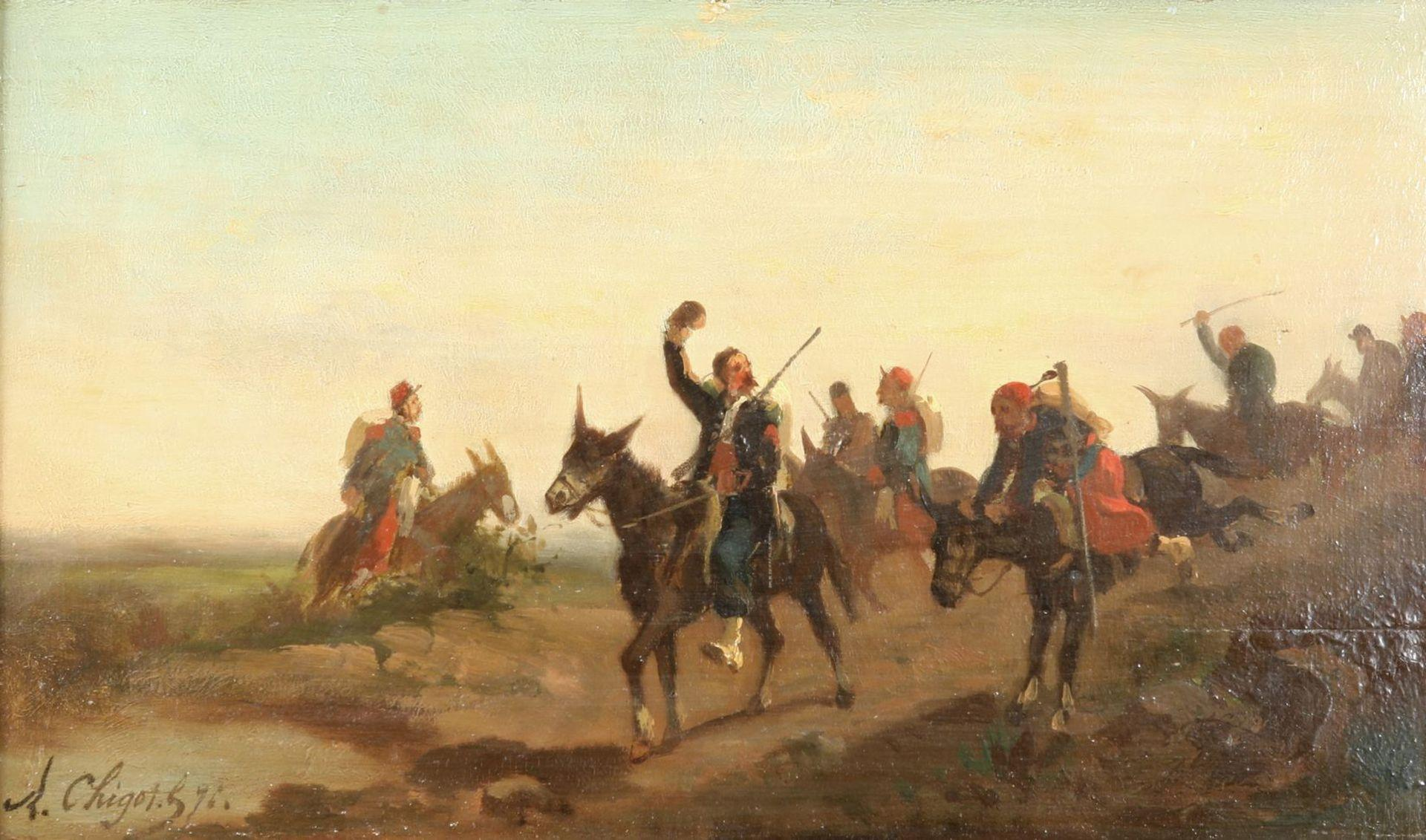

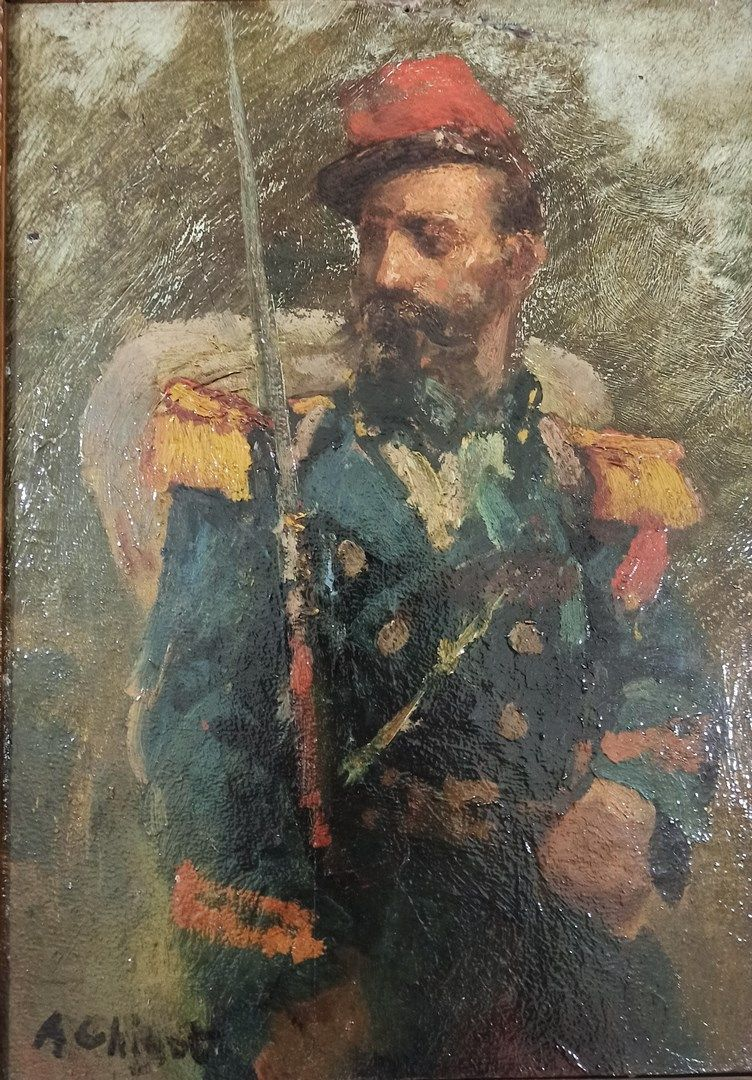

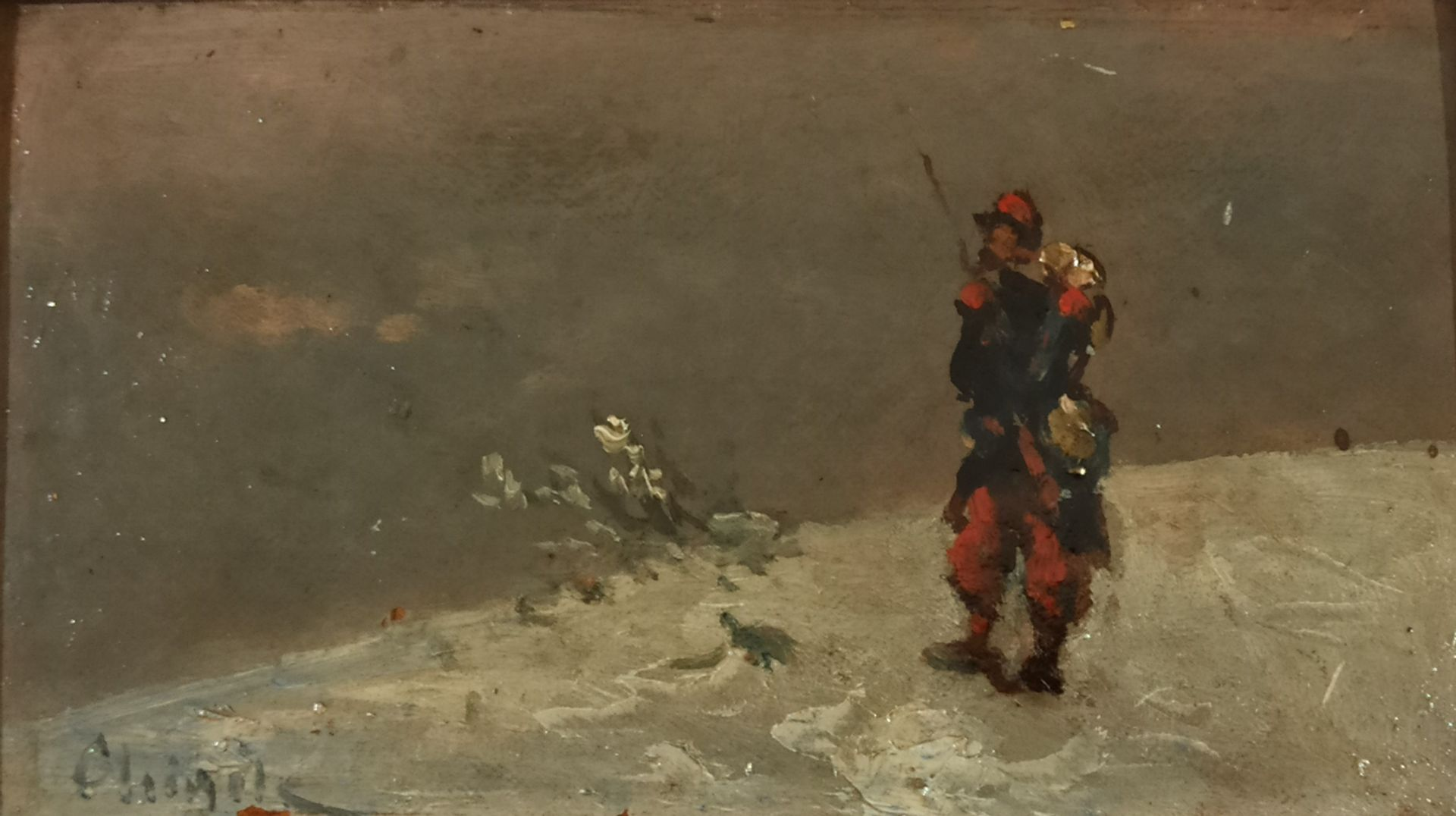

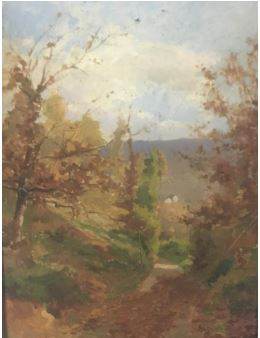
