= Maréchal =

Maréchal is the French equivalent of English Marshal. Maréchale is the feminine form mainly used to denote the wife of a marshal in France. It can also refer to:

== Military ranks ==
- Maréchal général des camps et armées du roi, former French distinction: Marshal General of the King's camps and armies
- Maréchal d'Empire, French military distinction
- Maréchal de France, French military distinction
- Maréchal-des-logis, French military rank
- Maréchal de camp, former French military rank

== People with the surname ==
- Ambrose Maréchal (1764–1828), archbishop of Baltimore, Maryland
- André Maréchal (1916–2007), French optician
- Charles-Laurent Maréchal (1801–1887), French painter, known for his stained glass windows
- Charles-Raphaël Maréchal (1818–1888), French painter, son of Charles-Laurent Maréchal
- Guillaume le Maréchal (1146–1219), English soldier and statesman
- Joseph Maréchal (1878–1944), Belgian Jesuit
- Leopoldo Marechal (1900–1970), Argentine poet, novelist and critic
- Marion Maréchal (b. 1989), French politician
- Maurice Maréchal (1892–1964), French cellist
- Pierre Maréchal (1915–1949), British engineer and race driver
- Sylvain Maréchal (1750–1803), French essayist, poet, philosopher and political theorist

== Other ==
- À la Maréchale, method of food preparation in classical French cuisine
- La Maréchale, Kate Booth (1858–1955), English evangelist who extended the Salvation Army into France and Switzerland
- Marechal, a village and electoral district in Rodrigues, Mauritius
