= Pochade =

A pochade (from French poche, pocket) is a type of sketch used in painting. As opposed to a croquis, which is line art, a pochade captures the colors and atmosphere of a scene.

Generally, pochades use a small, portable format. Robert Henri and James Wilson Morrice, for example, painted such sketches on small wood panels that would fit in a coat pocket along with oil paint tubes. Others artists, such as landscape painter John Constable, made pochades the size of the intended painting. The French artist Alphonse Chigot produced a series of pochades of the towns people of Valenciennes that he sold from his studio which were later collected and published in two volumes.

== Literature ==
In literature, this term is used to describe a generally burlesque work, short and written quickly. It seems to be first attested in 1800 with this meaning which links it to "pochard" and "poissard", vulgar and burlesque characters of vaudeville.
