= Louis-Théodore Devilly =

French painter

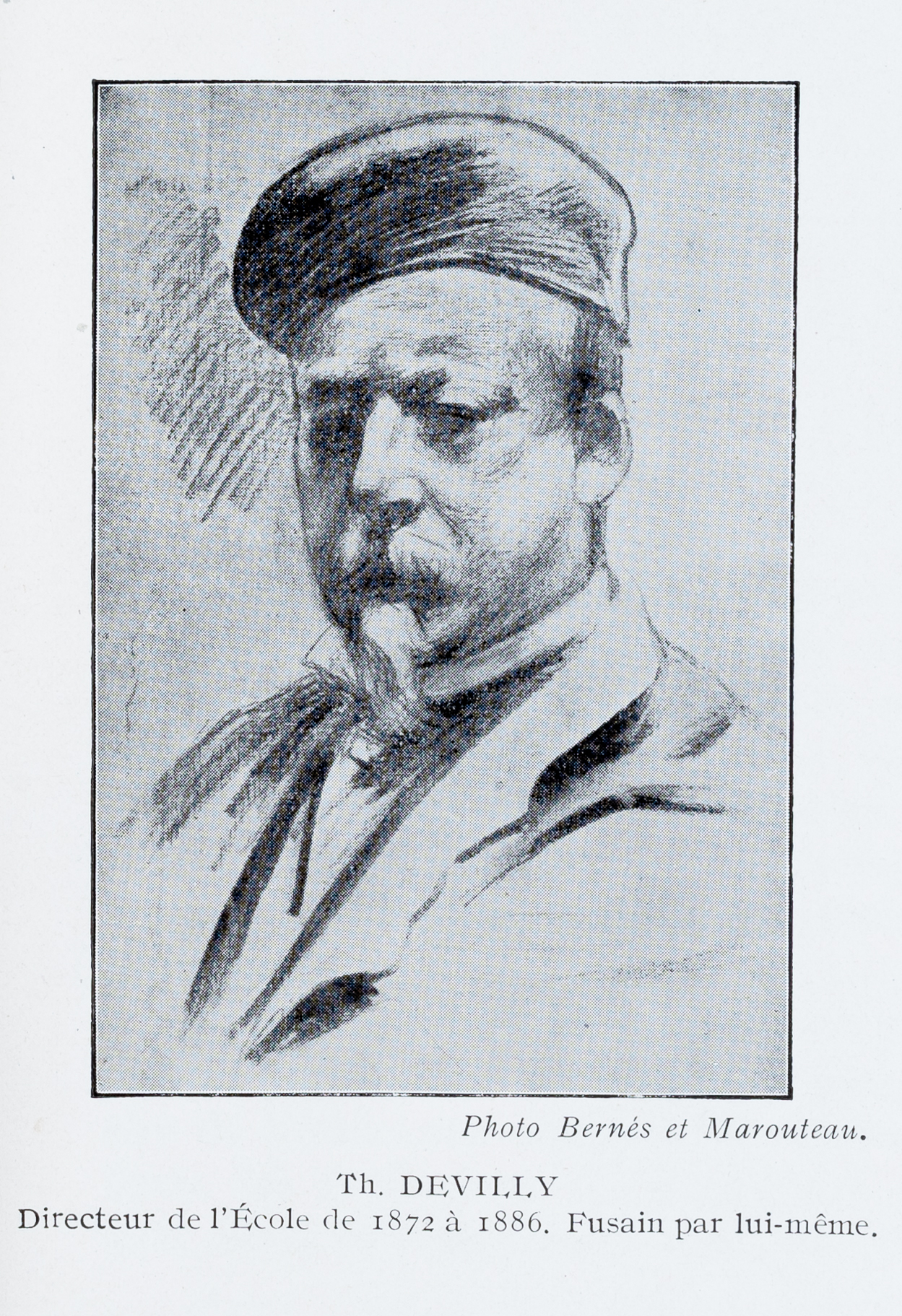
Self-Portrait

Louis-Théodore Devilly (28 October 1818, Metz – 24 December 1886, Nancy) was a French painter who specialized in military and Orientalist scenes; associated with the École de Metz.

== Biography ==
He came from a family of booksellers. His father, Louis-Jean-Baptiste (1792-1826), was a member of the Académie nationale de Metz and a prominent Mason. Following his father's death, his mother, Félicité Constance Gentil, took over the bookshop, but he was more attracted to drawing and sketching.

From 1833 to 1835, he attended classes taught by Laurent-Charles Maréchal, the founder of the École de Metz. He then went to Paris, where he became a student of Paul Delaroche at the École des beaux-arts de Paris. In addition to oil painting, he practiced engraving and worked with watercolors. In 1840, he exhibited at the Salon.

He returned to Metz in 1841, but continued to exhibit in Paris; winning a silver medal at the Salon of 1852. He became especially well known for his huge canvases of historical scenes; mostly battles. In 1864, he was named Director of the École supérieure d’art de Metz

Following the Franco-Prussian War, he remained loyal to France and moved away from Metz, which had become part of the German Empire. He settled in Nancy and took over management of the École nationale supérieure d'art de Nancy, a post he held until his death in 1886.
