= Eugène Chigot =

French painter (1860–1923)

- Born: Eugène Henri Alexandre Chigot; 22 November 1860; Valenciennes, France
- Died: 14 July 1923 (aged 62); Paris, France
- Education: École nationale supérieure des Beaux-Arts
- Known for: Oil painting, Watercolours
- Notable work: Verrotières dans la baie,Fraipont, Juan-les-Pins.
- Movement: Naturalism, Post impressionism,
- Awards: Légion d'honneur - Chevalier (Knight) (1895); Legion d’honneur – Officier (Officer) (1912)

Eugène Henri Alexandre Chigot (French: [øʒɛn ɑ̃ʁi alɛksɑ̃dʁ ʃiɡo]; 22 November 1860 – 14 July 1923) was a French post-impressionist painter. A pupil of his father, the military painter Alphonse Chigot, in 1881 he entered the internationally renowned École des Beaux-Arts in Paris where he was exposed to the ideas of the realist movement of the Barbizon School and to Impressionism. He settled in Étaples in the Pas-de-Calais in an artists’ colony, later returning to Paris where he became a founder of the Salon d’Automne. An official military painter he painted a series of canvases in Calais and Nieuwpoort recording the destruction caused by the First World War. Chigot's reputation was built on his maritime and landscape paintings that arose from his affinity to Flanders and the Pas-de-Calais. He recorded the lives of the people of Flanders placing them within a landscape of soft opalescent light. As a result of his experiences as a Great War artist his later paintings show traces of expressionism and a more vibrant pallette. He was also a nocturne painter who travelled extensively within France, Italy and Spain.

== Early years ==
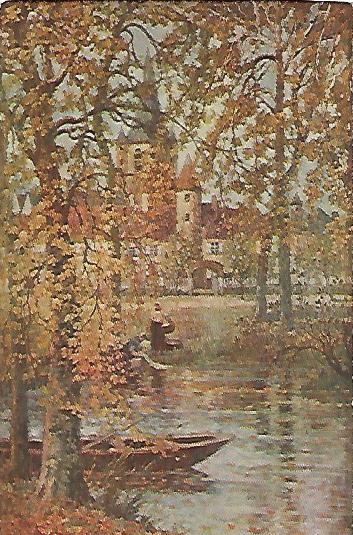
Moulins-Engilbert (1916), oil painting, 123 x 81 cm.

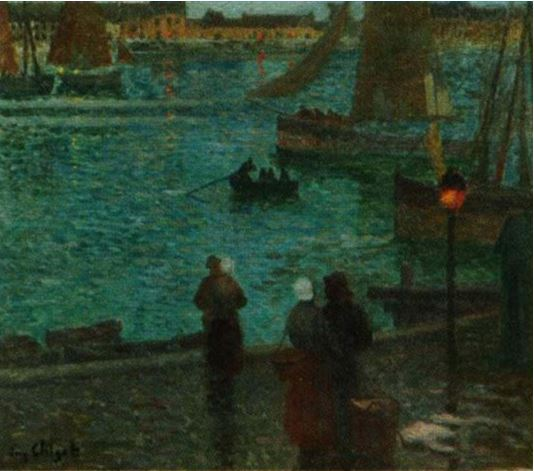
Eugène Chigot, Douarnenez, retour des pêcheurs, à la nuit tombante, (1903)

Eugène Chigot was born in Valenciennes in French Flanders on 22 November 1860, the fourth child of six of Alphonse Chigot (1824–1917) and Pauline Chigot (née Dubreuil) (1825–1910). His father was a former soldier and war artist who had served in the North African campaigns of the 1840s and later studied art in Valenciennes under Julien Potier. Eugène attended the Collège et Lycée Notre Dame des Dunes in Dunkerque where he met and befriended Henri Le Sidaner, who was to become a lifelong friend and supporter. His initial art training was as a pupil with his father Alphonse who operated an atelier in Valenciennes. His father was not initially supportive of his son becoming a full-time artist but acquiesced to his son's wishes upon the intervention of his artist colleague Alfred Philippe Roll (1846–1919), a former pupil of Léon Bonnat. In 1880, Chigot joined the atelier of Alexandre Cabanel and from 1881 until 1886 he attended the prestigious École des Beaux-Arts, where he studied under Bonnat, Paul Vayson and Cabanel. The latter's influence on the young Chigot was considerable. Although Cabanel mainly painted in an academic style that was dismissed derisively as L'art pompier (literally ‘Fireman art’) by some critics, he was a skilled painter with a deep knowledge of nineteenth-century French art, in particular impressionism and the naturalism of the Barbizon School from which Jean-Baptiste-Camille Corot and Charles-François Daubigny were significant influences on Chigot. Chigot's interests in the use of colour, softness of form and in atmospheric weather were formed under Cabanel's tutelage.

== The Colonie artistique d'Étaples ==
Following his pupillage in Paris, Chigot searched for an appropriate environment from where he could paint. Initially he travelled to the south of France and to Italy. At this stage in his career Chigot favoured ‘En plein air’ painting, a theory credited to Pierre-Henri de Valenciennes (1750–1819) that he expounded in a treatise entitled Reflections and Advice to a Student on Painting, Particularly on Landscape (1800) developing the concept of landscape portraiture by which the artist paints directly onto canvas in situ within the landscape. It enabled the artist to better capture the changing details of weather and light.

Eugène Chigot began exhibiting at the Paris Salon in 1884 and continued to do so until 1924. He was commended by the jury in 1885 for Portrait des Artistes Français, before winning a third class medal in 1887 for La pêche interrompre and a second-class medal in 1890 for the maritime painting Prière du soir. These successes came with a monetary award which funded a stay in Spain in 1887. He then joined his long-term friend Henri Le Sidaner at Étaples on the Opal Coast, south of Calais (Note: It was whilst painting in 1911 that Édouard Lévêque, a painter from Le Touquet and a representative of the École d'Étaples came up with the notion of giving the area around Le Touquet-Paris-Plage, the somewhat enigmatic name Côte d'Opale (Opal Coast)) where they established an artists’ workshop and regular exhibitions that eventually developed into a school of art, called the Villa des Roses. Étaples had a tradition of en plein air painting established by Charles-François Daubigny (1817–1878), who retreated there from the outbreak of the Paris Commune in 1871, and by the local Deauville painter Eugène Boudin (1824–1898). In the period until the start of World War I in 1914 the area attracted numerous artists from abroad particularly the United States, Australia and the British Isles.

Chigot lived in the area for most of the next twenty years initially at the villa attached to his studio in Étaples. In 1892, he decided he decided to organize a painting exhibition under the patronage of Léon Bourgeois, Minister of Public Instruction and Fine Arts. It was held from the first Sunday in August to October 10in at the new town hall in Étaples. The exhibition assembled the works of over fifty artists mainly from the Étaples school of painters that included: Joseph Bail, Pierre Billet, Eugène Boudin , Georges Cain , Adrien Demont , Henri Duhem and Marie Duhem , Georges Maroniez, Albert Siffait de Moncourt, Francis Tattegrain, his old tutor Paul Vayson, as well as the sculptors Marie Fresnaye de Marenla and Édouard Lormier. The 1892 exhibition was accompanied by other cultural festivities and gave a tremendous boost to the Étaples colony and to Chigot as a leading light. Subsequently, this exhibition was held at Paris-Plage. In 1893 he married Martha Colle in Lille and spent part of his honeymoon in Berck, a favoured haunt of the impressionist painter Manet.Two years later, he bought a house in the new and wealthy resort of Le Touquet. The union produced a son, Paul Louis, born in 1906, who became an eminent decorated surgeon; and a daughter, Mathilde. The Chigots moved again in 1902 to the western Flanders town of Gravelines at the mouth of the river Aa where he built a chalet by the sea in which to paint. Chigot's output during the 1890s was of a post impressionistic style, in which he depicted beach scenes with expansive skies, atmospheric seascapes, and local châteaux often with a pond in the foreground. His figures are often local working people, intimately painted and placed within the coastal landscape. Chigot possessed the ability to paint still and moving water.

== Return to Paris and the Salon d’Automne ==
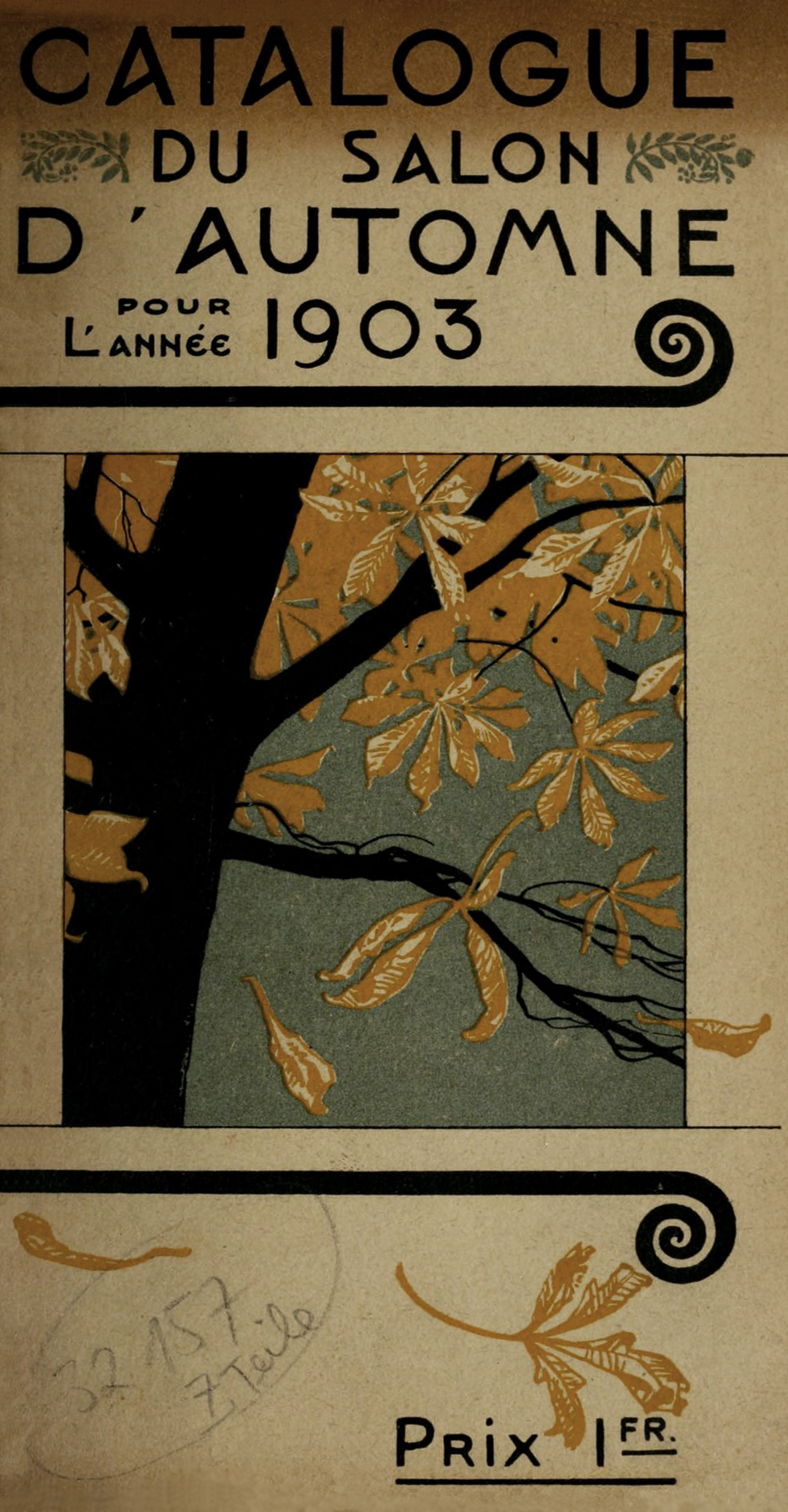
Salon d'Automne catologue 1903

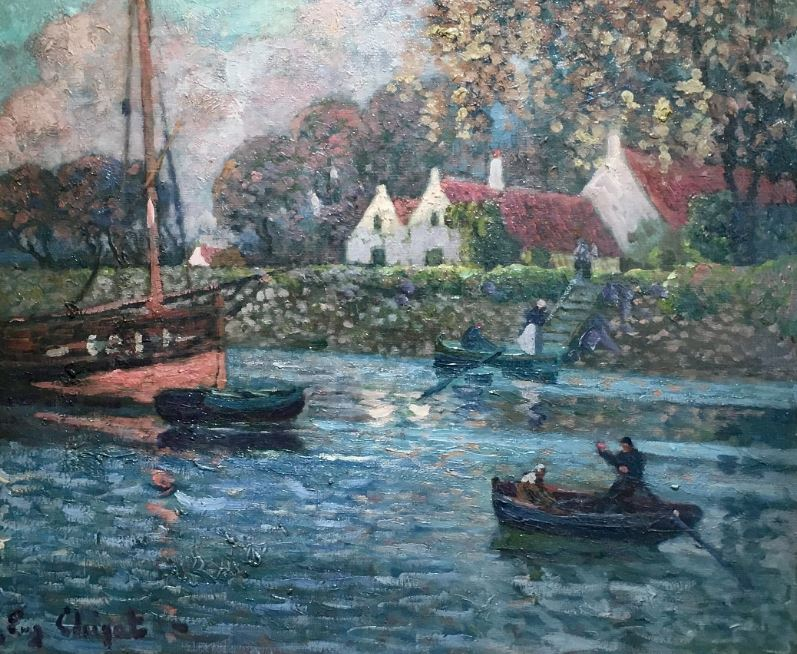
Fraiport (1905)

Eugène Chigot was an active participant in the founding of the Salon d'Automne, now an annual art exhibition held in Paris, which opened on 31 October 1903. Perceived as a reaction against the conservative policies of the official Paris Salon, the new exhibition was an immediate success showcasing developments and innovations in early-20th-century art. The Salon d’Automne from its inception received strong support from artists across the artistic spectrum including some of the most established artists in France that included: Paul Cézanne, Édouard Vuillard and Auguste Rodin who featured works at the inaugural exhibition. At the 1905 exhibition Chigot exhibited three canvases featuring the Flanders landscape: Le Soir à Vormouth, Place morte, Jardin en Flanders. The salon also witnessed the birth of Fauvism in 1905 and of Cubism in 1910. (Note: The Cubist contribution to the 1912 Salon d'Automne created scandal regarding the use of government owned buildings, including the Grand Palais, to exhibit such artwork. The indignation of the politician Jean Pierre Philippe Lampué made the front page of Le Journal, 5 October 1912. The controversy then spread to the Municipal Council of Paris, leading to a debate in the Chambre des Députés about the use of public funds to provide the venue for controversial art. The Cubists were defended by the Socialist deputy, Marcel Sembat.)

The febrile artistic atmosphere of the later Belle Époque undoubtedly influenced Eugène Chigot, who was based in Paris from 1908. Whilst Chigot could not be seen as a radical painter it is possible to see a second period in his work from 1905 to 1923 where he has incorporated elements of modernist movements especially in the use of colour which becomes more vibrant and expressionistic. During this second period, Chigot painted the landscapes of different regions of France and northern Italy travelling extensively throughout his artistic. Whilst he continued to be inspired by the light and landscapes of Flanders he painted at Versailles, Normandy, Brittany and Ile de France in the north and in Clisson and in the forests of Nivernais. The intense light and exuberant colours of the Côte d'Azur and in Liguria notably at Dolceacqua were subjects in his latter career.

== Peintre officiel de la Marine and war artist ==
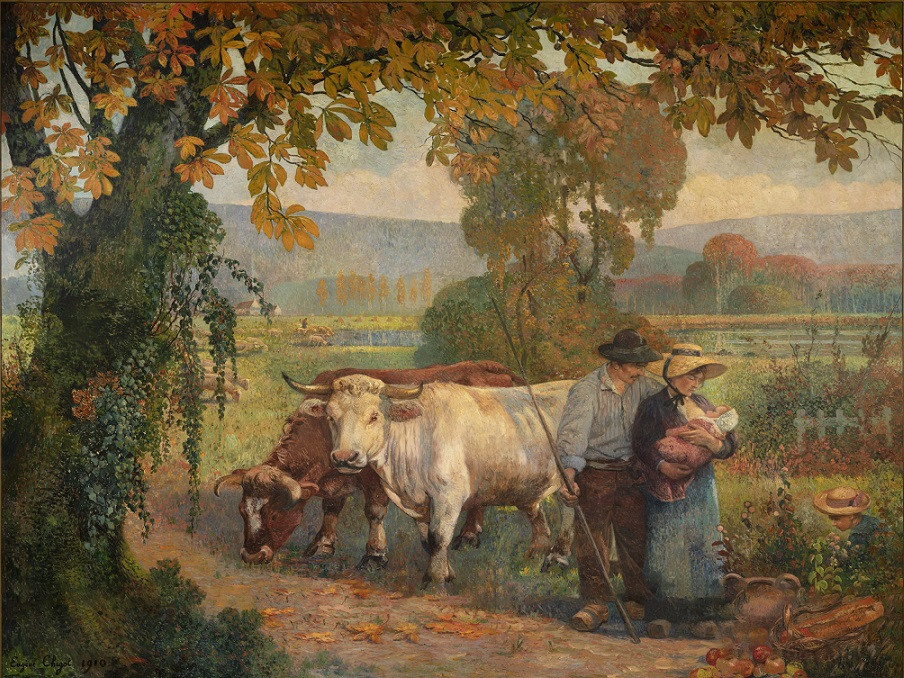
Eugène Chigot Pax (1910), oil painting hanging in Peace Palace in The Hague, Netherlands

In 1891 Chigot accepted the offer to become an official painter for the Marine Nationale (Peintre officiel de la Marine). The position necessitated a series of official paintings to commemorate notable events including the Kronstadt–Toulon naval visits. In 1893 Chigot completed a number of official paintings to mark President Émile Loubet's visit to the French fleet at Toulon and that of the Russian Admiral Theodor Avellan's visit to Toulon. Then in 1897 he was commissioned by President Felix Faure to capture the moment when Faure left France to meet the Russian Tzar and sign the Franco-Russian Alliance. In 1913 Chigot's large canvas Pax was donated by the French government to hang in the newly founded Permanent Court of Arbitration at the Peace Palace in The Hague.

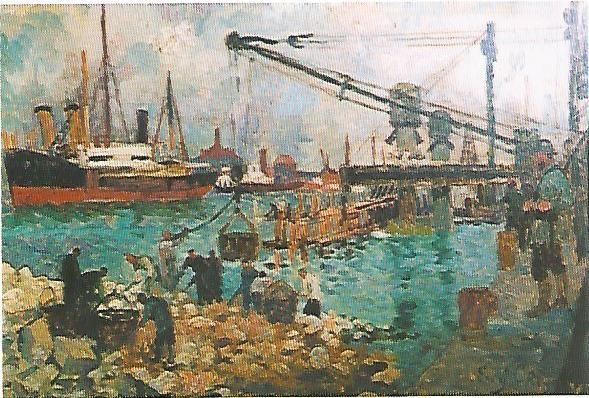
Le port de Calais (1917), oil, on canvas

The disruption to French cultural life of the Great War was severe and within a short period many artists were struggling financially. In response, art critic Louis Vauxcelles organised an Exposition at George Petit's Gallery in Paris, to which Chigot contributed a painting, with the profits going to the relief of artists. At the Exposition La Triennial in 1916 he contributes four paintings : La rue fleurie à Menton, Solitude au Grand Trianon, Printemps en Flandre, la Mortola Italie. On a tangible level the war had a deleterious effect on Chigot. His father Alphonse, was behind enemy lines after the fall of Valenciennes to the Germany army. As a consequence, Chigot was unable to visit his father during his final illness in October 1917. In the previous month he had moved his family to Dieppe to keep them away from the front line.

In 1917, in his capacity as an official government artist, Chigot was approached to join the French forces at Calais where he helped organise a morale boosting exhibition of Great War art. Chigot was an official war painter appointed by the French Ministry of Marine, recording the destruction of WWI in Calais and Nieuwpoort. He recorded war damaged Calais, in a series of drawings and paintings, some of which have been lost. One major canvas Le Port de Calais (1917) has survived and shows a group of, heroically posed dockers, purposefully repairing the destroyed dock in Calais. At Nieuport on the River Yser, he witnessed first hand the effects of the bombardment on the town and created a series of stark drawings and paintings of the destruction. These years where he witnessed horrendous destruction changed his painting from the pastoral impressionism on which his reputation was largely based to a more sombre Realism. There were psychological effects that left him in a depressed state. He and his wife embarked on a long vacation on the Côte d'Azur, where paintings such as Juan-les-Pins (1919), displayed a vibrant pallette and expressionist tendencies. He was re elected to the committee of the Salon d'Autumn in 1919 and in 1920 he had paintings exhibited at the Metropolitan Museum in New York, in an exhibition that toured some of the major galleries of the United States.

Eugène Chigot died in Paris on 14 July 1923. His body was returned to Valenciennes and buried beside other members of his family at the Saint-Roch cemetery (Cimetière Saint-Roch). In attendance were his lifetime friends Le Sidaner and the sculptor Félix-Alexandre Desruelles who had produced a bronze bust of Chigot in 1887.

== Public collections (selected) ==
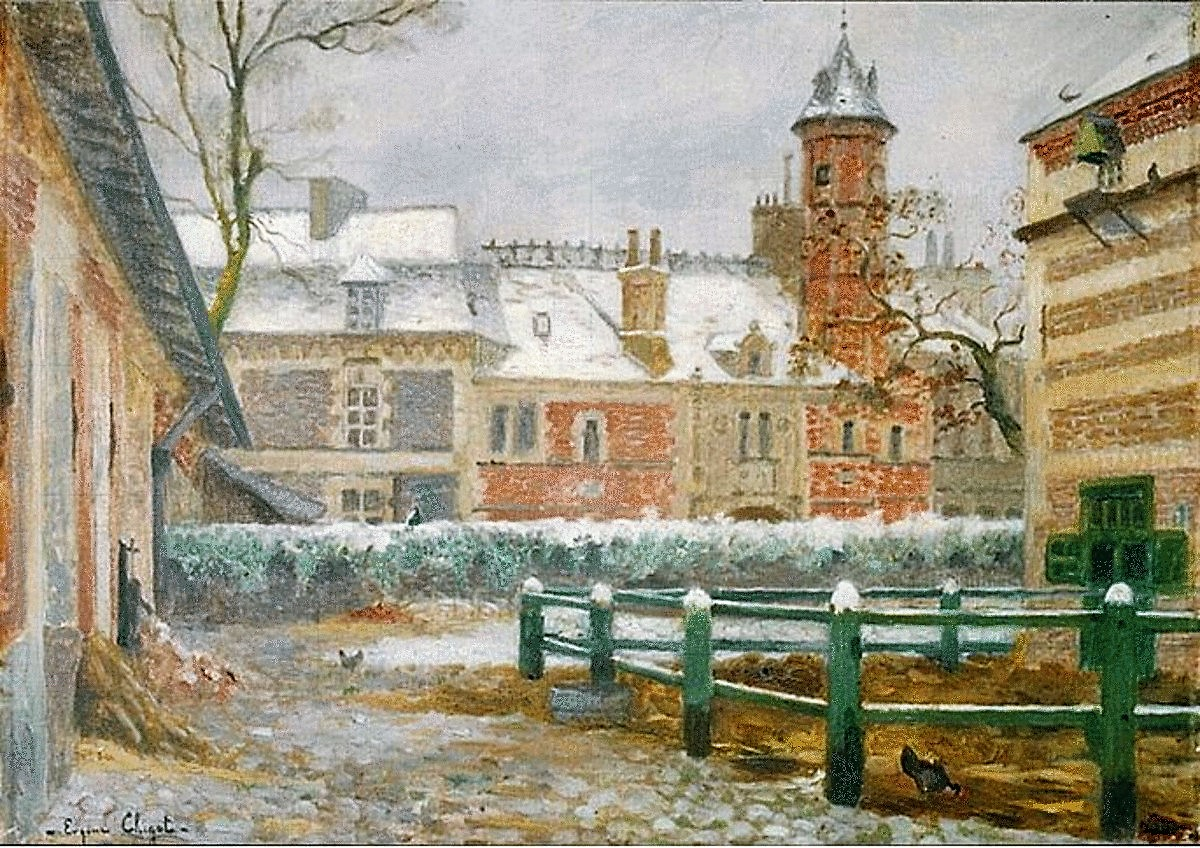

Examples of Chigot's work can be found at : Musée d'Orsay, Musée de France d'Opale Sud, Musée Antoine Vivenel, Musée du Touquet-Paris-Plage, Palais des Beaux-Arts de LillePetit Palais, Musée Carnavalet, Musée de Nantes, and Indianapolis Museum of Art.

Chigot has been the subject of several posthumous exhibitions (selected): at the Musée Galliera in 1954, at the Hôtel de Ville de Calais in 1960, the Salon d' Automne, Paris in 1960, the Kaplan Gallery, London in 1964 and in le Touquet at the Musée du Touquet in 2008. On the centenary of his death in 2023 the Maison du Port départemental d'Etaples-sur-mer and the Musée de la marine d'Etaples-sur-mer organized the exhibition "Eugène Chigot, Peintre de la Côte d'Opale" commemorating his work in the local area.

The Association des Amis d' Eugène Chigot in Touquet maintains his legacy.

== Biography ==
- Antoine Descheemaeker- Colle (2008), Eugène Chigot, Sa Vie, Son Oevre Peint, Editions Henri, France. ISBN 9782917698020 in French
- Jean-Francoise Louis Merlet (1910), Eugène Chigot, peintre, Paris Societè de L’edition Libre.
- Eugène Chigot, exhibition catalogue, musée Galliera, Paris, 1954.

== Bibliography ==
- Jean-Claude Lesage /Lionel François: ‘L'École d'Étaples. Une foyer artistique à la fin du XIXe siècle’ in Revue du Louvre, no. 3, p. 57, periodical, Paris, June 2001
- Edith Marcq (2019), La Côte d'Opale et ses peintres au XIX ème siècle à la fin de l'entre-deux-guerres: l'individualité de son appellation à ses diverses représentations picturales, in french.
- Camille Mauclair (2019), Henri Le Sidaner, The Obolus Press, ISBN 978-0981178035
- Joshua Taylor (1989), Nineteenth Century Theories of Art, pages 246–7, University of California Press, USA. ISBN 0520048881
- J Turner, (2000). From Monet to Cézanne: Late 19th-century French Artists. Grove Art. New York: St Martin's Press. ISBN 0312229712 - background only.
- Malcolm Baker, Andrew Hemingway, Briony Fer et al., (2018) Art as Worldmaking: Critical Essays on Realism and Naturalism, University of Manchester, ISBN 9781526114907

== Gallery (selected) ==
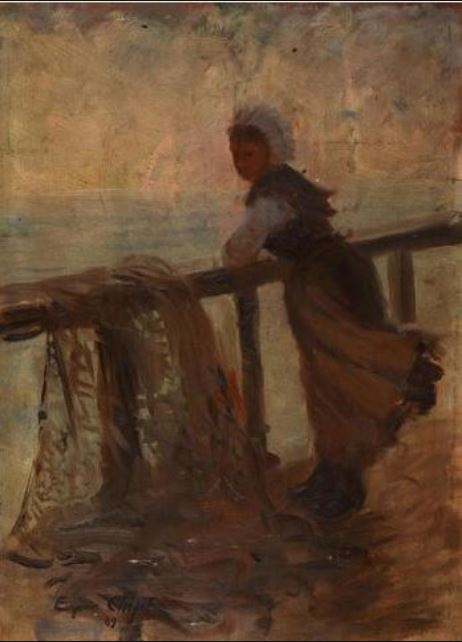

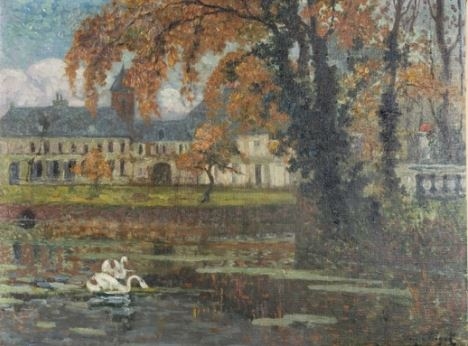

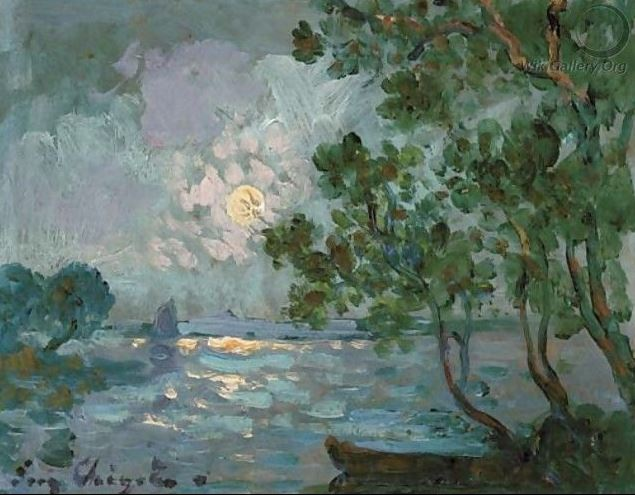

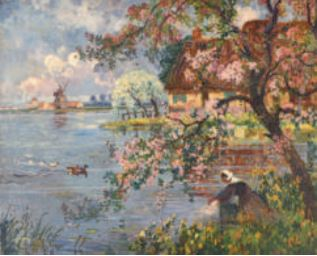

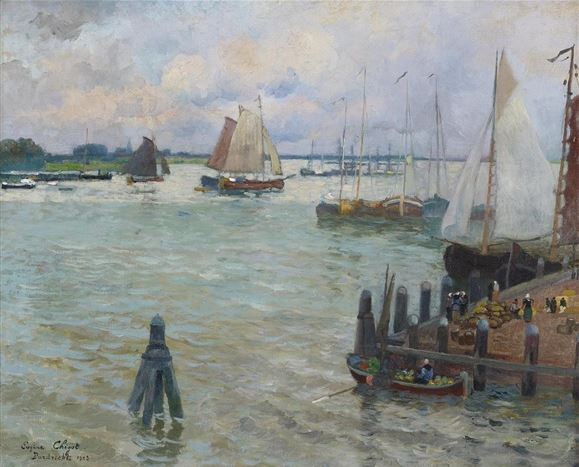

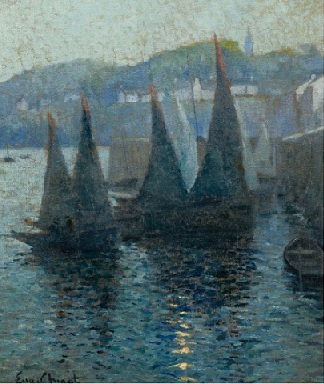

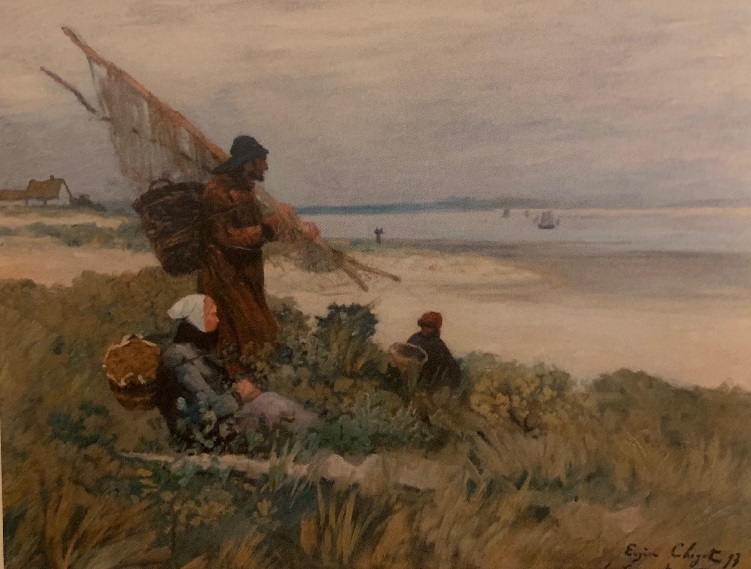

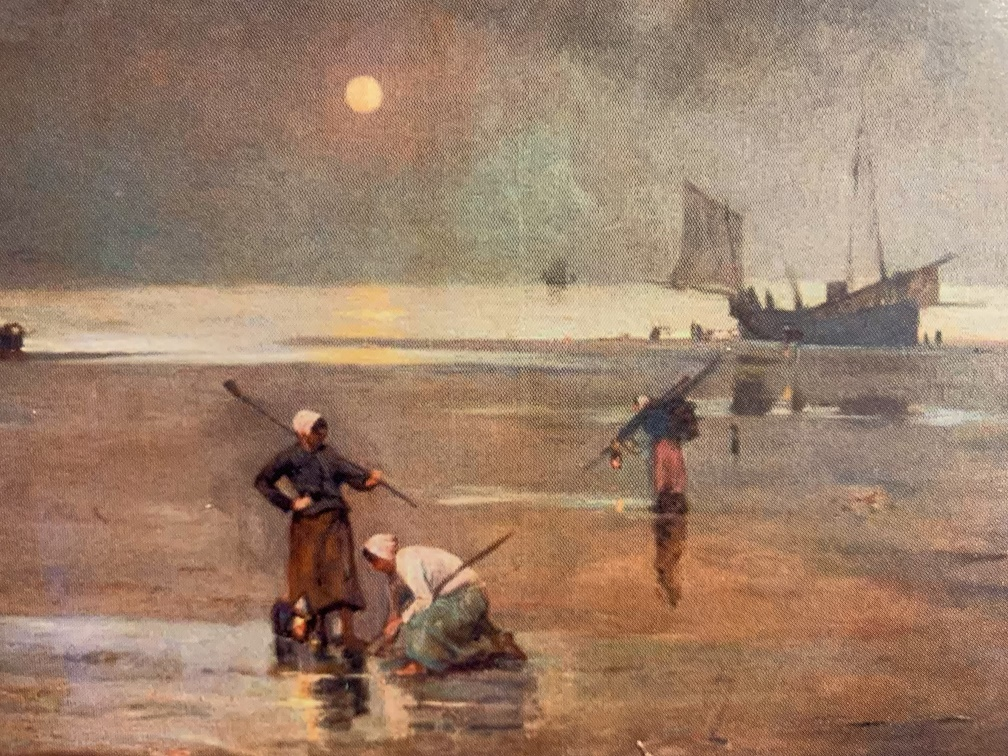

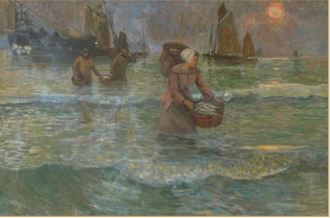

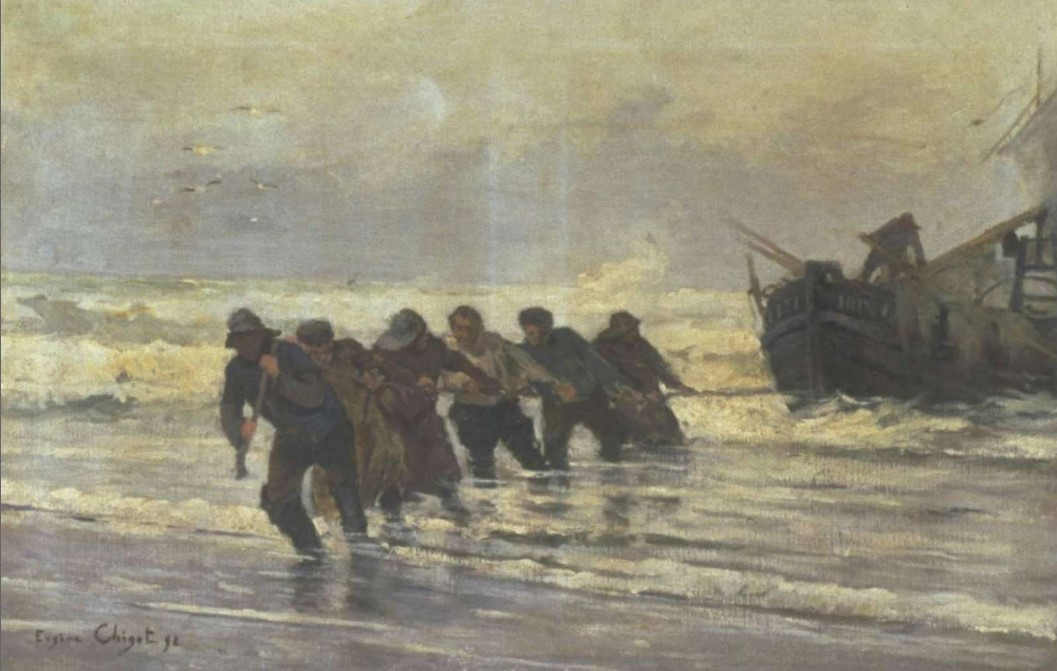

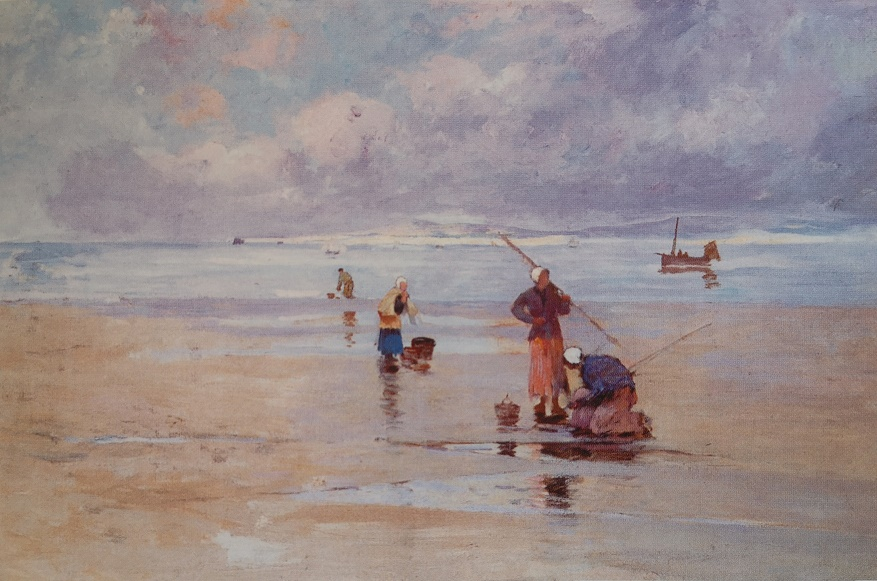

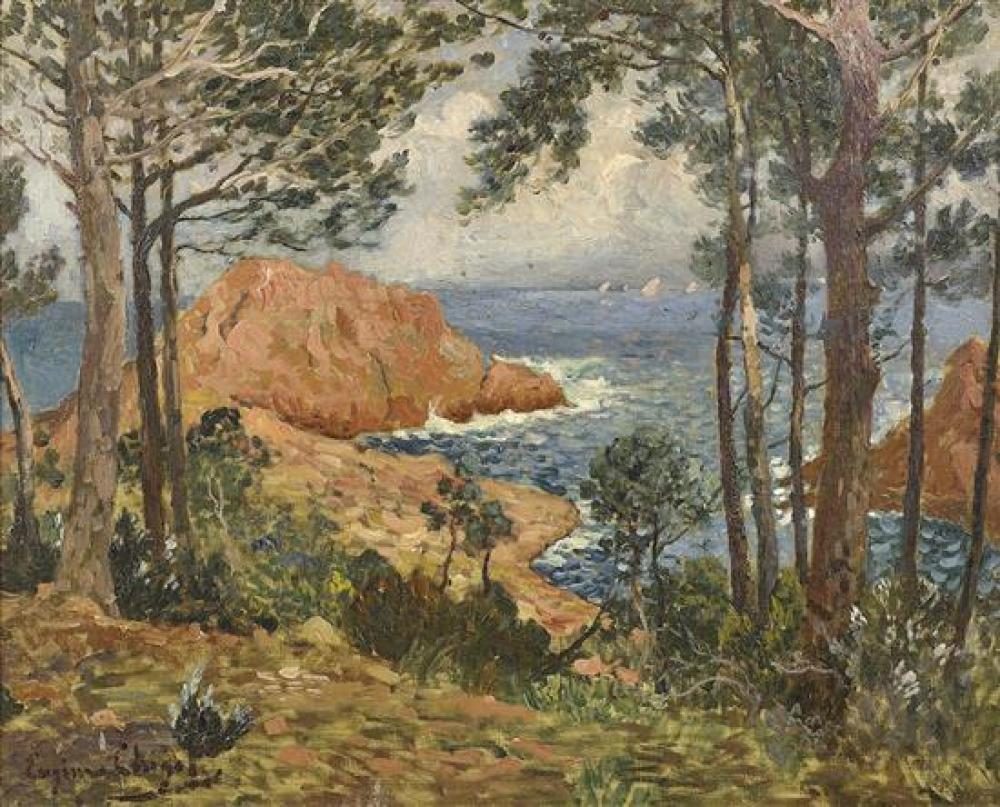

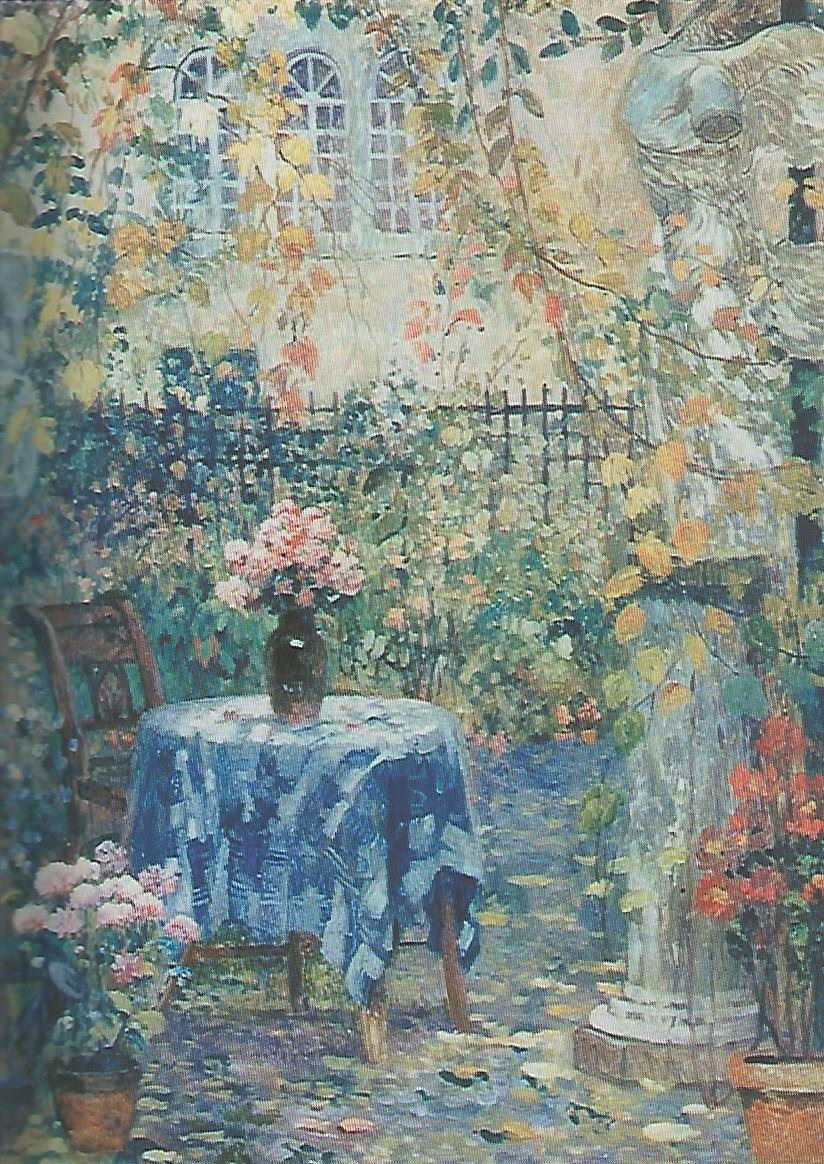

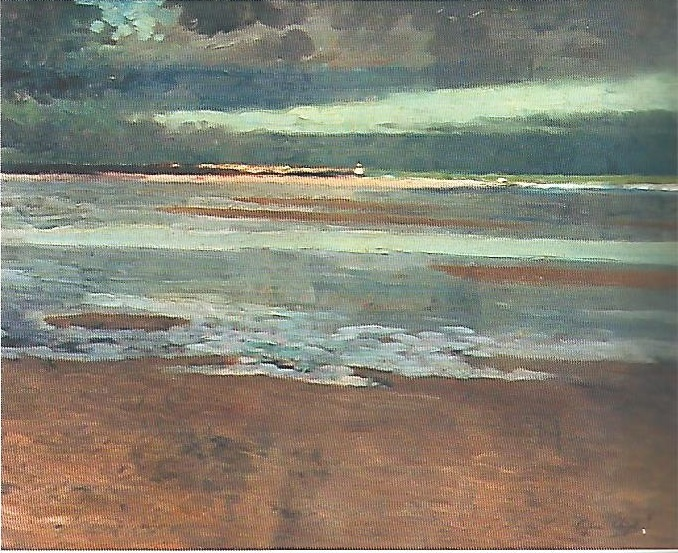

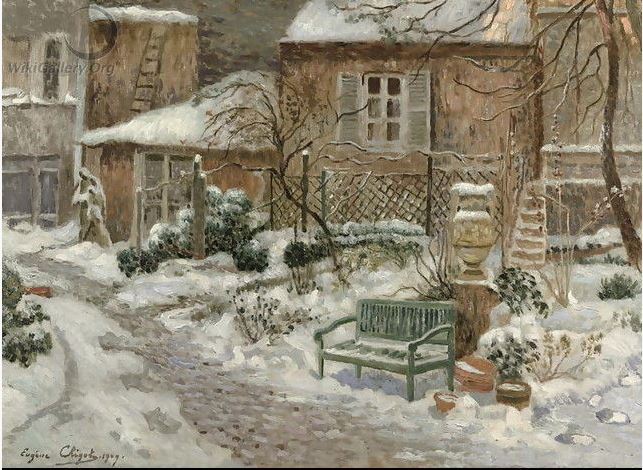

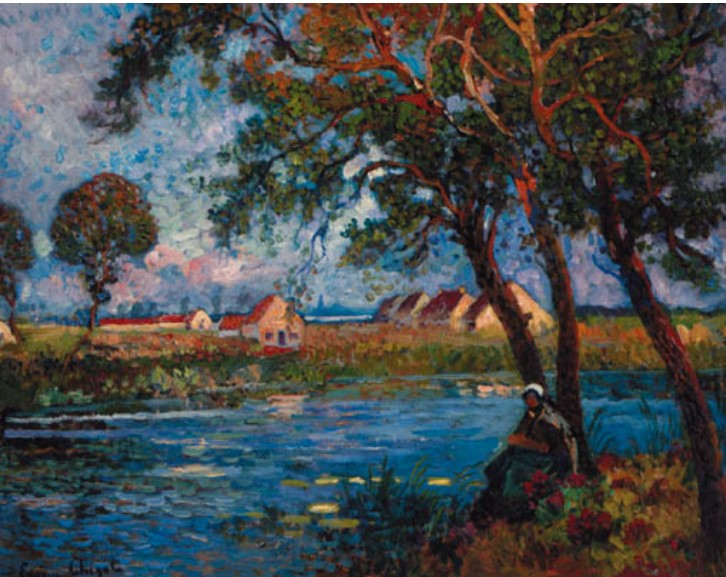

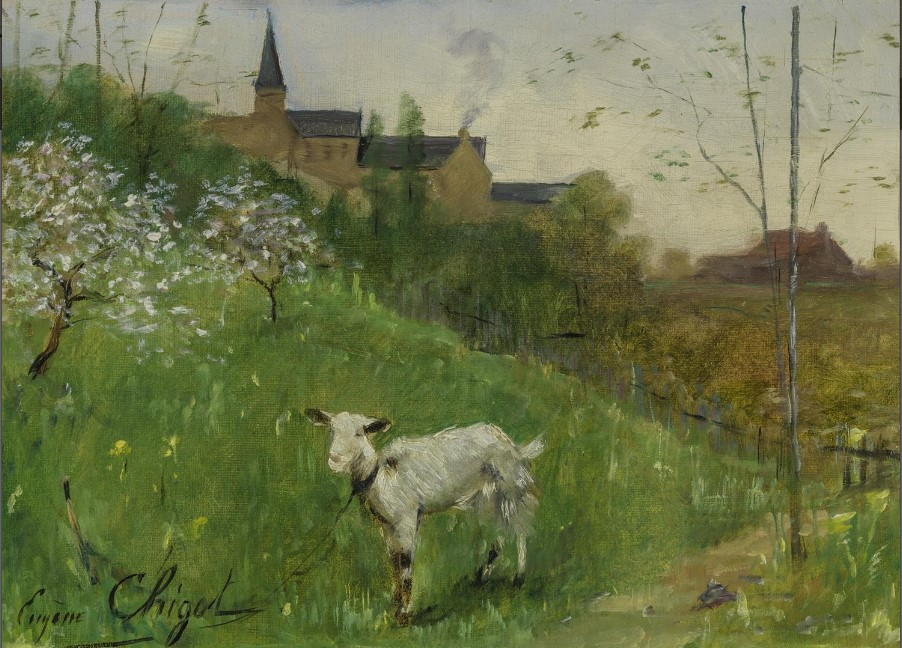

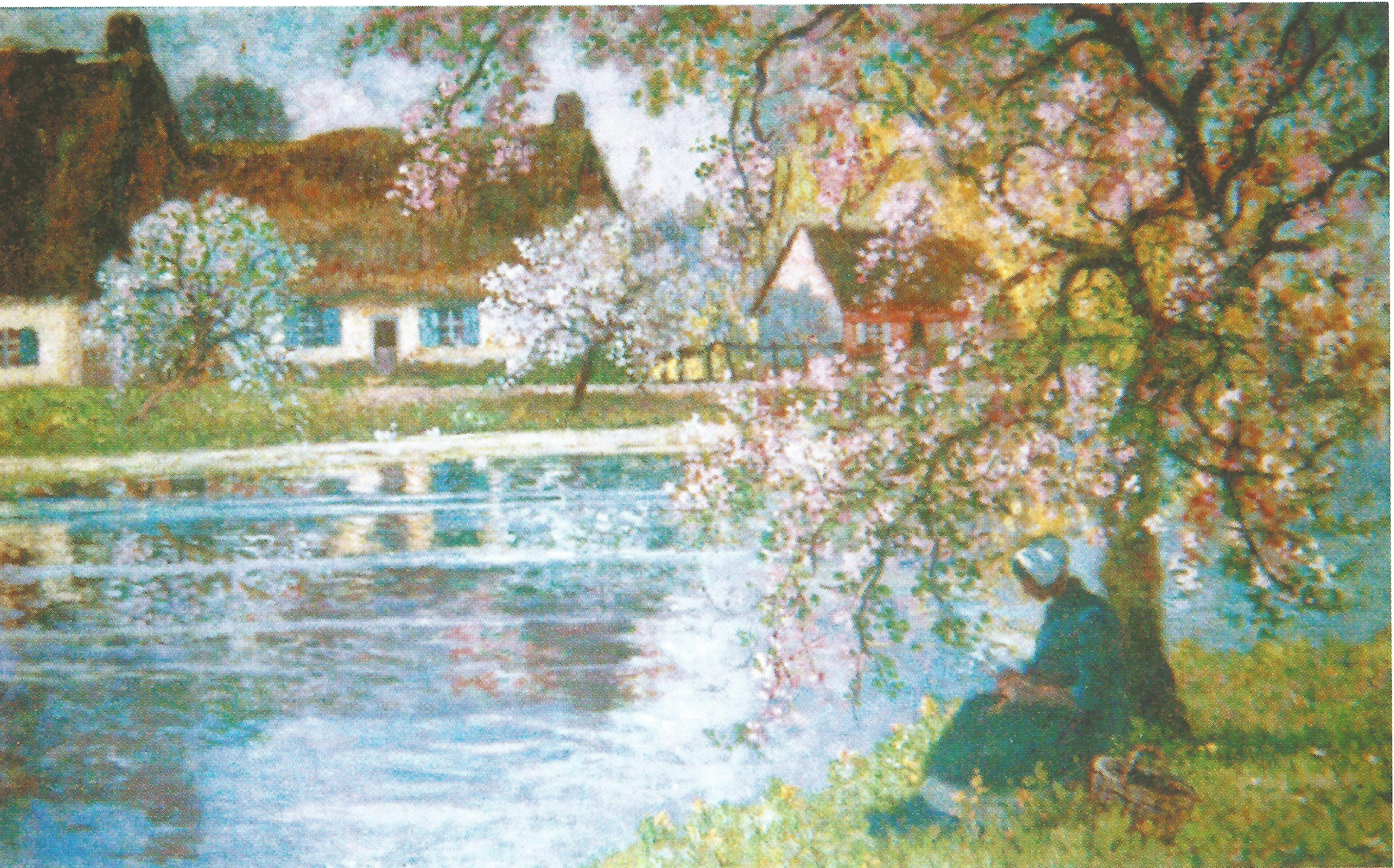

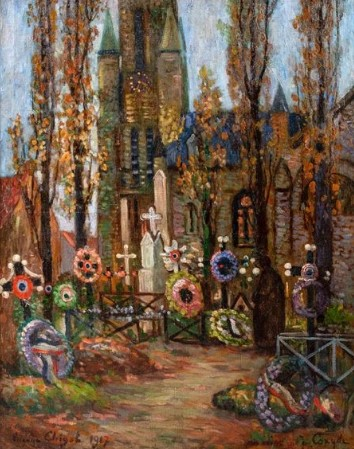

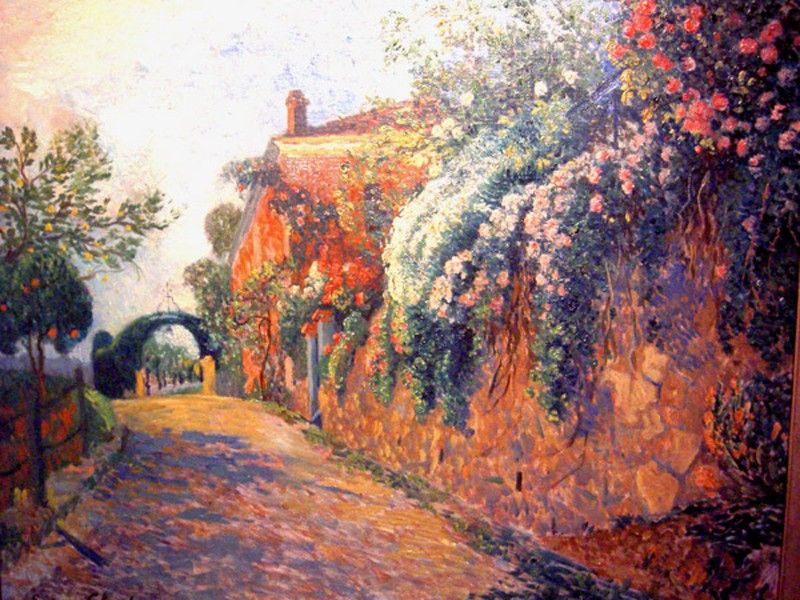

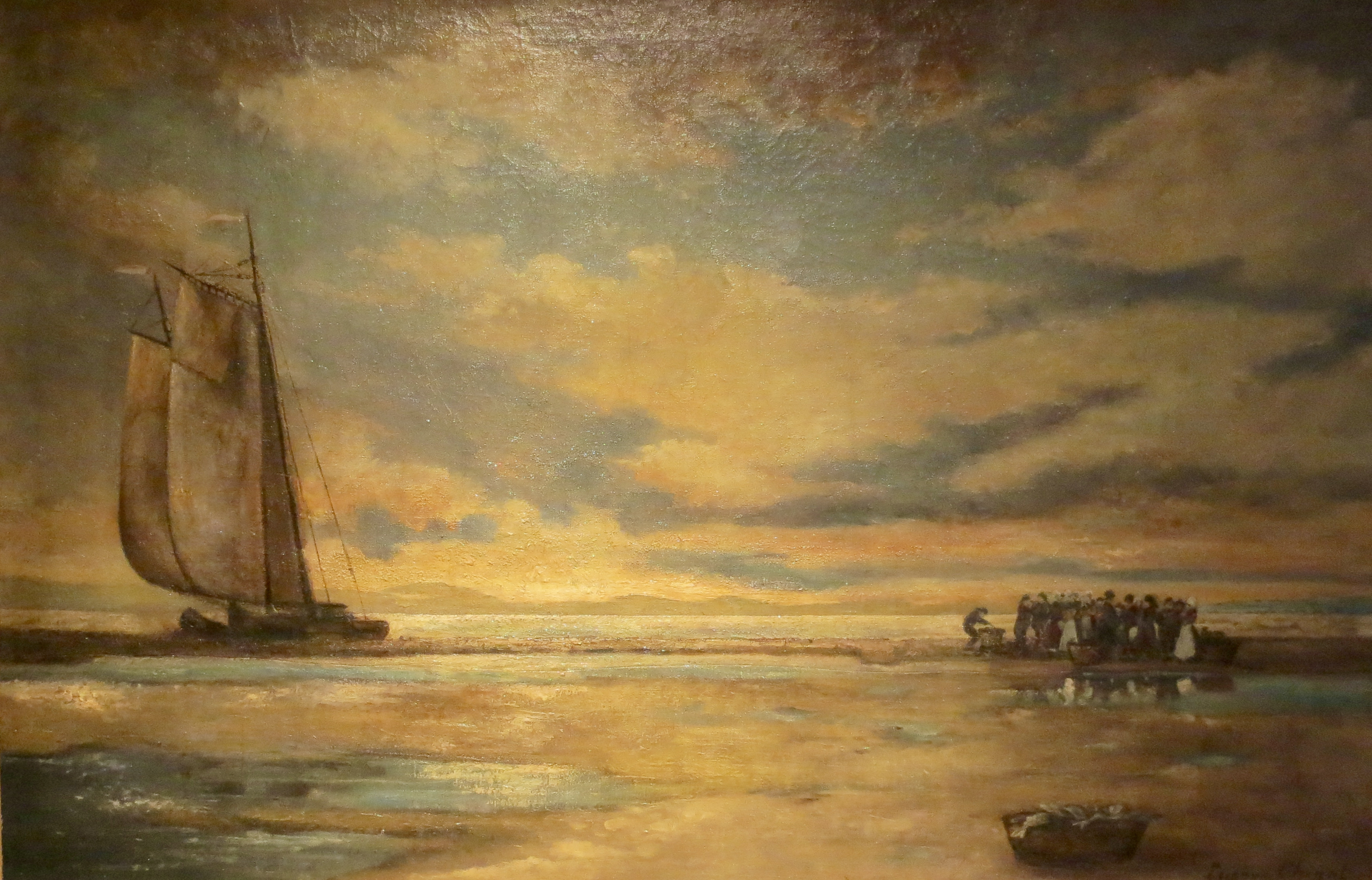

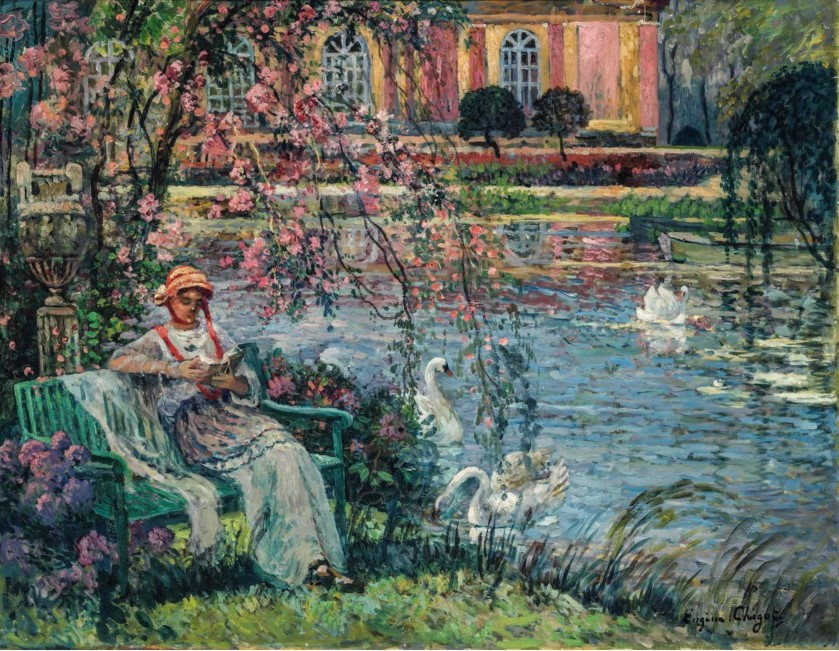

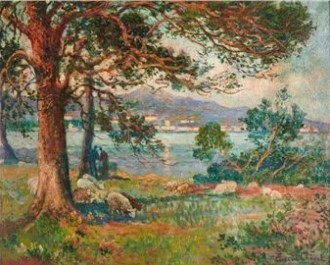

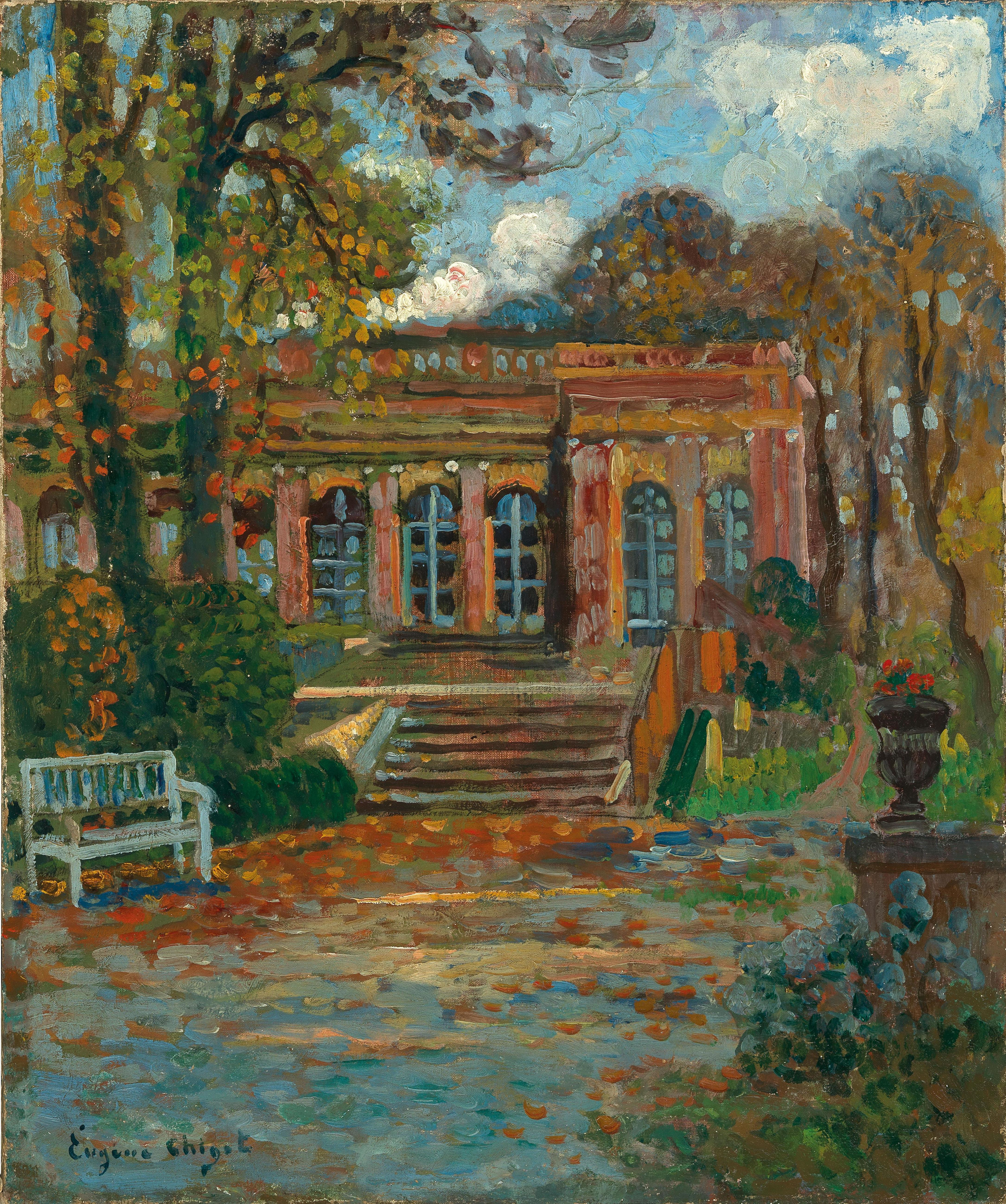

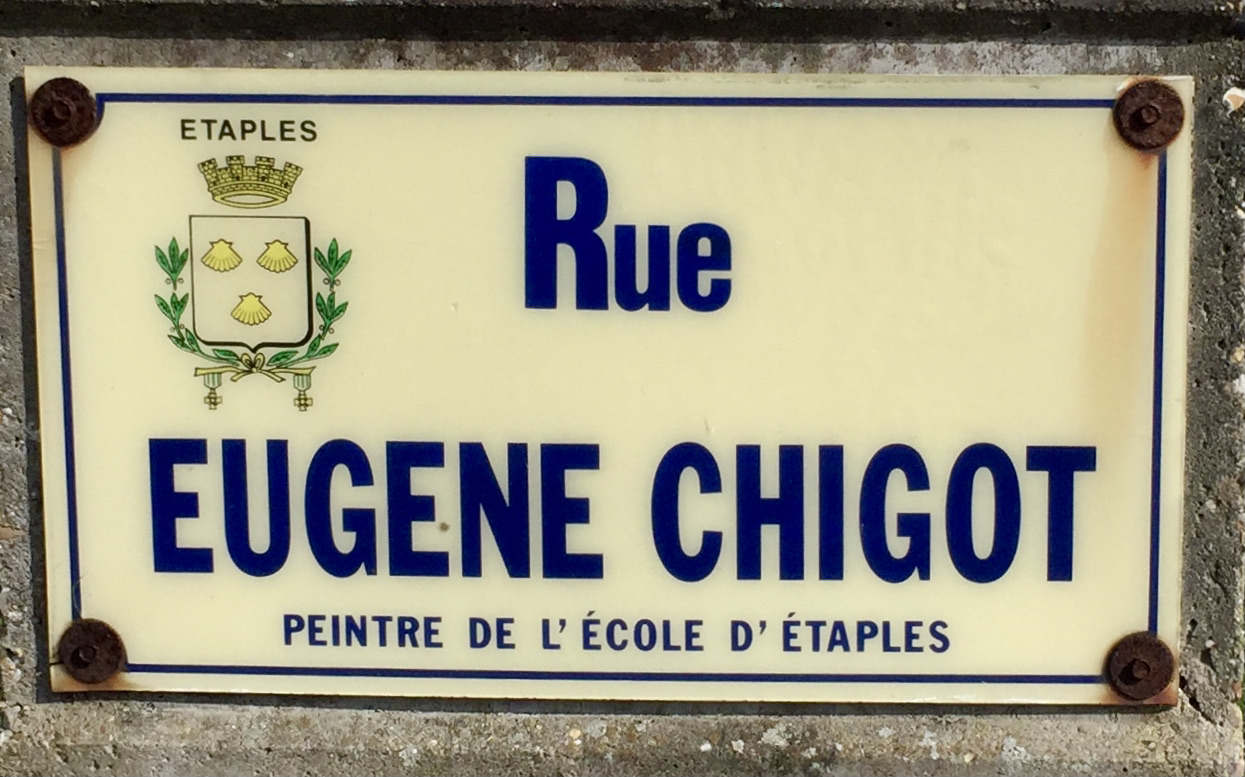
