= Charles-Raphaël Maréchal =

French painter

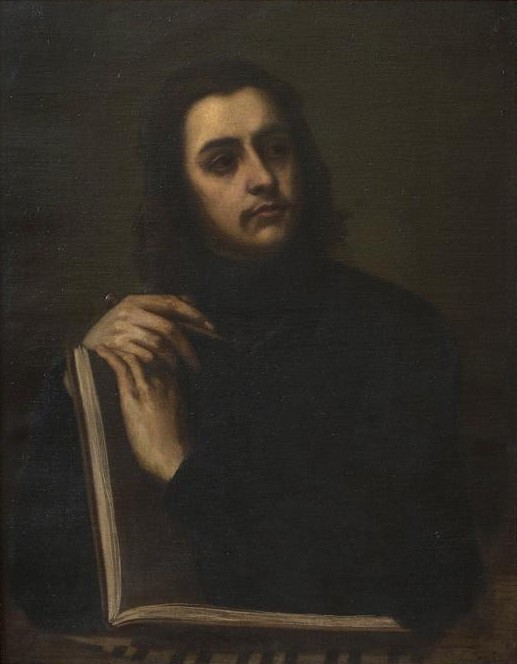
Portrait by his father Charles-Laurent Maréchal, 1855–1857

Charles-Raphaël Maréchal (1825 – 1888) was a French painter of the nineteenth century.

== Life ==
Maréchal was the son of the glass painter Charles-Laurent Maréchal. Like his father, he was born in Metz, in 1881. He was trained in charcoal technique from a young age by his father and pointed toward an artistic career. He exhibited several times at the Salon (the official art exhibition of the prestigious Académie des Beaux-Arts in Paris), including in 1868. In 1872, the City of Metz bought the immense charcoal work Prayer In The Wilderness, which Maréchal had produced for the Metz Exposition of 1861.

Interested in chemistry, he is credited as co-inventor (with Cyprien Tessié du Motay) of the collotype process. (Note: Invention of the collotype is also ascribed to Alphonse Louis Poitevin) Maréchal and du Motay's work won a gold medal at the Paris Exposition of 1867. Together, Maréchal and du Motay were awarded several patents for processes such as printing on glass windows, producing oxygen for public lighting, and so forth.

Maréchal died in Paris on 8 April 1888.

== Works in the Louvre collection ==
Maréchal's works in the collection of the Louvre in Paris are:

- "The Emperor and Empress, In Their Wisdom and Might, Demonstrate the Grand Designs That Will Cover the Reign of Napoleon III in Glory" (oil on canvas)
- "Presentation of the Tuileries design to Catherine de Medici" (oil on canvas)
- "Presentation to Henry IV of the waterfront gallery" (oil on canvas)
- "Presentation to Louis XIV of the Louvre colonnade" (oil on canvas)
- "Presentation to Francis I of the original draft of the Louvre" (oil on canvas)
