= Charles-Laurent Maréchal =

French painter

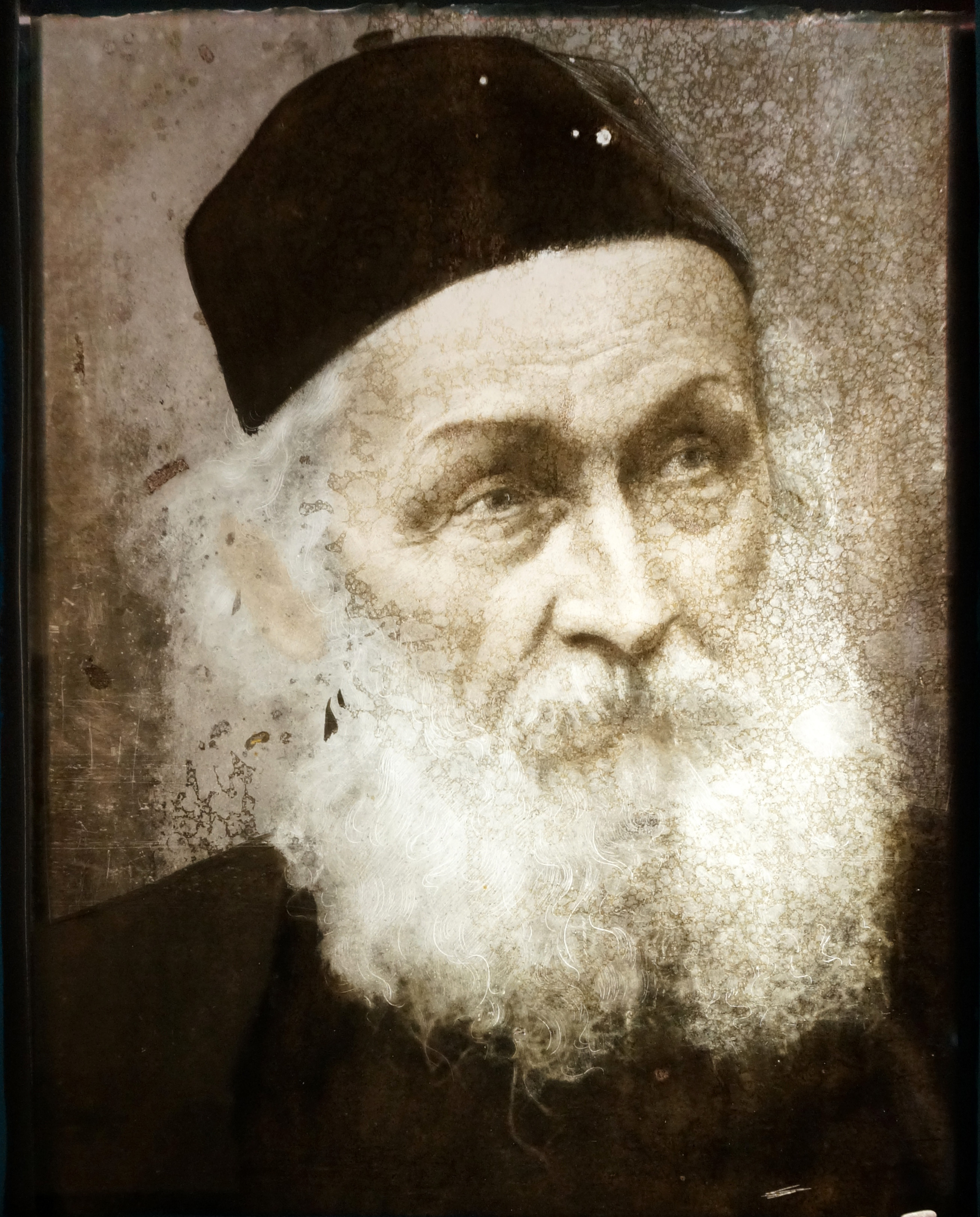
Self-portrait on glass Window

Charles-Laurent Maréchal, alternatively named Laurent-Charles (27 January 1801 – 17 January 1887) was a French painter.

== Biography ==
Maréchal was born of poor parents at Metz in 1801. He was brought up as a saddler, but his bent for art took him early to Paris, where during several years he was a pupil of Jean-Baptiste Regnault. In 1825, he returned to Metz, and in the following year exhibited at the Exposition of the Department of the Moselle, a picture of 'Job,' which procured him the first-class silver medal.

In 1831, on the visit of King Louis Philippe I to Metz, he presented to that sovereign a picture of his painting entitled 'Prayer', which obtained honourable mention at the salon of the current year. Amongst his remaining paintings in oil are 'Masaccio as a boy,' 'The Harvest,' and the ' Apotheosis of St. Catherine' painted in 1842 for the Metz Cathedral. He, however, eventually abandoned oil, as a vehicle, in favour of pastel, as being better adapted to his free and sketchy style. In this medium he produced a vast number of subjects of the Bohemian type, as the 'Sisters of Misery,' 'Hungarian Woodcutters' (1840), 'La Petite Gitana' (1841), 'Leisure,' 'Distress,' 'The Adepts,' &c., for which he received successively medals of the third, second, and first class.

But more important than all these labours was the new industry which he was enabled to establish in his native town in glass painting. His productions in this line, exhibited at the Great Exhibition of 1851, obtained for him a medal of the first class; and the two vast hemicycles, which he executed for the Palace of Industry of Paris in 1855, obtained for him the grade of officer of the Legion of Honour, he having received the first decoration in 1846. Charles-Laurent Maréchal has since decorated with painted windows a great number of the principal churches in France, Notre-Dame being the most famous; at Paris, St. Vincent de Paul, St. Clotilda, St. Valere; the cathedrals of Troyes, Metz, Cambray, Limoges, and parish churches too numerous to mention. Charles-Laurent Maréchal died in Bar-le-Duc in 1887.

His son, Charles-Raphaël Maréchal (1818 Metz -1886 Paris), was a clever painter of genre. His ' Simoom,' 'Halt at Evening, and ' The Shipwrecked,' were exhibited in 1853 and 1857.
