= The Song of the Lark =

The Song of the Lark may refer to:

- The Song of the Lark (painting), an 1884 painting by Jules Breton
- The Song of the Lark (novel), a 1915 novel by Willa Cather
