= The Weeders (Jules Breton) =

Painting by Jules Breton

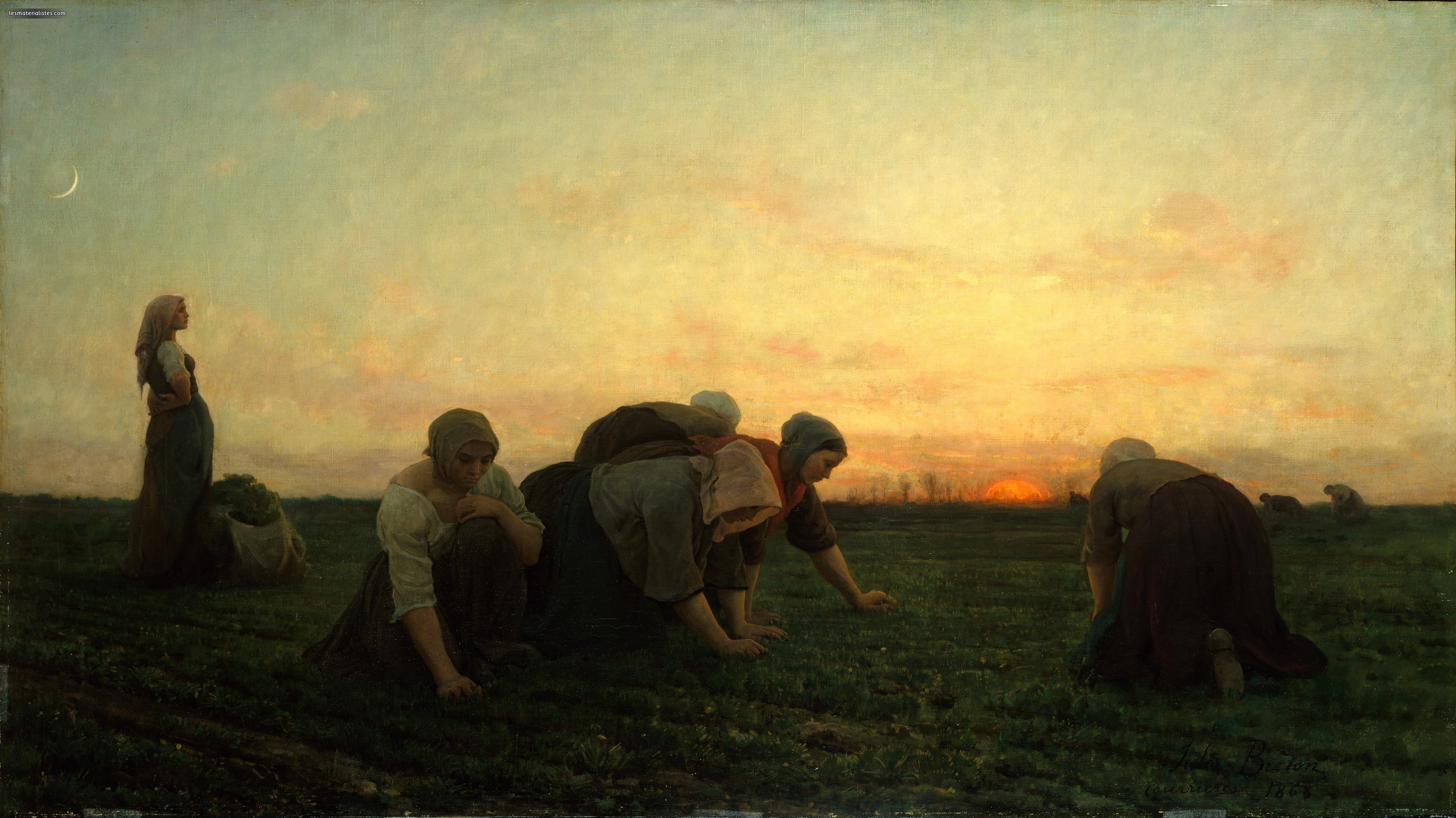
- Artist: Jules Breton
- Year: 1868
- Medium: Oil on canvas
- Dimensions: 71.4 cm × 127.6 cm (28.1 in × 50.2 in)
- Location: Joslyn Art Museum; Omaha

The Weeders is an oil on canvas painting by Jules Breton, from 1868. It depicts a group of peasant women working the fields of Northern France. The painting is in the Joslyn Art Museum, in Omaha, Nebraska.

== Description ==
Originally a painter of historical scenes, Breton began to shift with time his focus to agrarian scenes. One of the paintings produced as a result of this new focus was The Weeders, which Breton painted after observing a group of farmers in his home town of Courrières picking over a field to clear away weeds and thistle. The work reminds The Gleaners by Jean-François Millet (1857).
