= Biegański =

Biegański (feminine Biegańska) is a Polish surname. Notable people with the surname include:

- Guillaume Bieganski (1932–2016), French association football defender of Polish origin
- Jan Biegański (born 2002), Polish footballer
- Wiktor Biegański (1892–1974), Polish actor, film director and screenwriter
