= Emma De Vigne =

Belgian painter

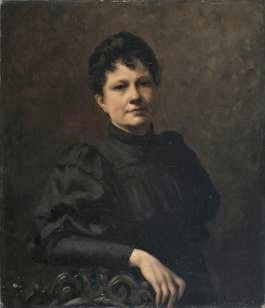
- Self-portrait
- Born: 30 January 1850; Ghent
- Died: 3 June 1898 (aged 48); Ghent
- Style: Sill life; Portrait
- Movement: Flemish School
- Spouse: Jules De Vigne

Emma De Vigne (30 January 1850 – 3 June 1898) was a Belgian still life and portrait painter, who came from a family of artists from Ghent. Her paintings were exhibited in Europe, as well as in South America.

== Biography ==
De Vigne was born on 30 January 1850 in Ghent. The family were all artists: her father, Pieter, and uncle, Felix, were sculptors, and she and her sisters, Louise and Malvina, were painters. It was her uncle, Félix De Vigne, taught her to paint; she later married his son, her cousin Jules De Vigne, who was a lawyer and a writer.

During her lifetime De Vigne was known as a flower, and later portrait painter, who specialised in still life. Her works often sold for over 1000 Belgian Francs, which was notable for a female painter at the time, and were often exhibited alongside other female painters. These women formed a new generation of Flemish artists.

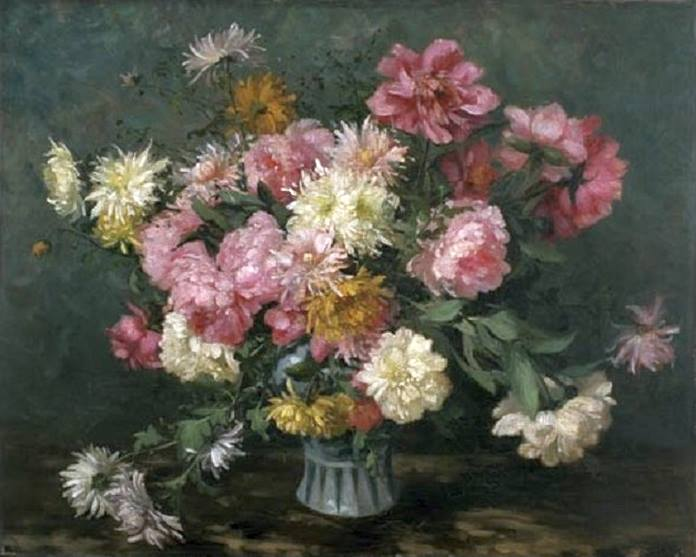
Still life of flowers by Emma De Vigne

In 1887 her work was displayed in Buenos Aires in an exhibition of Belgian art, which opened there on 5 October. Her painting "Fleur de thé" was sold to banker Lisandro Bellinghurst. De Vigne exhibited her work in the Palace of Fine Arts at the 1893 World's Columbian Exposition in Chicago, Illinois.

De Vigne died on 3 June 1898 in Ghent. After her death, her husband published a selection of his writings, which were dedicated to her memory.

== Legacy ==
De Vigne's paintings are held in the collections of the Museum of Fine Arts, Ghent and the Royal Museums of Fine Arts of Belgium.
