= Canton of Carvin =

Coordinates: 50°29′17″N 2°58′49″E

Carvin
- Canton
- Location of Carvin within the department
- Country: France
- Region: Hauts-de-France
- Department: Pas-de-Calais
- No. of communes: {{{nbcomm}}}
- Area: 36.26 km^{2} (14.00 sq mi)
- Population (2023): 36,058
  - Density: 994.4/km^{2} (2,576/sq mi)
- INSEE code: 62 21

The Canton of Carvin is a canton situated in the department of the Pas-de-Calais and in the Hauts-de-France region of northern France.

== Geography ==
The canton is organised around Carvin in the arrondissement of Lens. The elevation varies from 17m to 42m (Carvin) for an average elevation of 25m.

== Composition ==
At the French canton reorganisation which came into effect in March 2015, the canton was expanded from 2 to 3 communes:

- Carvin
- Courrières
- Libercourt

== Population ==
Historical population
| Year | Pop. | ±% p.a. |
|---|---|---|
| 2013 | 36,046 | — |
| 2018 | 36,280 | +0.13% |
Source: INSEE

== See also ==
- Cantons of Pas-de-Calais
- Communes of Pas-de-Calais
- Arrondissements of the Pas-de-Calais department
