= Libercourt =

- Commune
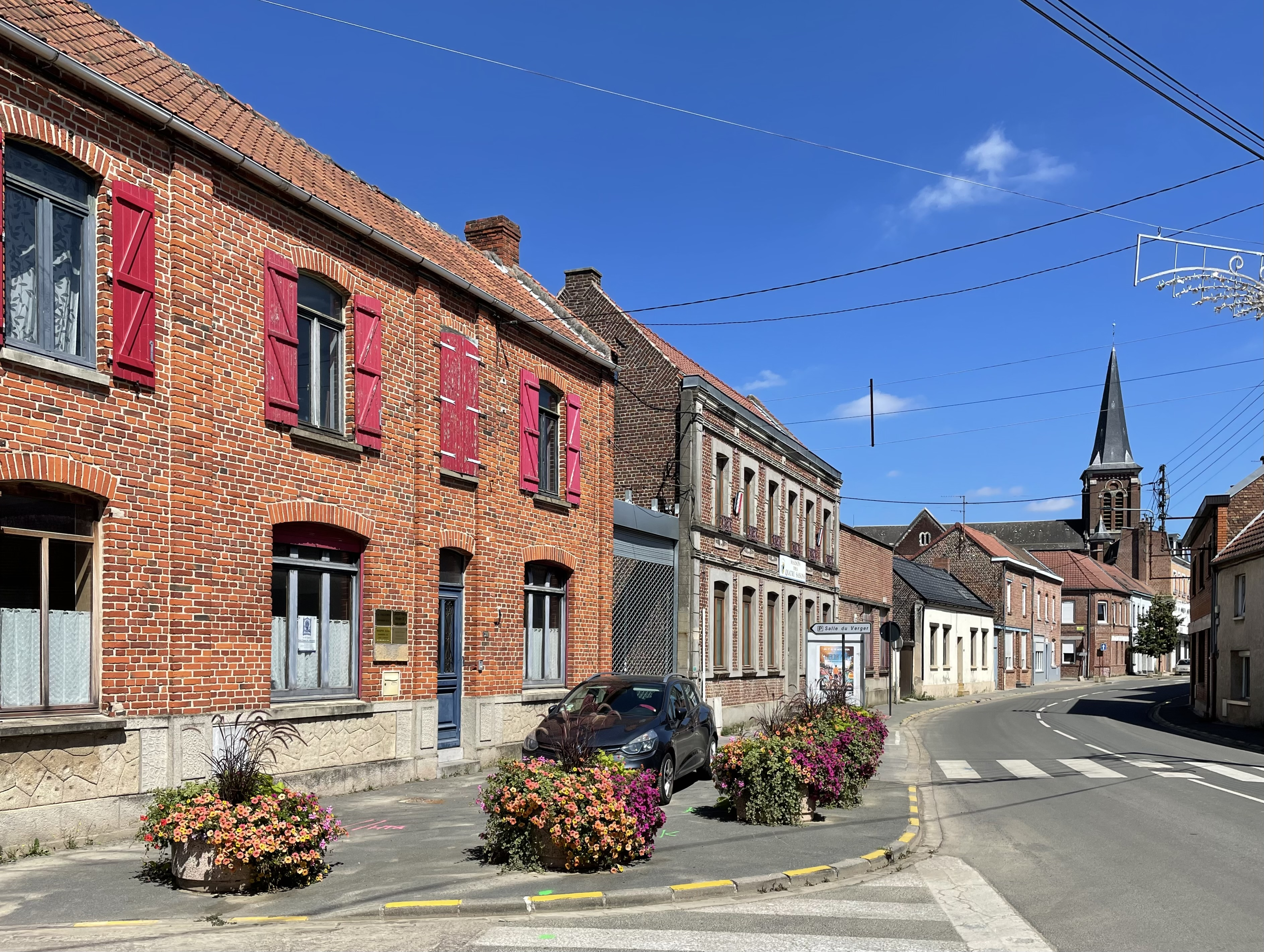
- Main street (Rue Cyprien Quinet)

- Coat of arms
- Location of Libercourt
- Location within France Location within Hauts-de-France
- Coordinates: 50°29′05″N 3°00′53″E
- Country: France
- Region: Hauts-de-France
- Department: Pas-de-Calais
- Arrondissement: Lens
- Canton: Carvin
- Intercommunality: CA Hénin-Carvin

Government
  - Mayor (2020–2026): Daniel Maciejasz
- Area^{1}: 6.6 km^{2} (2.5 sq mi)
- Elevation: 16 m (52 ft)
- Highest elevation: 41 m (135 ft)
- Lowest elevation: 21 m (69 ft)
- Population (2023): 7,973
  - Density: 1,200/km^{2} (3,100/sq mi)
- Time zone: UTC+01:00 (CET)
  - Summer (DST): UTC+02:00 (CEST)
- INSEE/Postal code: 62907 /62820
- ^{1} French Land Register data, which excludes lakes, ponds, glaciers > 1 km^{2} (0.386 sq mi or 247 acres) and river estuaries.

Libercourt (French pronunciation: [libɛʁkuʁ]) is a commune in the Pas-de-Calais department in the Hauts-de-France region of France about 12 miles (19 km) northeast of Lens.

== History ==
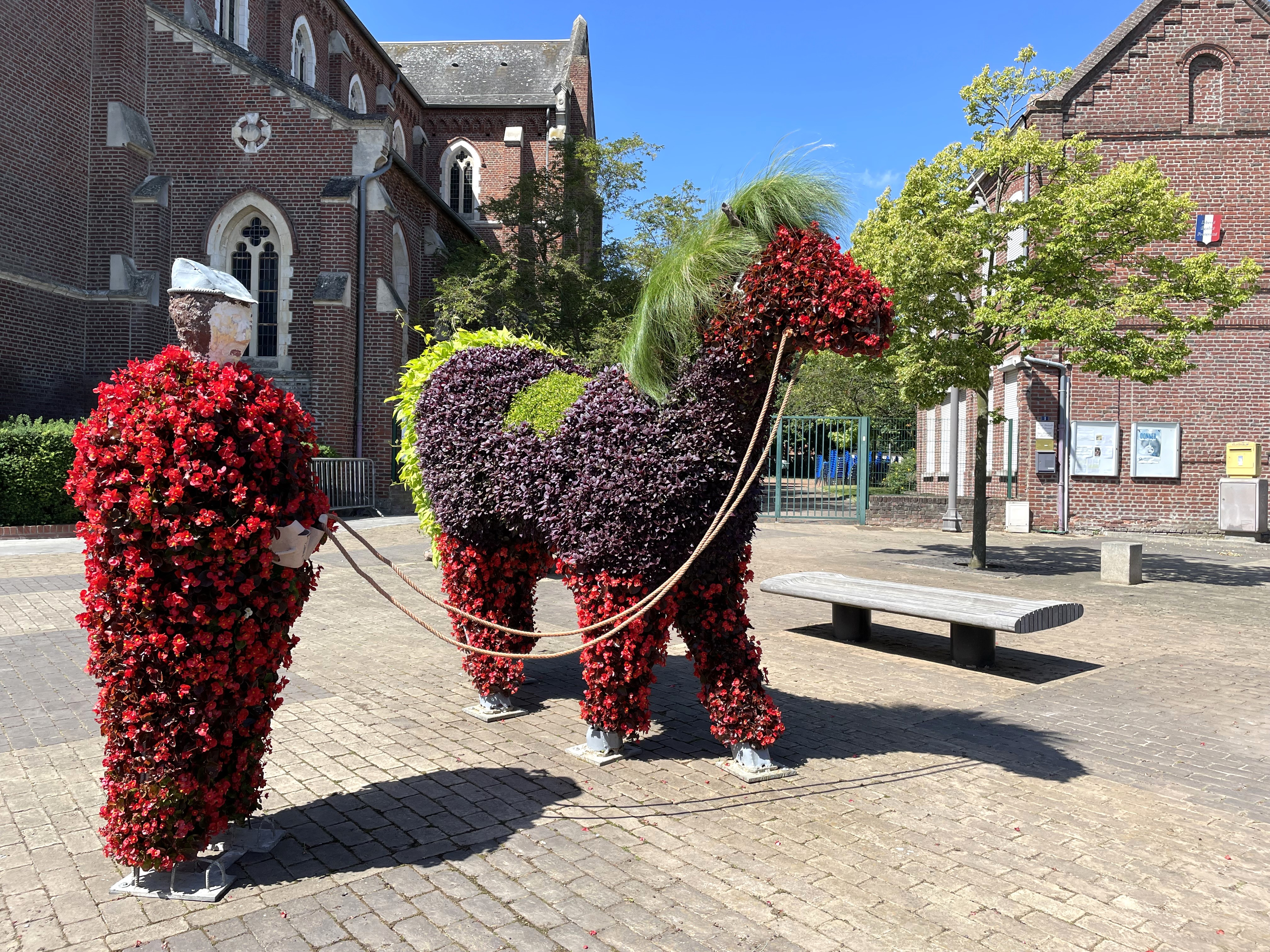
Flowered structures in front of Notre Dame church. Every year, Libercourt takes part in the "competition of towns and villages in bloom" and has reached a high level of "3 flowers".

Libercourt was once an integral part of the neighbouring town of Carvin. It became an independent commune in 1947.

== Population ==
Historical population
Year	Pop.	±% p.a.
1968	10,726	—
1975	9,837	−1.23%
1982	10,093	+0.37%
1990	9,760	−0.42%
1999	8,854	−1.08%
2007	8,861	+0.01%
2012	8,460	−0.92%
2017	8,355	−0.25%
2023	7,973	−0.78%
Source: INSEE

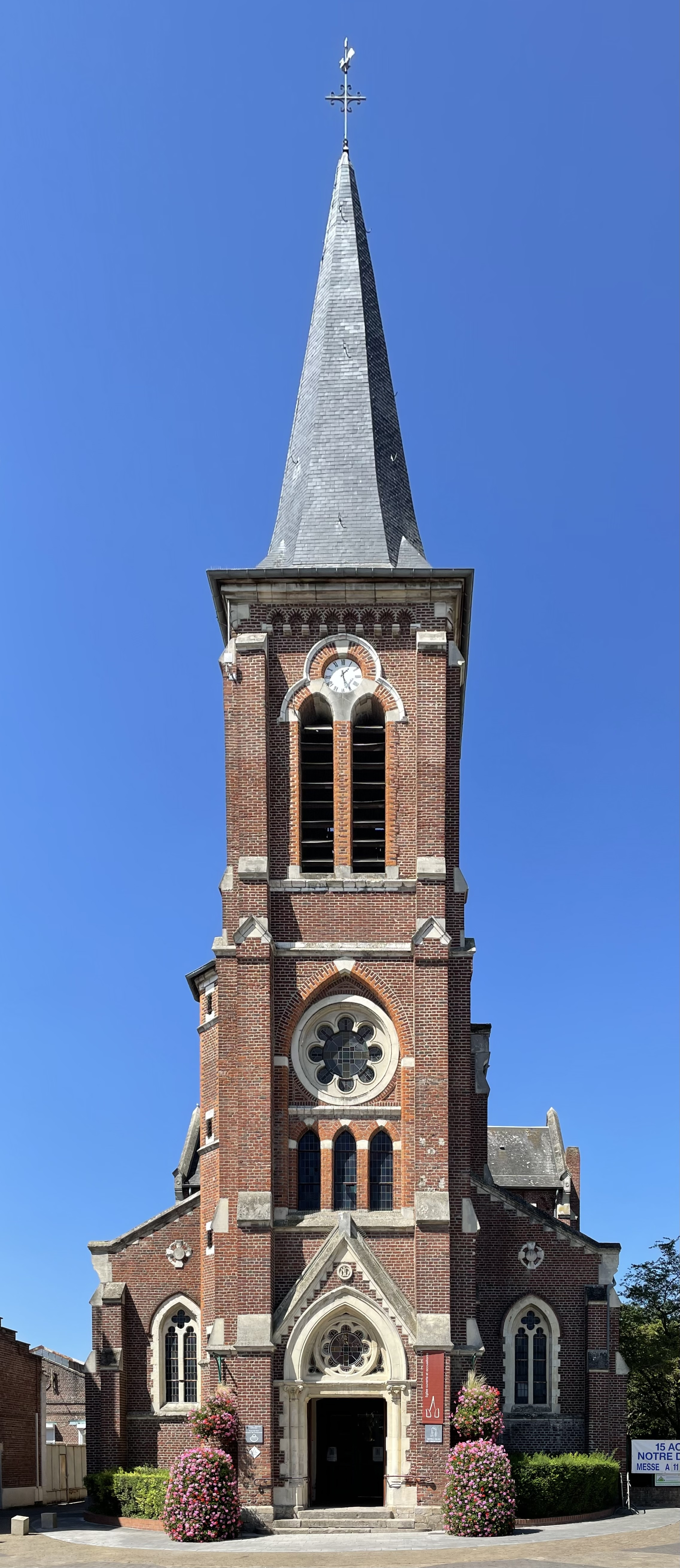
Notre Dame church

== Notable people ==
- Léon Glovacki, footballer was born here.
- Guillaume Bieganski, footballer was born here.

== Twin towns ==
- Jarocin, Poland, since 1977

== See also ==
- Communes of the Pas-de-Calais department
