= Félix De Vigne =

Belgian painter (1806–1862)

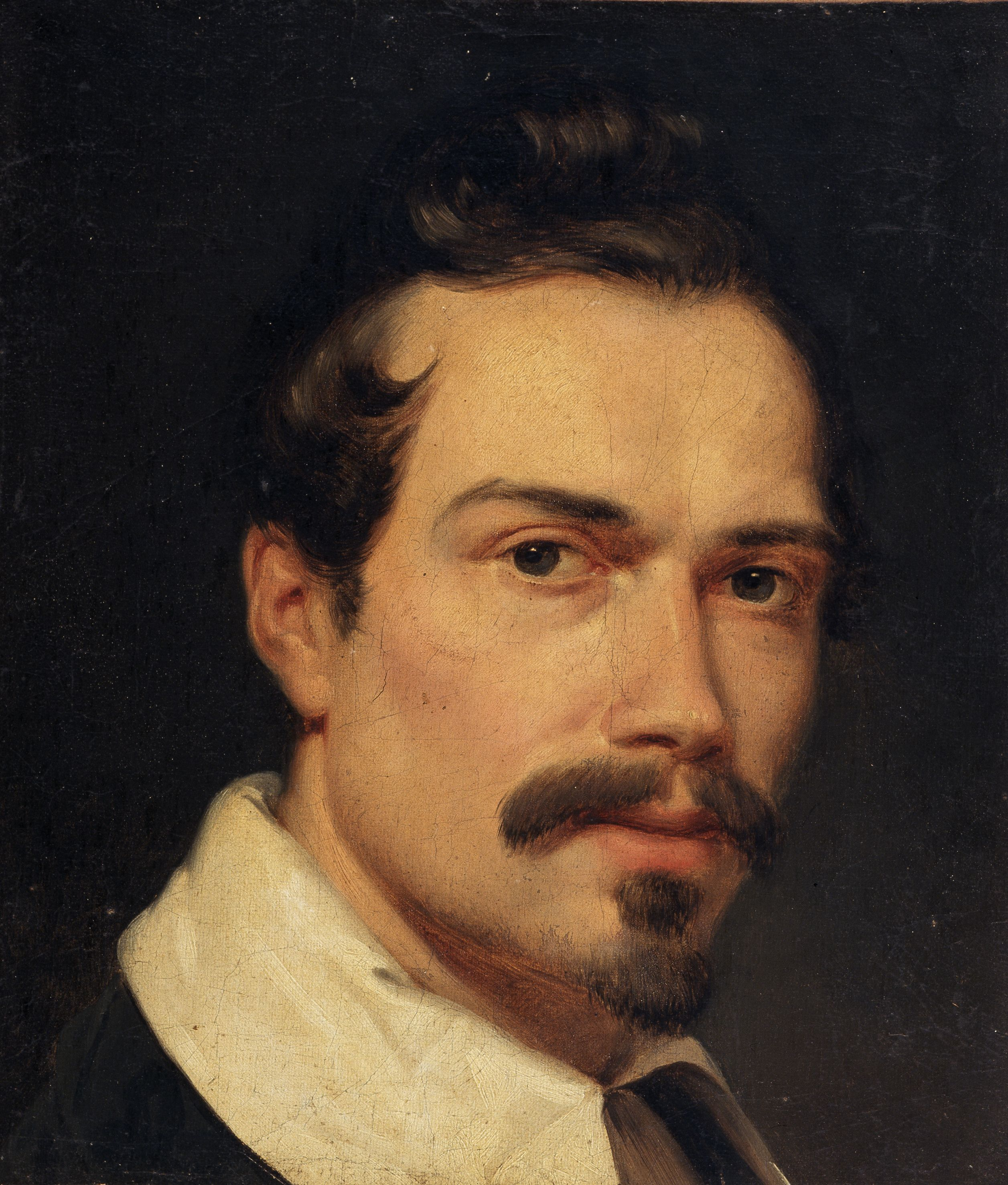
- Self portrait of Félix de Vigne
- Born: Félix De Vigne; 16 March 1806; Ghent, First French Empire
- Died: 5 December 1862 (aged 56)
- Education: Royal Academy of Fine Arts of Ghent
- Occupation: Painter
- Relatives: Edmond De Vigne (son) Jules Breton (son-in-law) Emma De Vigne (niece)

Félix De Vigne (16 March 1806 – 5 December 1862) was a Belgian painter. He was a history painter, engraver, art historian, and instructor at the Royal Academy of Fine Arts in Ghent, Belgium, the city of his birth. In 1847, he published Recherches historiques sur les costumes civils et militaires, an illustrated compendium of the flags, shields and costumes of medieval guilds and military groups.

== Personal life ==
De Vigne was born in Ghent on 16 March 1806, the eldest of six children. His brother was sculptor Pieter De Vigne (1812–1877). He was the father of Brussels architect Edmond De Vigne (1841–1918). He was also the father-in-law of painter Jules Breton, who married De Vigne's eldest daughter, Elodie.

De Vigne taught his niece, Emma De Vigne, paint.

== Sources ==
- This page translated from its Dutch equivalent accessed 9/13/2010
