= The End of the Working Day =

Painting by Jules Breton

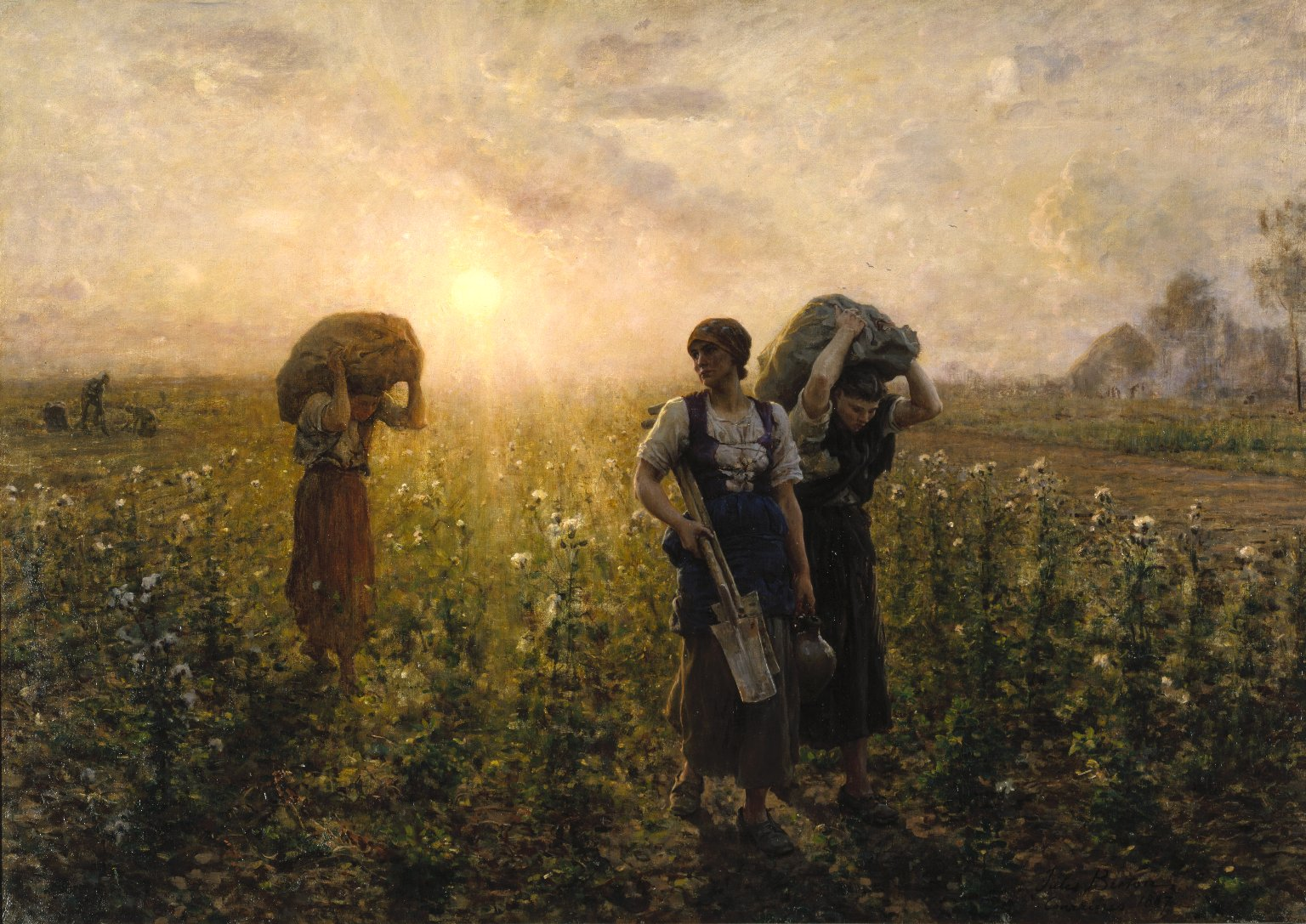
- Artist: Jules Breton
- Year: 1886-1887
- Medium: Oil on canvas
- Dimensions: 84 cm × 120 cm (33 in × 47 in)
- Location: Brooklyn Museum, New York

The End of the Working Day is an oil on canvas painting by the French artist Jules Breton, from 1886-1887. It is held at the Brooklyn Museum, in New York.

== History and description ==
Breton portrays a scene at the sunset where three peasant women are returning home, after an working day, crossing some flowery fields. Two of them carry heavy loads on their backs. The other carries shovels and a pitcher. Two people are seen in the background, at the upper left, working in the land. This vision of the peasants life is rather idealized, far from the realist vision that can be seen in the work of Jean-François Millet.

The Brooklyn Museum website states that: "Here, bathed in the glow of the setting sun, three women cross flowering fields, their postures evoking those of ancient classical sculpture."

A critic wrote on his work in 1868: "He is little smitten with reality and generally horrified by the peasantry. M. Millet, on the other hand, has consistently taken the part of brutal reality."
