= Jules Breton =

French painter (1827–1906)

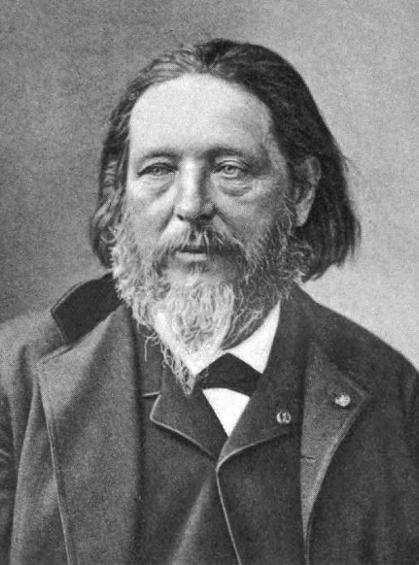
- Jules Breton
- Born: Jules Adolphe Aimé Louis Breton; 1 May 1827; Courrières, France
- Died: 5 July 1906 (aged 79); Paris, France
- Education: École des Beaux-Arts
- Known for: Painting
- Notable work: The Song of the Lark
- Movement: Realism
- Family: Virginie Demont-Breton (daughter); Émile Breton (brother)

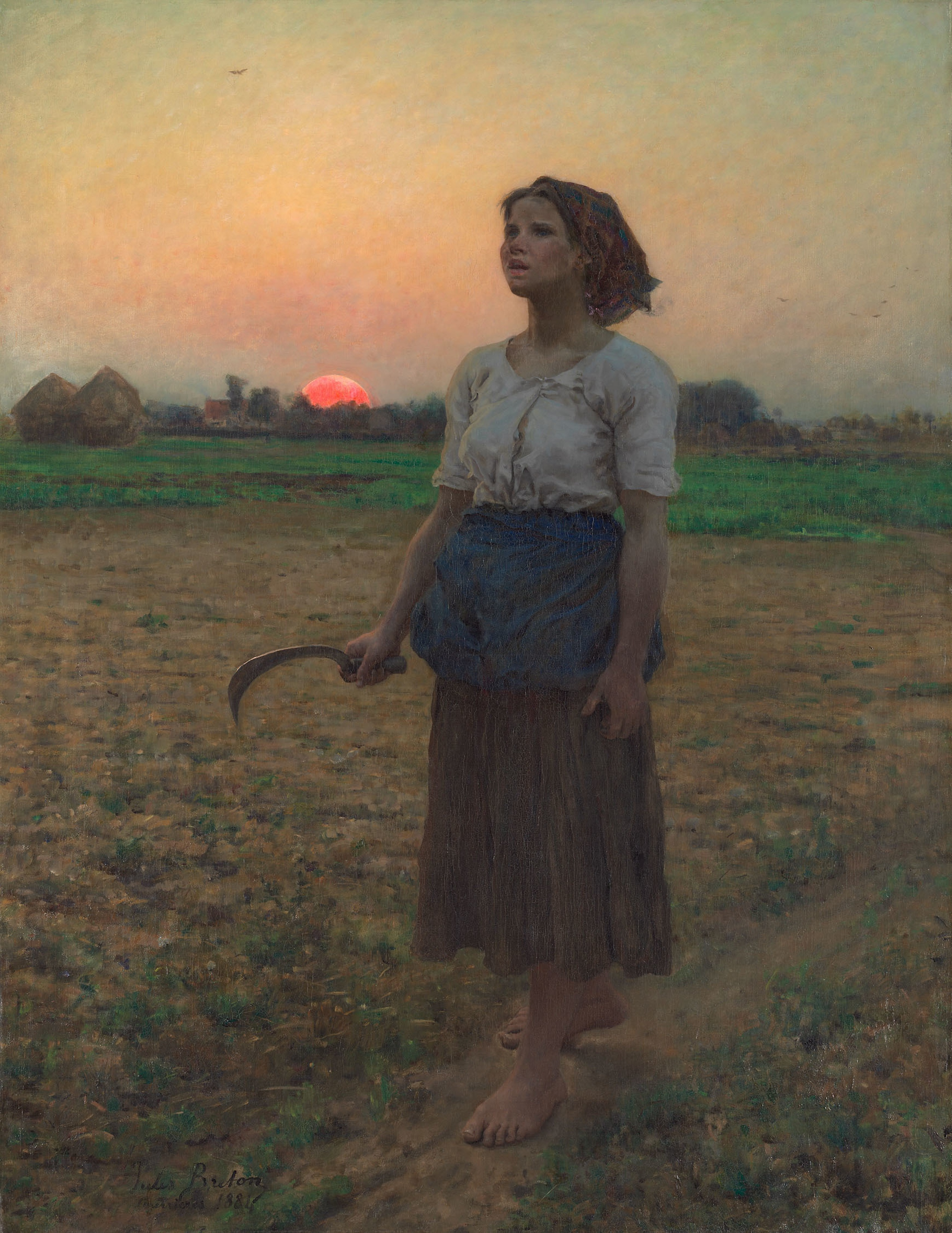
The Song of the Lark, oil on canvas, 1884, Art Institute of Chicago

Jules Adolphe Aimé Louis Breton (French pronunciation: [ʒyl adɔlf ɛme lwi bʁətɔ̃]; 1 May 1827 – 5 July 1906) was a 19th-century French naturalist painter. His paintings are heavily influenced by the French countryside and his absorption of traditional methods of painting helped make him one of the primary transmitters of the beauty and idyllic vision of rural existence.

== Early life and training ==
Breton was born on 1 May 1827 in Courrières, a small Pas-de-Calais village. His father, Marie-Louis Breton, supervised land for a wealthy landowner. His mother died when Jules was four and he was brought up by his father. Other family members who lived in the same house were his maternal grandmother, his younger brother, Émile, and his uncle Boniface Breton. A respect for tradition, a love of the land and for his native region remained central to his art throughout his life and provided the artist with many scenes for his Salon compositions.

His first artistic training was not far from Courrières at the College St. Bertin near Saint-Omer. He met the painter Félix De Vigne in 1842 who, impressed by his youthful talent, persuaded his family to let him study art. Breton left for Ghent in 1843 where he continued to study art at the Academy of Fine Arts with de Vigne and the painter Hendrik Van der Haert. In 1846, Breton moved to Antwerp where he took lessons with Egide Charles Gustave Wappers and spent some time copying the works of Flemish masters. In 1847, he left for Paris where he hoped to perfect his artistic training at the École des Beaux-Arts.

In Paris he studied in the atelier of the Michel Martin Drolling. He met and became friends with several of the Realist painters, including François Bonvin and Gustave Brion and his early entries at the Paris Salon reflected their influence. His first efforts were in historical subjects: Saint Piat preaching in Gaul then, under the influence of the revolution of 1848, he represented Misery and Despair. The Salon displayed his painting Misery and Despair in 1849 and Hunger in 1850–51.

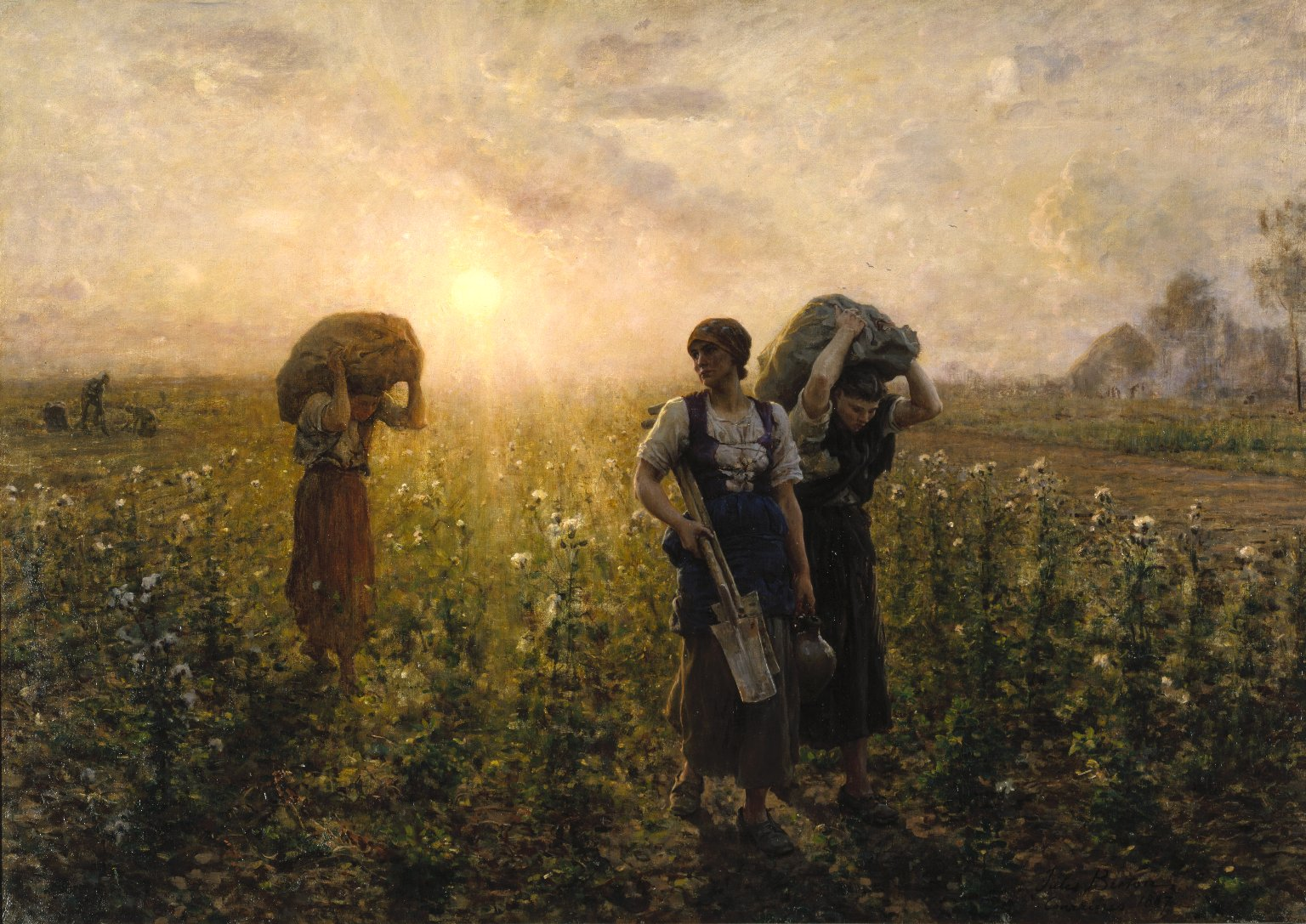
The End of the Working Day, 1886–87, Brooklyn Museum

Both paintings have since been destroyed. After Hunger was successfully shown in Brussels and Ghent, Breton moved to Belgium where he met his future wife Elodie. Elodie was the daughter of his early teacher Félix de Vigne. In 1852, Breton returned to France. But he had discovered that he was not born to be a historical painter, and he returned to the memories of nature and of the country which were impressed on him in early youth. In 1853 he exhibited Return of the Reapers, the first of numerous rural peasant scenes influenced by the works of the Swiss painter Louis Léopold Robert. Breton's interest in peasant imagery was well established from then on and what he is best known for today. In 1854, he returned to the village of Courrières where he settled. He began The Gleaners, a work inspired by seasonal field labor and the plight of the less fortunate who were left to gather what remained in the field after the harvest. The Gleaners received a third class medal, which launched Breton's career. He received commissions from the State and many of his works were purchased by the French Art Administration and sent to provincial museums. His 1857 painting Blessing of the Wheat, Artois was exhibited at the Salon the same year and won a second class medal.

Breton married Elodie de Vigne in 1858.

== Fame during his lifetime ==
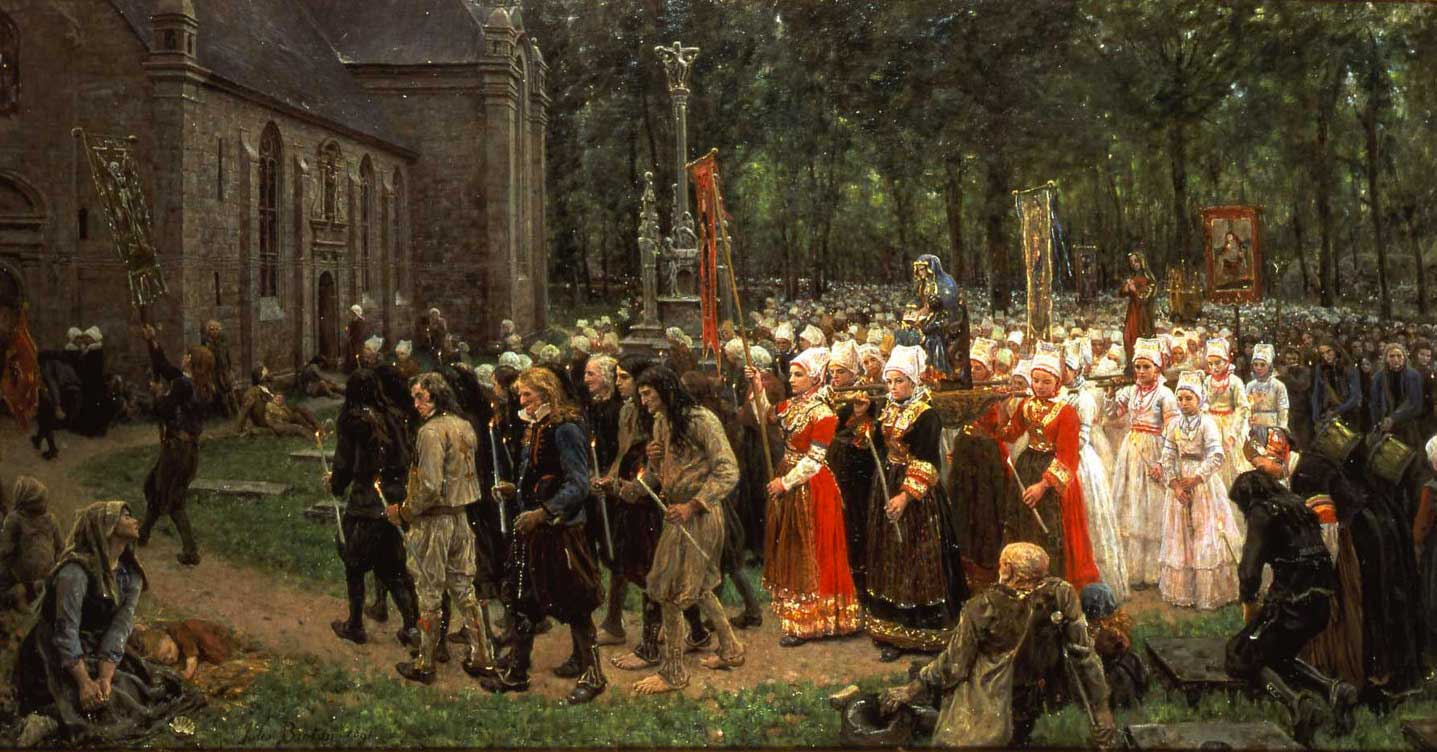
A Pardon in Kergoat (1891). Breton visited Brittany several times, believing he had (as his name implied) Breton ancestry.

He continued to exhibit throughout the 1870s and into the 1880s and 1890s and his reputation grew. His poetic renderings of single peasant female figures in a landscape, posed against the setting sun, remained very popular, especially in the United States. Since his works were so popular, Breton often produced copies of some of his images. He was extremely popular in his own time, exhibiting numerous compositions at the Salons that were widely available as engravings. He was one of the best known painters of his period in his native France as well as England and the United States.

In 1886, Donald Smith, 1st Baron Strathcona and Mount Royal, bid $45,000 at a New York auction for Breton's work The Communicants (1884). At that time, the price was the second highest price paid for a painting by a living artist. The painting changed hands again in 2016 and commanded $1.27 million. That figure is very close to the 1886 auction price after adjusting for inflation. Also in 1886, Breton was elected a member of the Institut de France on the death of Baudry.

In 1887 New York art dealer M. Knoedler ordered two paintings from Breton, commissioned Charles Albert Waltner to etch the grand Salon work the Recall of the Gleaners (1859) and then held a special exhibition of his works in 1888.

In 1889 Breton was made commander of the Legion of Honor, and in 1899 foreign member of the Royal Academy of London. His brother Emile, an architect by training, and his daughter Virginie were also painters.

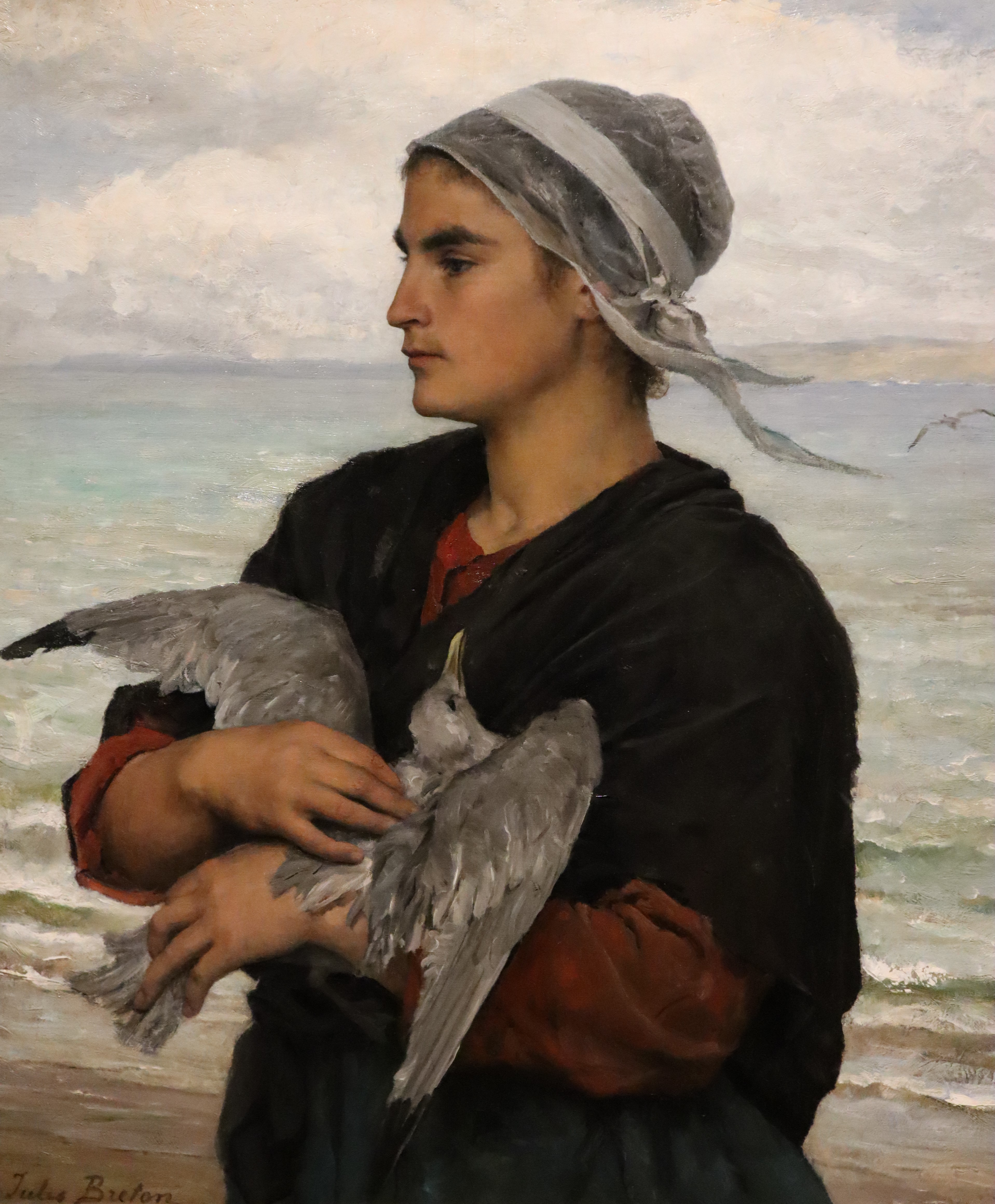
Wounded Seagull (1878) oil on canvas, depicting a woman on the coast of Brittany holding a bird to her breast, with another flying in the distance.

He also wrote several books, and was a recognized writer who published a volume of poems (Jeanne) and several editions of prose relating his life as an artist and the lives of other artists that he personally knew; among them Les Champs et la mer (1876), Nos peintres du siècle (1900), Delphine Bernard (1902), and La Peinture (1904). Breton died in Paris on 5 July 1906.

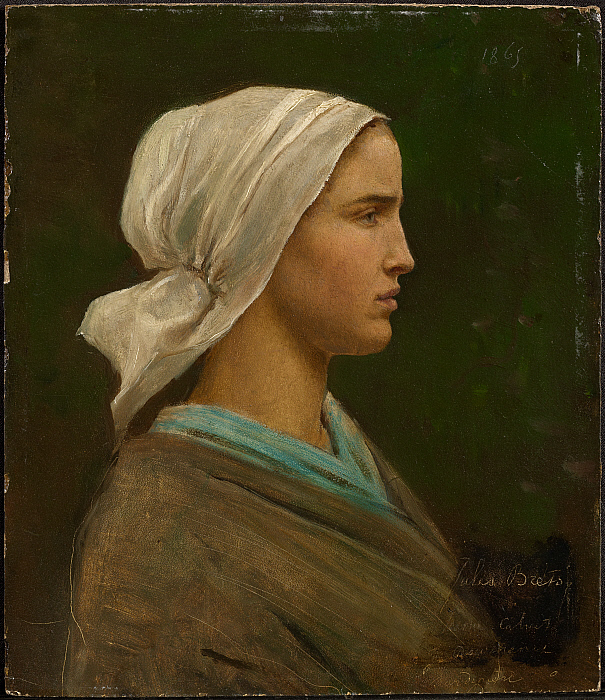
Jeanne Calvet (1865), oil on millboard, Clark Art Institute

According to the Encyclopædia Britannica Eleventh Edition 1911, Breton was essentially a painter of rustic life, especially in the province of Artois, which he quit only three times for short excursions: in 1864 to Provence, and in 1865 and 1873 to Brittany, whence he derived some of his happiest studies of religious scenes. His numerous subjects may be divided generally into four classes: labour, rest, rural festivals and religious festivals. Among his more important works, with their location as of 1911, may be named Women Gleaning, and The Day after St Sebastian's Day (1855), which gained him a third-class medal; Blessing the Fields (1857), a second-class medal; Erecting a Calvary (1859), now in the Lille gallery; The Return of the Gleaners (1859), now in the Luxembourg; Evening and Women Weeding (1861), a first-class medal; Grandfather's Birthday (1862); The Close of Day (1865); Harvest (1867); Potato Gatherers (1868); The Weeders (1868); A Pardon, Brittany (1869); The Fountain (1872), medal of honour; The Bonfires of St John (1875); Women mending Nets (1876), in the Douai museum; A Gleaner (1877), Luxembourg; Evening, Finistère (1881); The Song of the Lark (1884); The Last Sunbeam (1885); The Shepherd's Star (1887); The Call Home (1889); The Last Gleanings (1895); Gathering Poppies (1897); The Alarm Cry (1899); Twilight Glory (1900).

He died on 5 July 1906, in Paris.

== Posthumous fame ==
Arguably, Breton's fame peaked posthumously in 1934 at The Chicago World's Fair. First Lady Eleanor Roosevelt unveiled The Song of the Lark as the winner of the Chicago Daily News contest to find the "most beloved work of art in America". Further, she declared the painting as being her personal favorite painting. "At this moment The Song of the Lark had come to represent the popular American artistic taste on a national level." Of course, since The Song of the Lark was recently given to the Art Institute of Chicago this particular work of Breton had an advantage over Breton works at other American museums. Breton, however, was not universally appreciated. The American art establishment of the 1930s considered works of Breton to be lowbrow and the director of the Art Institute of Chicago itself argued for the removal of the work from display. It was not until the later half of the twentieth century, that Breton's social realism became more respectable again.

Breton's most detailed works either went straight into museums or were collected by the likes of Henry Clay Frick, Catharine Lorillard Wolfe, the Morgan family, Henry Huntington and the Field family. These were collectors of such great wealth that they tended to either donate their collections to their favorite local museum or founded their own museum such as the Huntington. Meanwhile, the exponential increase in printmaking in the 19th century flooded the market with inexpensive prints of Breton's works. In 2019, dozens of these 19th century prints are available on websites like EBay beginning at under $10.

Breton's change in fame can be contrasted with his contemporary the artist Vincent van Gogh. During their lifetimes, Breton was a celebrated and highly paid successful artist. He spent months creating some of his works. Whereas, in 1880 Vincent van Gogh was so poor he walked on foot 85 kilometers to Courrières to pay a visit to Breton, whom he greatly admired, but turned back, put off by Breton's high wall. No great collectors flocked to purchase van Gogh's works during his lifetime, he received no commissions to paint from New York City, no prints were made while he lived, and he died in poverty. However, at a 2015 auction van Gogh's work Paysage Sous un ciel Mouvement, painted at a time he generated one work per day, commanded $54 million. Ironically, in a letter to his brother Theo, van Gogh mentions he viewed Breton's painting The Song of the Lark and considered it to be "fine".

== Prints and reproductions ==
In 1898 Knoedler published a catalog of their prints and listed eight prints after Jules Breton including The Evening etched by Charles Waltner, four prints etched by Lionel Aristide Lecouteux, The Song of the Lark by Charles Louis Kratke, and Last Ray by Paul-Adolphe Rajon. Other publishers of his prints included Arthur Tooth & Sons of London, Detroit Publishing Co, and Morris & Bendien of New York. Other etchers include Charles Koepping and W. S. Lathrop and Leopold Joseph Flameng. Most prints tended to be rather small and unsigned. A few have survived that were signed by both Jules Breton and the etcher. Works by Breton are still popular and are being reproduced in giclée framed and unframed as well as everything from shopping bags to pillows and bed covers as well as tee-shirts and coffee mugs.

== Homages ==
In 1912, rue Jules Breton in the 13th arrondissement of Paris was given his name.

Willa Cather's 1915 novel The Song of the Lark takes its name from Breton's 1884 painting.

In February 2014, actor Bill Murray disclosed at a press event for the film The Monuments Men, that a chance encounter with Breton's The Song of the Lark at the Art Institute of Chicago helped him at a low point in his early career.

== Art market ==
The most expensive painting by the artist in the art market was The Communicants (Les communiantes) (1884), which sold by $1,270,000 at Sotheby's New York, on 18 May 2016.
