= Charles Albert Waltner =

French artist and etcher

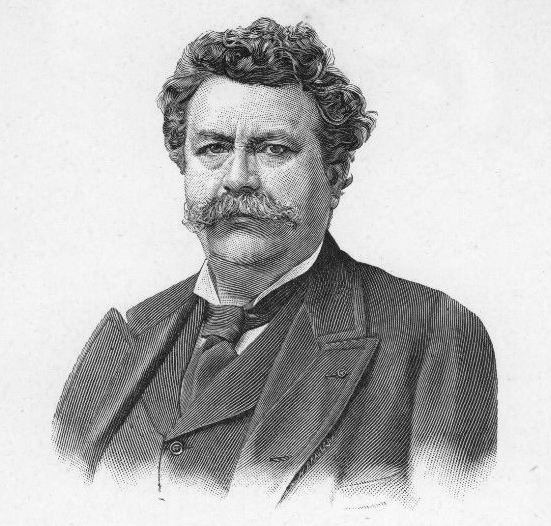
- Born: March 24, 1846; Paris
- Died: June 15, 1925 (aged 79)
- Known for: Etchings

Charles Albert Waltner, aka C. A. Waltner (Paris 23 or 24 March 1846 – 15 June 1925 Paris) was a French artist and etcher. His father, Charles Jules Waltner, was also a French artist and etcher who engraved religious subjects for specialized publishers from 1848. Waltner studied painting under the guidance of Jean-Léon Gérôme and Léon Bonnat. Later he was taught by Henriquel-Dupont in the art of copper cutting and etching.

Waltner became known for his ability to render large color paintings by the likes of Rembrandt, Thomas Gainsborough and Jules Breton into etchings. The etchings were in turn converted into prints by firms like Arthur Tooth & Sons. The final prints were typically sold to the general public at a more affordable price than the original work using a network of dealers. In the case of works where the original artist was still alive, the original artist frequently encouraged the practice and may have signed the final prints along with Waltner. Prints helped the original artist increase their income as well as spread their fame.

In 1868, Waltner won a Prix de Rome scholarship that allowed him to live and study in Rome. Waltner taught etching to a large number of students such as Léon Desbuissons and Pauline Laurens. He was a member of the jury and exhibited at the first international exhibition of white and black in 1885 at the Pavillon de Flore, and participated as a founder in the reopening of the National Society of Fine Arts. In 1908, he was admitted to the Academy of Fine Arts.

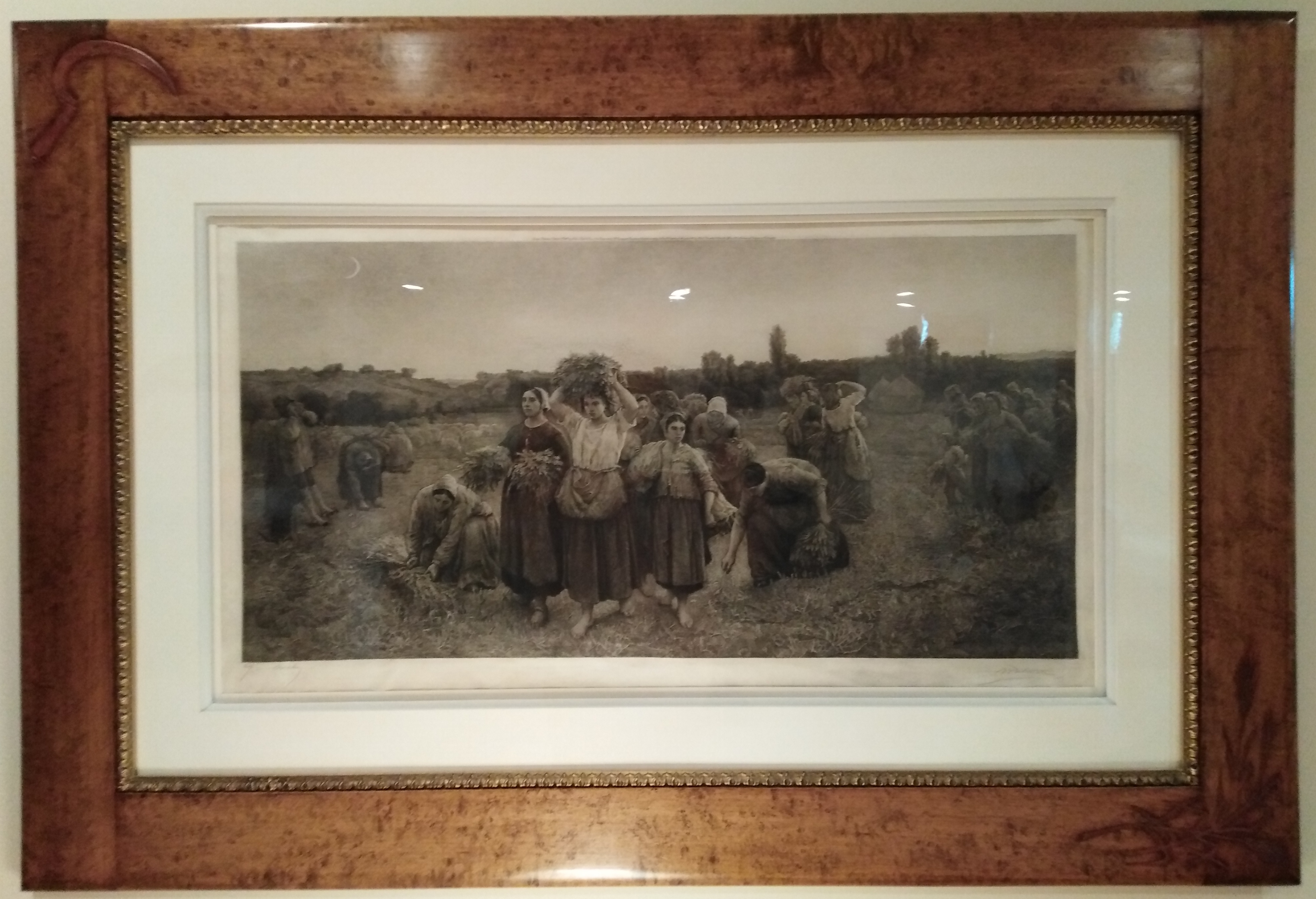
This print produced from an etching by Waltner was signed by both Waltner and original artist Jules Breton.

== Major etchings ==
This is a non-exhaustive list of the artist's etchings and the name of the original artist. Waltner signed many of the prints that were produced from his etchings. In general they tended to rather large format. One of the largest ones "La Ronde de Nuit" (aka "The Night Watch"), 1885, after the original by Rembrandt is Size: (sheet) 970 x 1085 cm; (plate) 812 x 940 cm; (chine collé) 789 x 922 cm; (image borderline) 690 x 838 cm. Owing to their relative large size, most Waltner prints that have survived till today were either protected behind glassed frames or part of a major collection. However, protection behind a glassed frame is also a mixed blessing. Acids coming from the mat and backing papers lead to the discoloration of a print even if it was originally produced using acid free paper. A full conservation of a print preserved behind glass requires the removal of all papers and treatment of the print itself by a professional.

- 1870. Portrait du baron H. de Vicq (Rubens).
- 1872. La Vierge et l'Enfant Jésus (Correggio).
- 1874. Portrait d'homme (Rembrandt).
- 1874. Femmes d'Alger (Delacroix).
- 1875. Mistress Fitzherbert (Rommey).
- 1875. Suzanne (Henner).
- 1875. Dans la rosée (Carolus-Duran).
- 1876. Jean-Honoré Fragonard (L'Etude).
- 1876. Portrait de Madame la comtesse de Barck (Régnault).
- 1876. Alfred de Musset (David d'Angers).
- 1877. L'infante Marguerite (Velázquez).
- 1878. Portrait d'homme (Jordaens).
- 1879. Vaches (Troyon).
- 1880. The Blue Boy (Gainsborough).
- 1880. Harmony (Dicksee)
- 1881. Angelus (Jean-François Millet)
- 1882. Autoportrait ( Rembrandt).
- 1882. Le Christ devant Pilate ( Munkaecsy).
- 1882. Forbidden Fruit (John Everett Millais)
- 1884. Le doreur (Rembrandt).
- 1885. An Old Man (Rembrandt).
- 1885. Lady Mulgrave (Gainsborough).
- 1885 La Ronde de nuit, The Night Watch (Rembrandt).
- 1886. La ronde de nuit (Rembrandt).
- 1886. Portrait of a man in a cap
- 1887. Recall of the Gleaners (Jules Breton)
- 1890. Portrait de Rickaert (van Dyck).
- 1891. L'Angélus (J.-F. Millet).
- 1896. Portrait de Madame Geoffrin (Roybet).
- 1898. La lutte de l'ange et de Jacob (Gustave Moreau).
- 1899. Une bretonne (Dagnan-Bouveret).
- 1901. Souvenir de l'exposition de 1900 (with Félix Bracquemond).
- 1903. L'astronome (Roybet).
- 1905. L'Arioste (Titian).
- 1905. Port de Londres (Monet).
- 1905. Portrait d'Henri Roujon (Weerts).
- 1911. Saint-Mathieu ( Rembrandt).
- 1913. Le repos de la sultane (Ziem).

== Other etchings (year unknown) ==
Costume Footman Torero (Régnault)

Girl with a Lamb (Jean-Baptiste Greuze)

Jacqueline van Caestre, wife of Jean Charles de Cordes (Rubens)

Old Man (Portrait Of Vieillard?) (Jacques Jordaens)

The Consolation Love Sadness (Ferencz Paczka)

The Pickwick Club (Charles Green)

The Rare Vase (Mariano Fortuny y Marsa)

The Widows Mite (Siegfried Detler Bendixen)

== Original watercolors ==
In addition to etchings based upon the works of other artists, Waltner also painted his own watercolors. Souvenir du voyage was a book containing 21 watercolor sketches of various subjects painted by the artist.
