= Arthur Tooth & Sons =

Defunct art gallery in London (1842–1970s)

Coordinates: 51.5084°N 0.1315°W

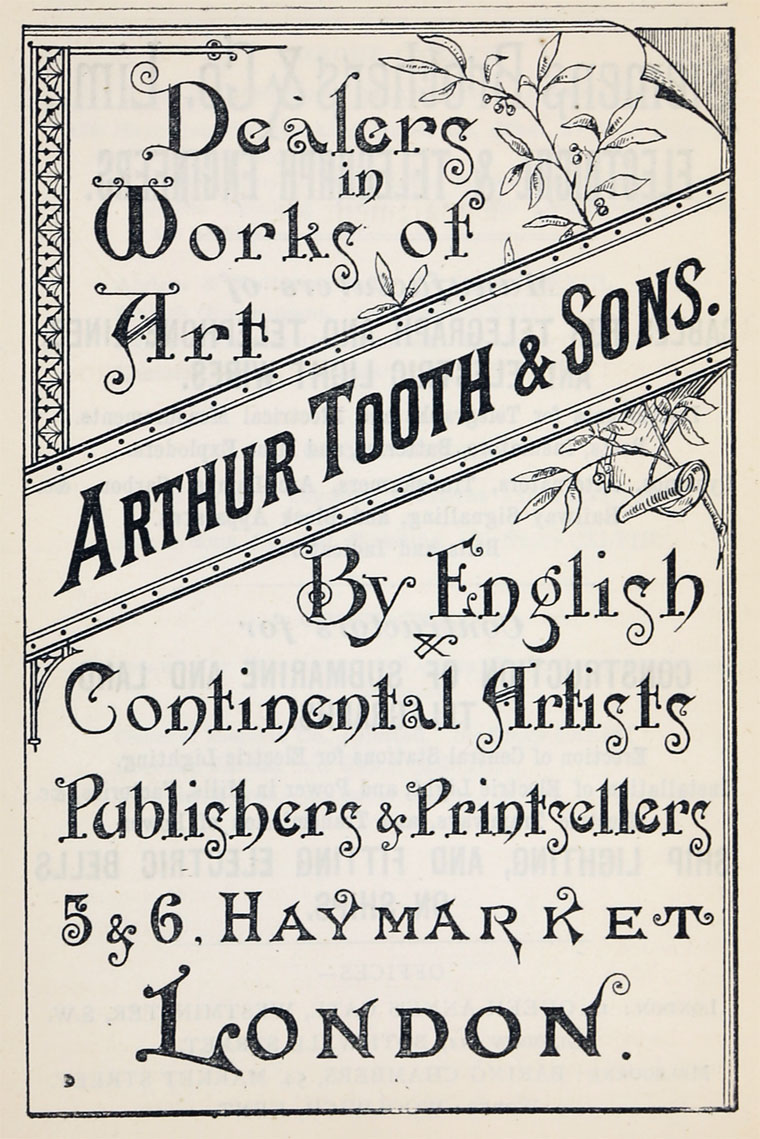
1893 advertisement for Arthur Tooth & Sons

Arthur Tooth & Sons was an art gallery founded in London, England, in 1842 by Charles Tooth (1788–1868).

== History ==
Tooth established the gallery for his son, Arthur Tooth (1828–1900). The gallery remained in the Tooth family until its closure in the 1970s after the death of Dudley Tooth (Charles' great-grandson). Arthur Tooth & Sons, while a relatively small business, established a major presence in the commercial art market from the 1870s onwards. The Tooth gallery supplied industrial magnate Henry Clay Frick with works by Lawrence Alma-Tadema, Jean-François Raffaëlli, J. M. W. Turner, Frits Thaulow, Pascal Dagnan-Bouveret, and Rembrandt.

Initially, the gallery focused on paintings by 18th and 19th century British artists, but expanded in the 1880s to include contemporary paintings and the occasional works by Old Masters. Rather than selling well-known artworks, Arthur Tooth & Sons concentrated on a steady stream of popular contemporary artists and commodity-like artworks. Operating as a kind of patron or agent for these artists, Tooth commissioned works, which were also reproduced in photogravures. The gallery's stock was selected on the notion that the "aura" of more established art would rub off on and validate newer products. Arthur Tooth & Sons operated within a network of approximately thirty art dealers in the London area who were responsible for the establishment of a number of Victorian painters within the commercial art market.

Arthur Tooth was particularly successful in the sale of photogravures of Pre-Raphaelite and other works and dominated the market in this field. Reproductive prints have been called the "cash cow" of the Victorian Art Market, and proved lucrative to Arthur Tooth.

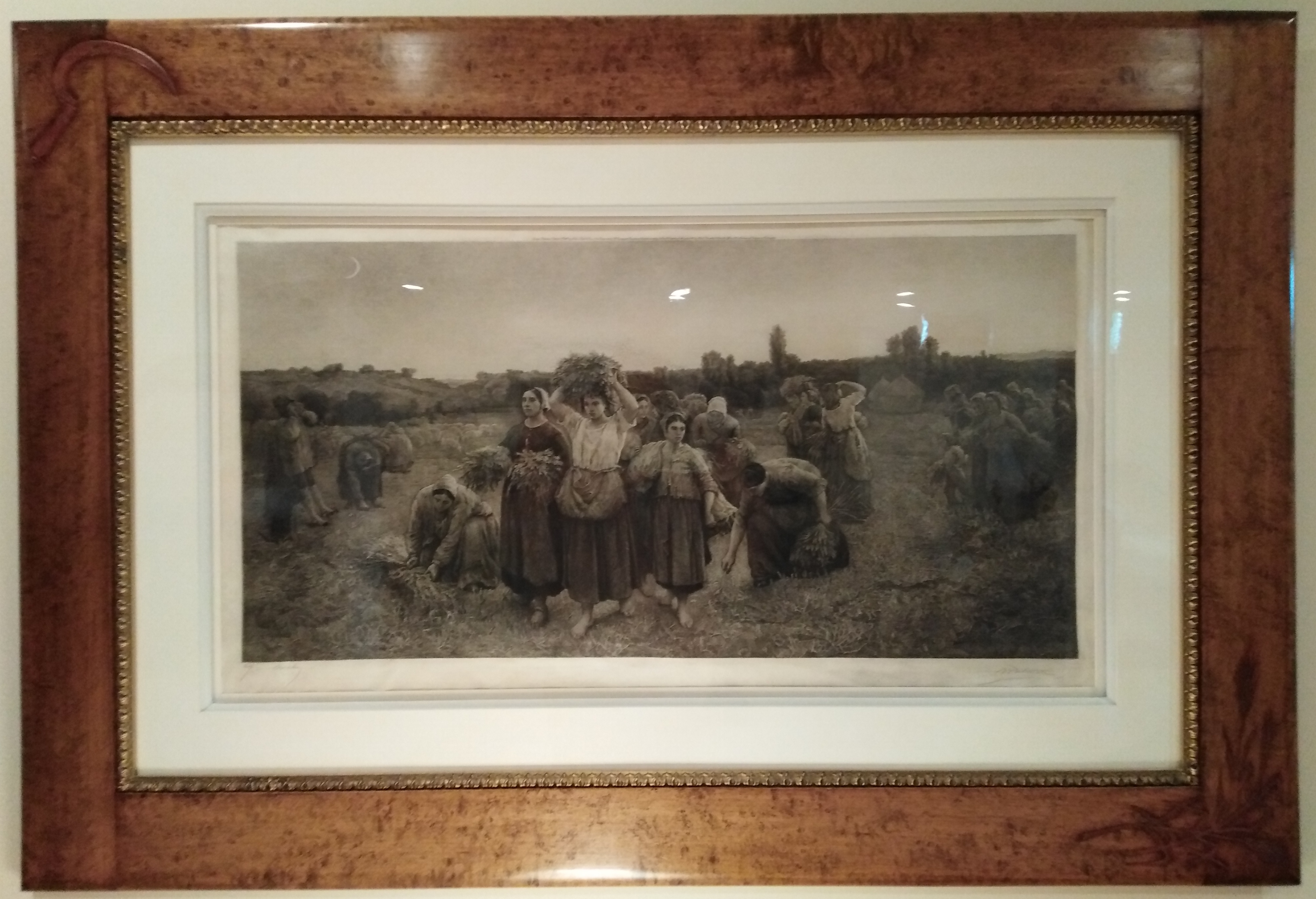
Example of framed and glassed print published by Arthur Tooth & Sons and copyrighted by Knoedler with a signature by the original artist Jules Breton and etcher Charles Albert Waltner

The 19th century saw an increased number of middlemen operating between artists and consumers in the art market. Arthur Tooth & Sons' business model can be seen as typical of these new firms. In the early 20th century, Arthur Tooth & Sons held branches in London, New York and Paris. The firm followed emerging strategies to ensure reputability, such as establishing international branches and naming galleries after individual dealers. The New York subsidiary branch closed in 1924.

In the mid 1920s, Dudley Tooth (1896–1972) took up leadership of Arthur Tooth & Sons and rebranded the gallery, expanding within the pool of contemporary artists and further promoting artists by regularly hosting a solo show of each artist's work every two and a half years.

The gallery closed in the mid 1970s.

== Bibliography ==
- Bayer, Thomas and Page, John, The Development of the Art Market in England: Money as Muse, 1730–1900, London, UK, Pickering & Chatto, 2011.
- Bayer, Thomas and Page, John, Arthur Tooth: A London Art Dealer in the Spotlight, 1870–71, in 'Nineteenth-Century Art Online: A Journal of Nineteenth Century Visual Culture', 2015.
- Helmreich, Anne, 'The Groupil Gallery at the intersection between London, Continent and Empire', in The Rise of the Modern Art Market in London, 1850–1939, Eds Pamela Fletcher, Anne Helmreich, Manchester, UK, Manchester University Press, 2011.
- MacGilp, Alexandra, 'Matthew Smith, the Tate Gallery, and the London art market', in The Rise of the Modern Art Market in London, 1850–1939, Eds Pamela Fletcher, Anne Helmreich, Manchester, UK, Manchester University Press, 2011.
- Stephenson, Andrew, 'Strategies of display and modes of consumption in London art galleries in the inter-war years', in The Rise of the Modern Art Market in London, 1850–1939, Eds Pamela Fletcher, Anne Helmreich, Manchester, UK, Manchester University Press, 2011.
- Verhoogt, Robert, Art in Reproduction: Nineteenth-Century Prints after Lawrence Alma-Tadema, Jozef Israëls and Ary Scheffer (M. Hendriks, Trans.), Amsterdam, Amsterdam University Press, 2007
- Finding Aid for the Henry Clay Frick Papers, Series I: Art Files, 1881–1925, Frick Collection/Frick Art Reference Library Archives.
- Inventory of the Arthur Tooth & Sons Stock Inventories and Accounts, 1871–1959, Online Archive of California, USA.
- Finding Aid for the Arthur Tooth & Sons stock inventories and accounts,1871-1959, Getty Research Institute.
