= Courrières =

- Commune
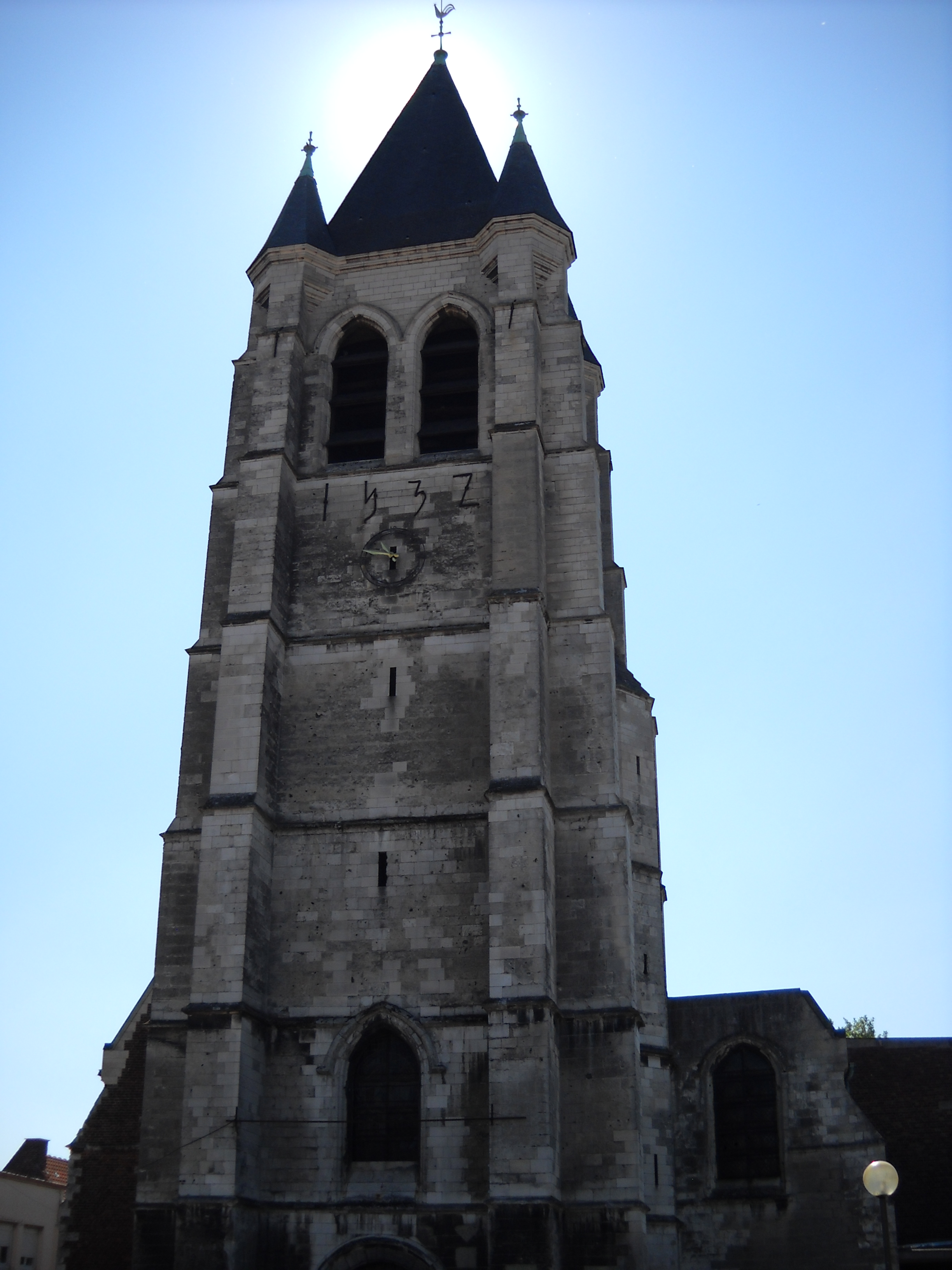
- The church of Courrières

- Coat of arms
- Location of Courrières
- Location within France Location within Hauts-de-France
- Coordinates: 50°27′31″N 2°56′53″E
- Country: France
- Region: Hauts-de-France
- Department: Pas-de-Calais
- Arrondissement: Lens
- Canton: Carvin
- Intercommunality: CA Hénin-Carvin

Government
  - Mayor (2020–2026): Christophe Pilch
- Area^{1}: 8.63 km^{2} (3.33 sq mi)
- Elevation: 25 m (82 ft)
- Highest elevation: 38 m (125 ft)
- Lowest elevation: 22 m (72 ft)
- Population (2023): 10,176
  - Density: 1,180/km^{2} (3,050/sq mi)
- Time zone: UTC+01:00 (CET)
  - Summer (DST): UTC+02:00 (CEST)
- INSEE/Postal code: 62250 /62710
- ^{1} French Land Register data, which excludes lakes, ponds, glaciers > 1 km^{2} (0.386 sq mi or 247 acres) and river estuaries.

Courrières (French pronunciation: [kuʁjɛʁ]) is a commune in the Pas-de-Calais department in the Hauts-de-France region of France about 7 miles (11 km) northeast of Lens. The Lens canal and the canalized river Deûle forms three quarters of the borders of the commune.

== Nearest communes ==
- Harnes (west)
- Estevelles (northwest)
- Carvin (north)
- Oignies (east)
- Dourges (southeast)
- Montigny-en-Gohelle

== History ==
The Courrières mine disaster which resulted in 1,099 deaths on 10 March 1906. All the regions' coalmines were closed by 1970. It was the site of a massacre in 1940.

== Population ==
Historical population
Year	Pop.	±% p.a.
1968	9,296	—
1975	12,491	+4.31%
1982	12,612	+0.14%
1990	11,376	−1.28%
1999	10,588	−0.79%
2007	10,362	−0.27%
2012	10,530	+0.32%
2017	10,512	−0.03%
2023	10,176	−0.54%
Source: INSEE

== Notable people ==
- Jules Adolphe Aimé Louis Breton, painter
- Catherine Plewinski, swimmer
- Eric Sikora, footballer

== International relations ==
Courrières is twinned with:

- Barlinek, Poland
- Aylesham, United Kingdom

== See also ==
- Communes of the Pas-de-Calais department
