= The Song of the Lark (novel) =

1915 novel by Willa Cather

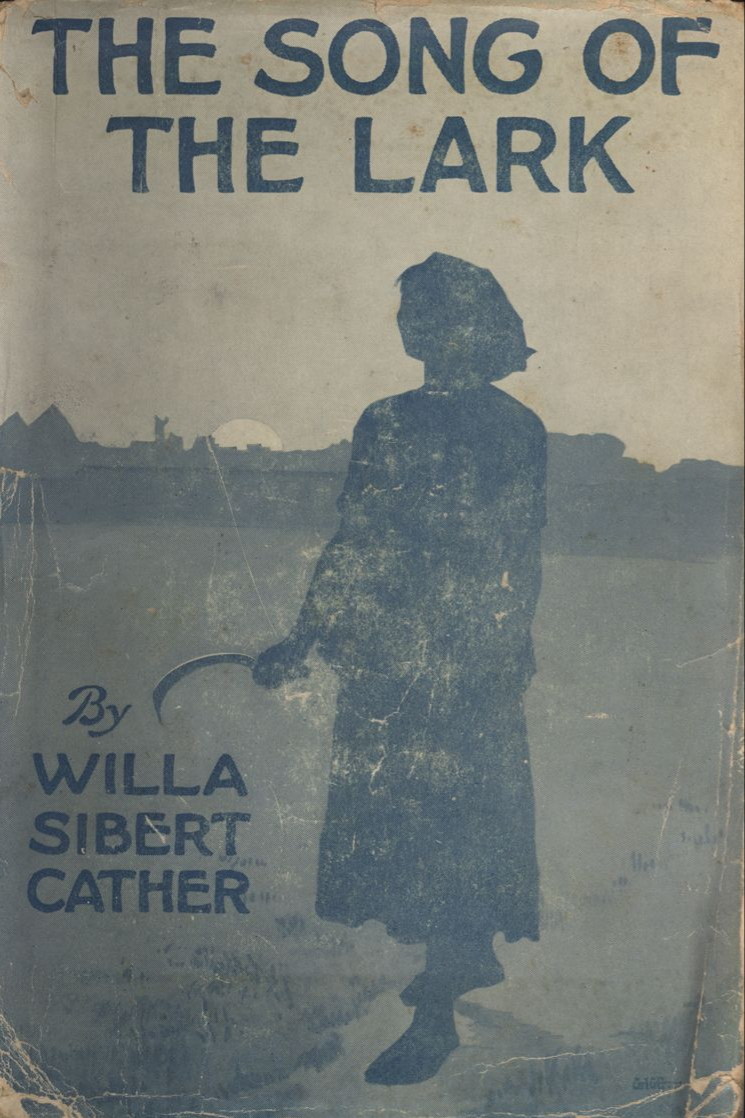
- First edition
- Author: Willa Cather
- Cover artist: see below
- Language: English
- Genre: novel, bildungsroman
- Publication date: 1915
- Publication place: United States
- Media type: Print (hardback and paperback)
- Preceded by: O Pioneers!
- Followed by: My Ántonia
- Text: The Song of the Lark at Wikisource

The Song of the Lark is a novel by American author Willa Cather, written in 1915. It is her third novel to be published.

The book tells the story of a talented artist born in a small town in Colorado who discovers and develops her singing voice. Her story is told against the backdrop of the burgeoning American West in which she was born in a town along the rail line, of fast-growing Denver near the turn of the twentieth century, and of the audience for singers of her skills in the US compared to Europe. Thea Kronborg grows up, learning herself, her strengths and her talent, until she reaches success.

The title and first edition cover art comes from an 1884 painting of the same name by Jules Breton, part of the collection of the Art Institute of Chicago.

== Synopsis ==
In Moonstone, Colorado, Doctor Archie helps Mrs. Kronborg give birth to her son, Thor, while taking care of her eleven-year-old daughter, Thea, who has pneumonia. The following year, Thea takes piano lessons with Wunsch. Ray Kennedy dreams of marrying her when she is old enough, even though Thea is twelve and he is thirty.

Thea plays piano at a concert, but the local paper praises her rival, upsetting Thea who wanted to sing instead. Wunsch tells her about a Spanish opera singer who could sing an alto part of Christoph Willibald Gluck. She sings for him. Later, Wunsch gets so drunk that he behaves badly and hurts himself. Shortly thereafter, his students discontinue their lessons and he leaves town. Only fifteen, Thea drops out of school and takes up his students full-time.

Thea and her mother enjoy a trip to Denver on Ray's freight train. That fall, Mr. Kronborg insists that Thea play the organ and lead the hymns during a church service and she does. Religion perplexes Thea, as typhoid kills her schoolmates and a local tramp – the source of the epidemic – is made to leave town; she wonders if the Bible tells people to help him instead. Dr. Archie tells her that people have to look after themselves. On the way from Moonstone to Saxony, Ray's train has an accident and the next day he bids an emotional farewell to Thea before dying. After the funeral, Dr. Archie informs Mr. Kronborg that Ray bequeathed six hundred dollars ($19,095 in 2025) to Thea study music in Chicago. Her father agrees to let her go.

In Chicago, Thea settles close to the parish of a Swedish Reformed church. She sings in its choir and funerals for a stipend, and takes piano lessons with Andor Harsanyi. When Harsanyi learns Thea sings, he is impressed by her voice. He connects her with the best local voice teacher, Madison Bowers. He then parts with Thea, explaining that her voice is a gift. During summer vacation, Thea returns to Moonstone where she attends a Mexican ball with Spanish Johnny – a local Mexican mandolin player – and sings, feeling the pleasure of the audience for the first time. Her sister reproaches her for singing there but not their father's church.

Thea returns to Chicago, moving from one home to another. She takes daily singing lessons, spending the afternoons as an accompanist for Bowers's more accomplished students. Fred Ottenburg, an educated man closer to her age, arrives for lessons. Thea catches an infection, but does not fully recover. Fred suggests that she spend the summer in Arizona where there are some of the cliff homes of the ancient peoples that Thea has longed to see.

Thea goes to Flagstaff, Arizona. She recoups and Fred later joins her. After conversing, they kiss. Thea is in love and considers marriage. Fred suggests a visit to Mexico City before getting her to Germany for her career. Fred, however, already married, though he and his wife have been long estranged. In Denver, Thea summons Dr. Archie to New York City, asking him for a loan to study singing in Germany. In Mexico City, Fred tells Thea about his marriage; Thea accepts it, but makes it clear the limits his first marriage imposes on them. In New York, she tells Fred that she will leave and will not accept his financial help. The next day, Fred leaves to tend his dying mother. Thea ponders the risks of her ambition, realizes she is young, just twenty, and heads to Germany.

Ten years later, Dr. Archie's investments succeed and his wife has died, but life is better. Four years after she left for Germany, Thea's father died and her mother quickly followed without his support. Thea wanted to go home to her mother, but an opportunity opened in the opera company in Dresden for her. Dr. Archie and Fred go to New York City where Thea is performing. In New York City, Thea performs at the Metropolitan Opera House. Fred is still tied to his wife, who has been in a sanitarium for the last seven years, but he pines to raise a son. Thea is asked to replace a singer at the last minute and performs well. She is then announced to sing the entire role of Sieglinde in the program. Harsanyi and Spanish Johnny are also present, both deeply enjoying her performance along with the entire audience.

== Allusions ==
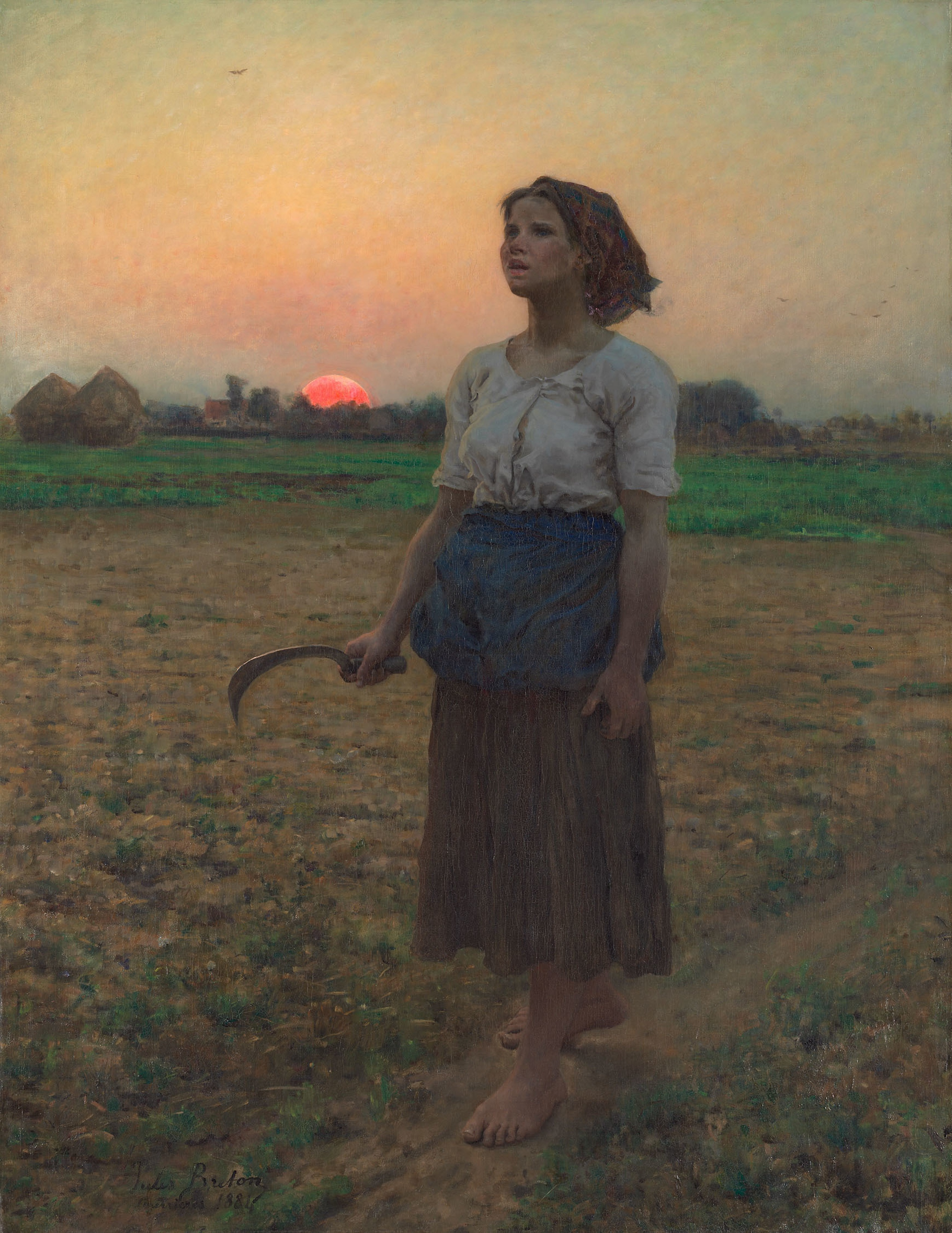
The Song of the Lark (1884) by Jules Breton, the painting that inspired the title of the book

=== Other works ===
- Literature: Nikolaus Lenau's Don Juan, Lord Byron ('My native land, good night', 'Maid of Athens', 'There was a sound of revelry', Childe Harold's Pilgrimage), Virgil-Ovid, Honoré de Balzac's A Distinguished Provincial at Paris [Un grand homme de province à Paris], Samuel Taylor Coleridge's The Rime of the Ancient Mariner, Hugh Reginald Haweis, Oliver Wendell Holmes Sr., Walter Scott's Waverley Novels, Washington Irving, Thomas Paine's The Age of Reason, Robert Burns, William Cullen Bryant's Thanatopsis, Hans Christian Andersen's "The Snow Queen," William Shakespeare's Hamlet, and Jules Verne.
- Music and the performing arts: Fay Templeton, Carl Czerny, Jenny Lind, Claudia Muzio, Clementi, Carl Reinecke, Maggie Mitchell, Johann Strauss II's The Blue Danube, Ludwig van Beethoven, Frédéric Chopin, Johann Sebastian Bach, Robert Schumann, Johann Nepomuk Hummel, Antonín Dvořák, Henriette Sontag, Clara Morris, Helena Modjeska, Charles Gounod's Ave Maria, Gaetano Donizetti's Lucia di Lammermoor sextet, John Philip Sousa, Gustav Mahler, Richard Wagner's Tannhäuser and Der Ring des Nibelungen, Ignacy Jan Paderewski; Gluck's Orfeo "Che faro, senza Euridice" (Italian); "Ach, ich habe sie verloren" (German)
- The Bible: Tower of Babel, Noah's Ark, Jephthah, Rizpah, 'David's lament for Absalom', and Mary Magdalene.
- The visual arts: Jean-Baptiste-Camille Corot, Barbizon school, Dying Gaul, Venus de Milo, Jean-Léon Gérôme, Henri Rousseau, Édouard Manet, Anders Zorn, and the painting that inspired the title of the book, The Song of the Lark by Jules Breton, part of the collection of the Art Institute of Chicago.
- Performance venues: Weber and Fields Music Hall.

=== History and real places ===
- Historical figures such as Napoleon III, George Washington, William H. Prescott, Robert G. Ingersoll, Julius Caesar, and Cato the Younger are mentioned.
- Lars Larsen's parents are said to have moved from Sweden to Kansas thanks to the Homestead Act.
- Fred Ottenberg speaks to Gustav Mahler after he conducts an opera in which Thea sings the part of one of the Rhinemaidens.
- Although Moonstone is a fictional small town at the end of a rail line in Colorado, most other cities and towns are real, like Denver, Chicago in the fast growing 1890s, Evanston, Illinois a suburb of Chicago, and Dresden in Germany. The mountainous and usually arid land in Colorado where Thea was born and places she visits with Ray are real places. In Chicago, Thea often visits the Art Institute of Chicago, which was a significant museum in the time she lived there; its first collection in 1879 was plaster casts of famous sculptures. The new building with the lions out front was built in 1893 at the time of the World's Columbian Exposition, by which time the collections of paintings had greatly expanded. The caves of the ancient peoples, the Anasazi, who predate the Pueblo tribes in northern Arizona, living in cliff-side homes in the canyons where pieces of their pots and arrowheads are found in the soil, where she stayed for a summer, are real places. The San Francisco Peaks she sees as a main landmark are sacred to the Navajo people. Thea mentions Canyon de Chelly, now Canyon de Chelly National Monument, which is located in northern Arizona.

== Literary significance and criticism ==
- The novel was inspired by the story of soprano Olive Fremstad.
- Christopher Nealon has argued that Thea is more boyish than girlish. In the Panther Canyon episode, he links her rapport with Fred to Eve Kosofsky Sedgwick's theory of homosociality.
- This novel is one of the first of the Revolt Novels, a term coined by Carl Van Doren in his article in The Nation titled "Revolt from the Village". This is a style of writing that turns the focus away from rural life as idyllic and focuses on a more real-to-life view of the rural, one that has a conservative, hegemonic and parochial bent, uses the trope of gossip as currency, and a power structure that is more complex than what was evident in the published works of earlier small-town-idyll writers. Revolt from the Village authors wrote from 1915 until the early 1930s and included Edgar Lee Masters, Spoon River Anthology (1915), Willa Cather, Song of the Lark (1915), Sherwood Anderson, Winesburg, Ohio (1919), Sinclair Lewis, Main Street (1920) and Mary Hunter Austin, A Woman of Genius (1921).

== Adaptations ==
The novel was adapted for television as part of Season 30 of Masterpiece Theatre, airing May 11, 2001.
