= The Song of the Lark (Jules Breton) =

Painting by Jules Breton

- Le Chant de l'alouette (French)
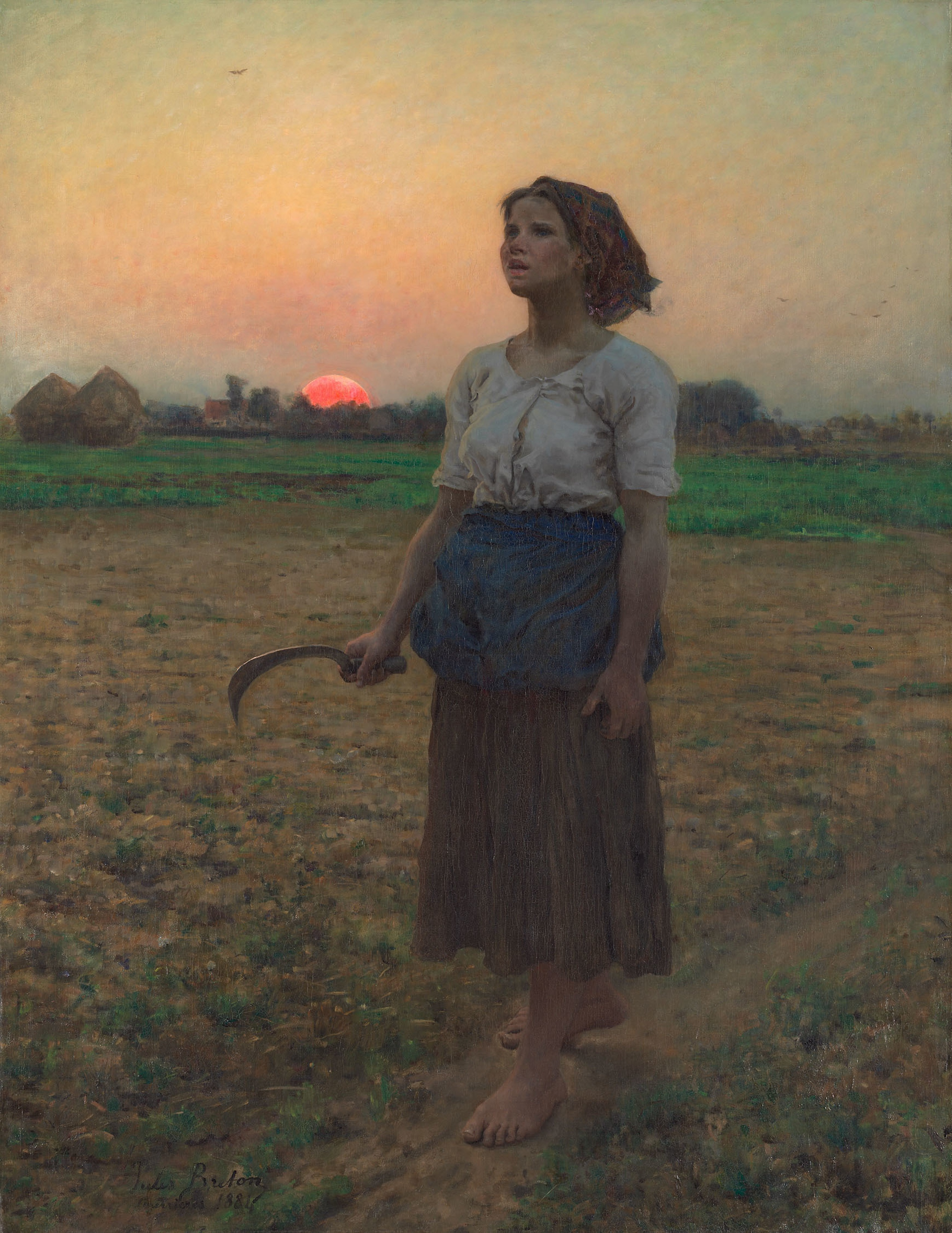
- Artist: Jules Breton
- Year: 1884
- Medium: Oil on canvas
- Subject: Farming, sun
- Dimensions: 110.6 cm × 85.8 cm (43.5 in × 33.75 in)
- Location: Art Institute of Chicago, Chicago
- Accession: 1894.1033
- Website: www.artic.edu/artworks/94841/the-song-of-the-lark

The Song of the Lark (French: Le Chant de l'alouette), Art Institute of Chicago is an oil on canvas painting by French naturalist artist Jules Breton, from 1884.

== Description and history ==
The painting shows a peasant farm girl walking in a field transfixed, listening to birdsong at dawn. It was first exhibited at the Paris Salon in 1885. Since 1894, it has been part of the Henry Field Memorial Collection at the Art Institute of Chicago, a collection of oil paintings that had been owned by Henry Field. In 1893, Field's widow, Florence, had established a trust for the purposes of loaning this collection of 44 oil paintings to the museum. On May 26, 1916, she outright gifted the entire collection to the museum.

== In popular culture ==
At the Century of Progress, the 1934 Chicago World's Fair, First Lady Eleanor Roosevelt unveiled The Song of the Lark as the winner of the Chicago Daily News contest to find the "most beloved work of art in America". She also declared it her personal favorite painting, saying "At this moment The Song of the Lark had come to represent the popular American artistic taste on a national level."

Willa Cather's 1915 novel The Song of the Lark takes its name from the painting, which is also used as the novel's cover art.

In Thomas Wolfe's 1929 novel Look Homeward, Angel, the protagonist Eugene Gant wins a prize for writing an essay on the painting.

The actor and comedian Bill Murray, during a press conference in 2014, described the inspiration he got from this painting. He remembered how after his "first experience on a stage" in Chicago he felt he had been so bad as a performer, that he walked away feeling hopeless. His walk took him into the Art Institute of Chicago, where he saw The Song of a Lark, which he said "…gave me some sort of feeling that I too am a person and get another chance everyday the sun comes up."
