= Carvin =

- Commune
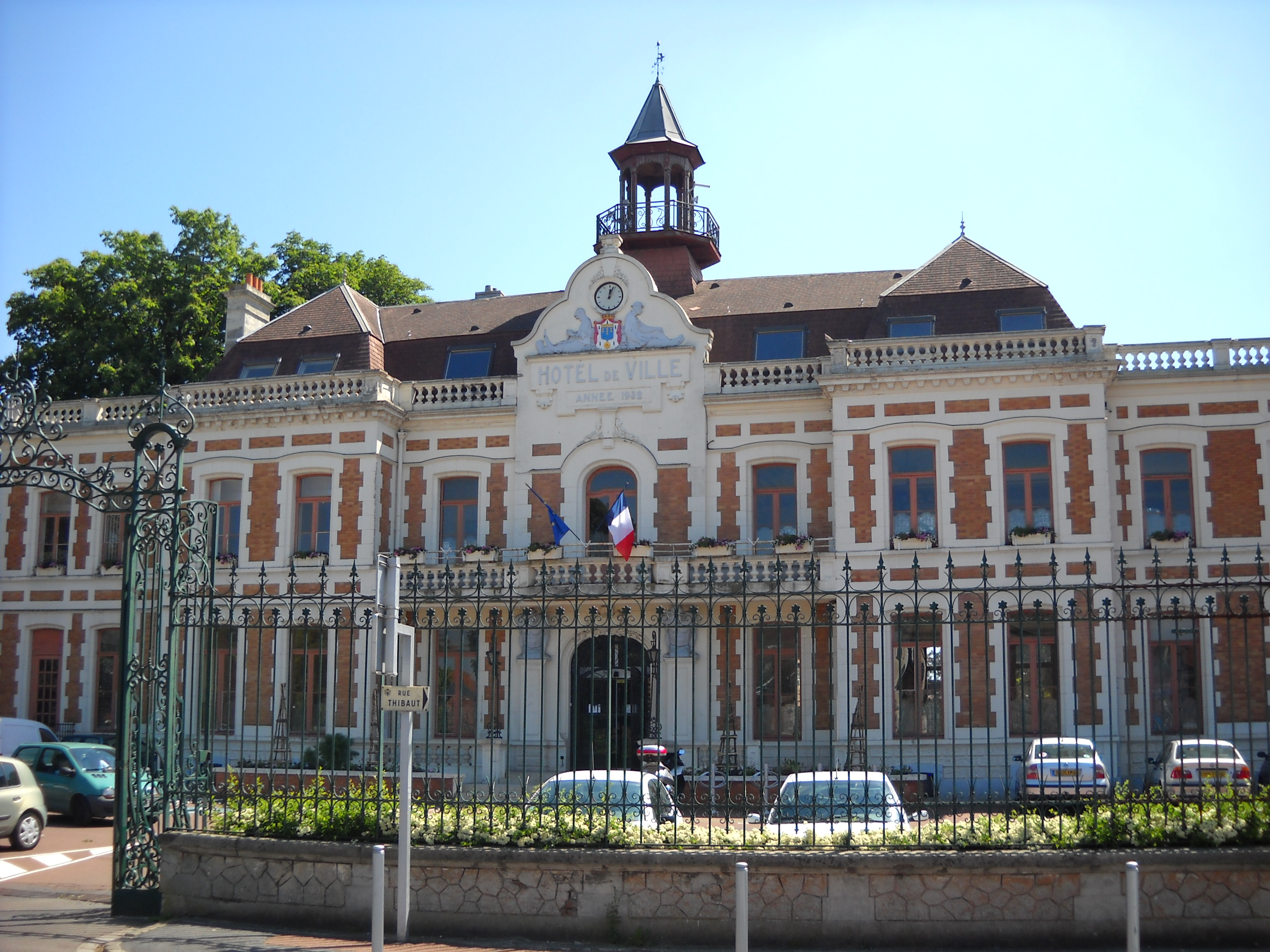
- The town hall of Carvin

- Coat of arms
- Location of Carvin
- Location within France Location within Hauts-de-France
- Coordinates: 50°29′38″N 2°57′32″E
- Country: France
- Region: Hauts-de-France
- Department: Pas-de-Calais
- Arrondissement: Lens
- Canton: Carvin
- Intercommunality: Hénin-Carvin

Government
  - Mayor (2020–2026): Philippe Kemel
- Area^{1}: 21.03 km^{2} (8.12 sq mi)
- Elevation: 28 m (92 ft)
- Highest elevation: 42 m (138 ft)
- Lowest elevation: 17 m (56 ft)
- Population (2023): 17,909
  - Density: 851.6/km^{2} (2,206/sq mi)
- Time zone: UTC+01:00 (CET)
  - Summer (DST): UTC+02:00 (CEST)
- INSEE/Postal code: 62215 /62220
- ^{1} French Land Register data, which excludes lakes, ponds, glaciers > 1 km^{2} (0.386 sq mi or 247 acres) and river estuaries.

Carvin (French pronunciation: [kaʁvɛ̃]) is a commune in the Pas-de-Calais department in the Hauts-de-France region of France about 14 miles (23 km) northeast of Lens.

== History ==
During World War I, from October 1914 to October 1918, Carvin was occupied by the Germans. Over 6,000 soldiers are buried in one of the largest German cemeteries in the Nord-Pas-de-Calais region.

Carvin was awarded the Croix de Guerre on 28 September 1920.

In May 1940, during the German invasion of France, a battle in Carvin's town centre allowed the bulk of British and French troops to escape to the Dunkirk evacuation. Once the allies had gone, the troops of the Wehrmacht arrested and murdered many miners at Arras.

In 1947, Carvin lost nearly one third of its territory with the separation of the commune of Libercourt.

== Population ==
Historical population

Year	Pop.	±% p.a.
1793	3,760	—
1800	3,670	−0.35%
1806	4,522	+3.54%
1821	4,686	+0.24%
1831	4,995	+0.64%
1836	4,953	−0.17%
1841	5,053	+0.40%
1846	5,120	+0.26%
1851	5,022	−0.39%
1856	5,426	+1.56%
1861	6,094	+2.35%
1866	6,546	+1.44%
1872	7,024	+1.18%
1876	7,471	+1.55%
1881	7,759	+0.76%
1886	7,808	+0.13%
1891	8,000	+0.49%
1896	8,614	+1.49%
1901	9,391	+1.74%

Year	Pop.	±% p.a.
1906	10,736	+2.71%
1911	11,846	+1.99%
1921	11,775	−0.06%
1926	16,664	+7.19%
1931	19,543	+3.24%
1936	18,696	−0.88%
1946	20,294	+0.82%
1954	15,780	−3.10%
1962	16,139	+0.28%
1968	17,097	+0.97%
1975	15,601	−1.30%
1982	16,206	+0.55%
1990	17,059	+0.64%
1999	17,772	+0.46%
2007	17,485	−0.20%
2012	17,198	−0.33%
2017	17,124	−0.09%
2023	17,909	+0.75%

Source: EHESS and INSEE (1968-2023)

== Twin towns ==
Carvin is twinned with:

- Kłodzko, Poland
- Carvico, Italy

== See also ==
- Communes of the Pas-de-Calais department
