= Guillaume Bieganski =

French footballer (1932–2016)

Personal information
- Date of birth: 3 November 1932
- Place of birth: Libercourt, France
- Date of death: 8 October 2016 (aged 83)
- Place of death: Lunel, France
- Position: Defender

Senior career*
Years	Team	Apps	(Gls)
1951–1959	Lille	209	(4)
1959–1963	Lens	119	(5)
1964–1966	Forbach	58	(0)
1966–1968	Marignane		

International career
1953–1961	France	9	(0)
- * Club domestic league appearances and goals

Guillaume Bieganski (3 November 1932 – 8 October 2016) was a French footballer who played as a defender.
